= Aardman filmography =

Studio filmography

Aardman Animations logo used since 2022.

Aardman Animations is an animation studio in Bristol, England that produces stop motion and computer animation features, shorts, TV series and adverts.

== Filmography ==
=== Feature films ===
==== Released films ====
#	Title	Release date	In partnership with	Distributor	Budget	Gross	Rotten Tomatoes	Metacritic
1	Chicken Run	23 June 2000	DreamWorks Animation (Note: Note: Rights to the Aardman films produced with DreamWorks Animation are now owned by Universal Pictures, following NBCUniversal's purchase of DreamWorks in 2016.)	DreamWorks Pictures (United States); Pathé (United Kingdom)	$45 million	$224.8 million	97% (169 reviews)	88 (34 reviews)
2	Wallace & Gromit: The Curse of the Were-Rabbit	7 October 2005	DreamWorks Animation	DreamWorks Pictures	$30 million	$192.6 million	95% (180 reviews)	87 (38 reviews)
3	Flushed Away	3 November 2006	DreamWorks Animation	Paramount Pictures	$149 million	$178 million	73% (136 reviews)	74 (28 reviews)
4	Arthur Christmas	11 November 2011	Sony Pictures Animation	Sony Pictures Releasing	$100 million	$147 million	93% (166 reviews)	69 (32 reviews)
5	The Pirates! In an Adventure with Scientists!	28 March 2012	Sony Pictures Animation	Sony Pictures Releasing	$55 million	$123 million	87% (150 reviews)	73 (31 reviews)
6	Shaun the Sheep Movie	6 February 2015	StudioCanal	StudioCanal (United Kingdom); Lionsgate (United States)	$25 million	$110.6 million	99% (170 reviews)	81 (30 reviews)
7	Early Man	26 January 2018	StudioCanal	StudioCanal (United Kingdom); Lionsgate (United States)	$50 million	$54.6 million	80% (173 reviews)	68 (39 reviews)
8	A Shaun the Sheep Movie: Farmageddon	18 October 2019	StudioCanal	StudioCanal (United Kingdom); Netflix (United States and Latin America)	$25 million	$47.8 million	96% (83 reviews)	79 (18 reviews)
9	Chicken Run: Dawn of the Nugget	15 December 2023	Netflix	Netflix	N/A	N/A	83% (115 reviews)	63 (30 reviews)
10	Wallace & Gromit: Vengeance Most Fowl	25 December 2024	Netflix	BBC (United Kingdom); Netflix (International)	N/A	N/A	100% (138 reviews)	83 (31 reviews)
11	Shaun the Sheep: The Beast of Mossy Bottom	18 September 2026	StudioCanal	Sky (United Kingdom); GKIDS (United States)	N/A	$25.4 million	99% (90 reviews)	80 (18 reviews)

=== Television ===
==== Shows ====
Title	Premiere date	End date	Co-production(s)	Network
Vision On (segments)	1972	1976	—N/a	BBC
Take Hart (segments)	1977	1982	—N/a	BBC
The Amazing Adventures of Morph	13 October 1980	1981	—N/a	BBC
The Great Egg Race (opening titles, series 4 to 7)	15 April 1982	28 June 1985	—N/a	BBC
Hartbeat (segments)	1984	1993	—N/a	BBC
Round the Bend (segments)	6 January 1989	1 July 1991	—N/a	ITV
The Art Box Bunch	1995	1995	—N/a	BBC
The Morph Files	4 January 1996	29 March 1996	—N/a	BBC
Rex the Runt	21 December 1998	19 April 2005	Egmont Imagination; EVA Entertainment (series 1)	BBC Two
Smart Hart	1999	2000	—N/a	BBC
Angry Kid (original run)	1999	2007	Mr Morris Productions	Channel 4 BBC Three
A Town Called Panic (English language version)	2002	2003	La Parti; Pic Pic André	Nickelodeon
Wallace & Gromit's Cracking Contraptions	15 October 2002	Christmas 2002	—N/a	BBC One
The Presentators	2003	2004	—N/a	Nickelodeon
Creature Comforts	1 October 2003	18 June 2007	—N/a	ITV
Planet Sketch	2005	2008	Decode Entertainment	CITV
Purple and Brown	2006	2007	—N/a	Nickelodeon
Pib and Pog	2006	2006	—N/a	BBC
Shaun the Sheep	5 March 2007	present	Westdeutscher Rundfunk	CBBC (series 1–5); Netflix (series 6–present)
Chop Socky Chooks	16 March 2007	4 September 2008	Decode Entertainment	Cartoon Network; Teletoon
Creature Comforts America	4 June 2007	18 June 2007	Gotham Group	CBS
Timmy Time	6 April 2009	13 July 2012	—N/a	CBeebies
Wallace & Gromit's World of Invention	3 November 2010	8 December 2010	—N/a	BBC
Canimals	9 June 2011	24 November 2015	VoozClub Co., Ltd. BRB Internacional; Screen 21	EBS; CITV
DC Nation Shorts ("DC's World Funnest" shorts)	11 November 2011	27 July 2014	—N/a	Cartoon Network
Shaun the Sheep 3D	7 March 2012	13 June 2012	—N/a	Nintendo Video
Shaun the Sheep: Championsheeps	2 July 2012	30 July 2012	—N/a	CBBC
Brand New Morph/The Epic Adventures of Morph	4 July 2014	present	—N/a	YouTube (series 1); Sky Kids (series 2–present)
Angry Kid (revival series) (Note: Revivak series animation was done by Mr. Morris Productions, while distribution was handled by Aardman Animations.)	3 July 2015	8 November 2019	Mr Morris Productions	YouTube
Golden Morph	7 August 2015	2022	—N/a	YouTube
Morph: The Lost Tapes	6 November 2015	7 January 2016	—N/a	YouTube
Meet David Attenborough	6 May 2016	8 May 2016	—N/a	BBC One
Counterfeit Cat	12 May 2016	22 January 2017	Wildseed Kids; Tricon Kids & Family; Atomic Cartoons	Disney XD; Teletoon
The Very Small Creatures	4 March 2022	present	Sky Kids	Sky Kids
Lloyd of the Flies	20 September 2022	present	—N/a	CITV; ZDF
Adventures of ArachnoFly	6 October 2023	present	—N/a	YouTube

==== Upcoming specials and shows ====
Title	Release date	Notes
Let's Go Timmy	2027	Co-production with the BBC
Pokémon Tales: The Misadventures of Sirfetch'd and Pichu	2027	Co-production with The Pokémon Company International
Pingu (reboot)	TBA	Co-production with Mattel Studios
The Almost (Untold) Story of Danger Delilah	TBA	Adaptation of Once Upon an Alphabet: Short Stories for All the Letters by Oliver Jeffers

==== Shorts ====
Title	Release date	Notes
Down and Out	13 March 1979 (Note: originally made in 1977)	Part of the Animated Conversations series.
Confessions of a Foyer Girl	13 July 1978	Part of the Animated Conversations series.
Sales Pitch	31 October 1983	Part of the Conversation Pieces series.
On Probation	1 November 1983	Part of the Conversation Pieces series.
Palmy Days	1983	Part of the Conversation Pieces series.
Early Bird	1983	Part of the Conversation Pieces series.
Late Edition	1983	Part of the Conversation Pieces series.
Babylon	4 May 1986	Part of the Sweet Disaster series.
A Grand Day Out	4 November 1989	First short in the Wallace & Gromit series.
Creature Comforts	1989	Part of the Creature Comforts and Lip Synch series.
War Story	27 September 1989	Part of the Lip Synch series.
Going Equipped	29 November 1990	Part of the Lip Synch series.
Next: The Infinite Variety Show	29 November 1990	—N/a
How Dinosaurs Became Extinct	1991	Part of the Rex the Runt series.
Dreams	1991	Part of the Rex the Runt series.
Adam	9 April 1992	—N/a
Never Say Pink Furry Die	1992	—N/a
Loves Me, Loves Me Not	1993	—N/a
Not Without My Handbag	14 November 1993	—N/a
The Wrong Trousers	26 December 1993	Second short in the Wallace & Gromit series.
Pib and Pog	7 January 1995	—N/a
A Close Shave	24 December 1995	Third short in the Wallace & Gromit series.
North by North Pole	1996	Part of the Rex the Runt series.
Pop	1996	—N/a
Wat's Pig	10 April 1996	—N/a
Owzat	1997	—N/a
Stage Fright	19 November 1997	—N/a
Al Dente	1998	—N/a
Humdrum	1998	—N/a
Minotaur and Little Nerkin	1999	—N/a
The Deadline	2001	—N/a
Len's Lens	2002	—N/a
Vacation	2002	—N/a
The Non-Voters	2004	For the BBC Election coverage.
Who Do You Think You Are?	24 December 2004	Part of the Angry Kid series.
The Adventures of Jeffrey	2005	—N/a
Stuff vs. Stuff	2007	—N/a
A Matter of Loaf and Death	25 December 2008	Fourth short in the Wallace & Gromit series.
Blind Date	2010	—N/a
The Itch of the Golden Nit	2011	—N/a
Pythagasaurus	2011	—N/a
Fly	2011	—N/a
Timmy's Christmas Surprise	12 December 2011	Part of the Timmy Time series.
Jubilee Bunt-a-thon	2 June 2012	Mini Wallace & Gromit short.
Timmy's Seaside Rescue	13 July 2012	Part of the Timmy Time series.
So You Want to Be a Pirate!	13 August 2012	Part of The Pirates! series.
Wallace & Gromit's Musical Marvels	27 August 2012	Wallace & Gromit concert.
Darkside	2013	Based on the play.
Sphere	2013	—N/a
Zombie Fairy	2014	—N/a
Ray's Big Idea	2014	—N/a
Special Delivery	2015	—N/a
Full ANL	2015	—N/a
The Farmer's Llamas	26 December 2015	First short in the Shaun the Sheep series.
Aardman Nathan Love	2015	—N/a
Mac	2016	—N/a
NSPCC	2016	—N/a
Visualise This	2017	—N/a
BeeBalls	2017	—N/a
Robin Robin	24 November 2021	—N/a
The Flight Before Christmas	2021	Second short in the Shaun the Sheep series.
I Am Your Mother	4 May 2023	Part of the Star Wars: Visions series (volume 2).
Over the Garden Wall: 10th anniversary	3 November 2024	Part of the Over the Garden Wall series.
Boop	2026	—N/a

=== Music videos ===
Song	Release date	Artists
"Sledgehammer"	1986	Peter Gabriel
"My Baby Just Cares for Me"	1987	Nina Simone
"Barefootin'"	1987	Robert Parker
"In Your Wildest Dreams"	1996	Tina Turner and Barry White
"Viva Forever"	22 June 1998	Spice Girls
"OFFF Barcelona 2016 Main Titles"	17 June 2016	P.O.S
"Daddy"	20 November 2019	Coldplay
"Love Can Heal"	2023	Peter Gabriel

=== Commercials ===
This is a selected list of commercials produced by Aardman. By 2000, the studio had produced over 100 commercials, at a rate of 15–20 spots per year. In the year 2009 alone, the studio produced 106 commercials.

Title	Year	Commissioned for
"Douglas"	1985–2003	Lurpak
"Squash vs. Capri Sun"	1985	Capri Sun
"Ready Eddie"	1986	Ready Brek
"Chewits Monster"	1986	Chewits
"Big Bad Dom"	1987	Domestos
"Wedding Cake"	1988	Hamlet
"Wooden Man"	1988–1992	Cuprinol
"Float On"	1989	Cadbury Creme Egg
Creature Comforts for the Electricity Board's "Heat Electric" campaign	1990	Electricity Board
"That Friday Feeling"	1990–1994	Cadbury's Crunchie
"Hoots Mon"	1993	Maynards Wine Gums
"Pirates"	1994	Weetabix
"Smartiepants"	1995	Smarties
Wallace & Gromit BBC 2 introductions	1995	BBC 2
"The Quaverheads"	1996	Quavers
"Snap, Crackle and Pop"	1996–2003	Kellogg's Rice Krispies
"New Neighbors"	1996	Walkers French Fries
"Dancing Reindeer"	1997	Guinness
"Wallace and Gromit"	1998–2000	Glico Pucchin Pudding (Japan)
"Pib and Pog"	1999	Dairylea
"Counting Sheep"	TBD	Serta
"Fries"	TBD	Burger King
Burger King Chicken Run movie tie-in ads	2000	Burger King
"Lisa and Darren"	2000–2005	Comfort
"Wallace and Gromit"	2000	Sumitomo
"Great Balls of Fire!"	2000	Prevacid
"Pig Power"	2002	British Telecom
"T-Birds"	2002–2005	PG Tips
"Cows"	2002–2005	Dairylea
"Wallace and Gromit"	2003	Renault Kangoo
Cracking	2003	Jacob's Cream Crackers
Fruit Camp	2004–2006	Kellogg's Fruit Twistables
Creature Comforts on the Countryside Code	2004	The Countryside Code
Wallace & Gromit: Curse of the Were-Rabbit promotion	2005	Burger King
H-H-Hot	2005	PG Tips
Ducks	2005	Hovis
Kellogg's Flushed Away	2006	Kellogg's
Flushed Away: The Video Game TV Spot	2006	
Flushed Away Happy Meal Toys	2006	McDonald's
Octopus, Jellyfish	2007–2008	Hubba Bubba
Creature Discomforts	2008–2009	Leonard Cheshire Disability
Smart	2009	Hotels.com
Wallace and Gromit	2009–2010	Npower (UK)
Christmas wouldn't be Christmas without...	2009	Marks and Spencer
Pretty Penny	2010–2011	Npower (UK)
Underdog	2010–2016	National Accident Helpline
Dot	2010	Nokia
Gulp	2011	Nokia
Arthur Christmas - Denny's Advert	2011	Denny's
DFS - Arthur Christmas	2011	DFS
DFS hand made - Arthur Christmas	2011	DFS
Toys4Tots - Arthur Christmas	2011	Toys for Tots
The Pirates! In An Adventure With Scientists - Happy Meal	2012	McDonald's
Google Hangouts with Wallace and Gromit	2012	Google+
Hints	2013	VisitEngland
Shaun the Sheep	2013	McDonald's Happy Meal
Holidays at Home are GREAT!	2015	VisitEngland
Shaun the Sheep Movie promotion	2015	McDonald's
Shaun the Sheep Movie - Moments Worth Paying For	2015	FindAnyFilm
Science Museum and Wallace and Gromit	2015	Intellectual Property Office
We Have a Plan	2015	United Nations
Sofa Experts	2016–2018	DFS
"What if...Santa Forgot"	2016	
Early Man - The Search For Comfort	2018	DFS
Meerkat Movies - A Shaun The Sheep Movie: Farmageddon	2019	Meerkat Movies
Shaun the Sheep: SUPER NATURAL WOOL	2019	The Woolmark Company
Christmas at a Click of a Button	2019	Joules
Wallace & Gromit x DFS	2019–2020	DFS
Tesco 100	2019	Tesco
Turtle Journey	2020	Greenpeace
"Things We Love"	2024	BBC
"Human Nature"	2025	Coinbase

=== Idents ===
Caption text
Channel	Years	Notes
BBC Two	1995	Christmas idents
Channel 4	1996	—N/a
BBC One	2001	Christmas idents
E4	2002	—N/a
BBC Three	2003	—N/a
E4	2005	Animated CGI idents
CBBC	2007	—N/a
E4	2007	Christmas idents
BBC One	2008	Christmas idents
Watch	2009	—N/a
BBC Two "Curve" idents	2018	—N/a
BBC One	2021	Christmas idents
Nickelodeon idents	2021	—N/a
BBC One	2024	Christmas idents

== Crew ==
Film	Directed by	Produced by	Executive Producer(s)	Screenplay by	Story by	Music by	Edited by	Production Design by	Year
Chicken Run	Peter Lord; Nick Park	Nick Park; Peter Lord; David Sproxton	Jeffrey Katzenberg; Michael Rose; Jake Eberts	Karey Kirkpatrick	Peter Lord; Nick Park	John Powell; Harry Gregson-Williams	Mark Solomon	Phil Lewis	2000
Wallace & Gromit: The Curse of the Were-Rabbit	Nick Park; Steve Box	Nick Park; Claire Jennings; Peter Lord; Carla Shelley; David Sproxton	Michael Rose; Cecil Kramer	Nick Park; Steve Box; Bob Baker; Mark Burton	Nick Park; Steve Box; Bob Baker; Mark Burton	Julian Nott	David McCormick; Gregory Perler	Phil Lewis	2005
Flushed Away	David Bowers; Sam Fell	Cecil Kramer; Peter Lord; David Sproxton	N/D	Dick Clement; Ian La Frenais; Chris Lloyd; Joe Keenan; Will Davies	Sam Fell; Peter Lord; Dick Clement; Ian La Frenais	Harry Gregson-Williams	Erika Dapkewicz (Note: Credited as Eric Dapkewicz; Dapkewicz came out as transgender and changed her name in the 2010s.); John Venzon	David A.S. James	2006
Arthur Christmas	Sarah Smith; Barry Cook (co-director)	Steve Pegram; Peter Lord; Carla Shelley	Peter Baynham; Cheryl Abood	Peter Baynham; Sarah Smith	Peter Baynham; Sarah Smith	Harry Gregson-Williams	John Carnochan; James Cooper	Evgeni Tomov	2011
The Pirates! In an Adventure with Scientists!	Peter Lord; Jeff Newitt (co-director)	Julie Lockhart; Peter Lord; David Sproxton	Carla Shelley	Gideon Defoe	Gideon Defoe	Theodore Shapiro	Justin Krish	Norman Garwood	2012
Shaun the Sheep Movie	Richard Starzak; Mark Burton	Paul Kewley; Julie Lockhart	Nick Park; Peter Lord; Olivier Courson; Ron Halpern; David Sproxton	Richard Starzak; Mark Burton	Richard Starzak; Mark Burton	Ilan Eshkeri	Sim Evan-Jones	Matt Perry; Gavin Lines	2015
Early Man	Nick Park	Peter Lord; Carla Shelley; Nick Park; David Sproxton; Richard Beek	Natascha Wharton; Ben Roberts; Danny Perkins; Didier Lupfer; Ron Halpern; Alicia Gold	Mark Burton; James Higginson	Mark Burton; Nick Park	Harry Gregson-Williams; Tom Howe	Sim Evan-Jones	Matt Perry	2018
A Shaun the Sheep Movie: Farmageddon	Richard Phelan; Will Becher	Paul Kewley	Nick Park; Carla Shelley; Ron Halpern; Didier Lupfer; Richard Starzak; Mark Burton; Peter Lord; David Sproxton	Jon Brown; Mark Burton	Richard Starzak	Tom Howe	Sim Evan-Jones	Matt Perry	2019
Chicken Run: Dawn of the Nugget	Sam Fell; Jeff Newitt (co-director)	Steve Pegram; Leyla Hobart	Peter Lord; Nick Park; Carla Shelley; Sam Fell; Paul Kewley; Karey Kirkpatrick	Karey Kirkpatrick; John O'Farrell; Rachel Tunnard	Karey Kirkpatrick; John O'Farrell	Harry Gregson-Williams	Stephen Perkins	Darren Dubicki	2023
Wallace & Gromit: Vengeance Most Fowl	Nick Park; Merlin Crossingham	Richard Beek	Sarah Cox; Peter Lord; Carla Shelley; Nick Park; Mark Burton	Mark Burton	Nick Park; Mark Burton	Lorne Balfe; Julian Nott	Dan Hembery	Matt Perry	2024
Shaun the Sheep: The Beast of Mossy Bottom	Steve Cox; Matthew Walker	Richard Beek	Peter Lord; Nick Park; Carla Shelley; Sarah Cox	Mark Burton; Giles Pilbrow	Mark Burton; Giles Pilbrow	Natalie Holt	Dan Hembery	Andy Brown; Kitty Clay	2026

== Video games ==
Release date	Title	Platform[s]	Developer	Publisher
1996	Wallace & Gromit Fun Pack	PC	—N/a	—N/a
1997	Wallace & Gromit Cracking Animator	PC	—N/a	—N/a
1998	Wallace & Gromit Print O Matic	PC	—N/a	—N/a
1999	Wallace & Gromit Fun Pack 2	PC	—N/a	—N/a
2000	Chicken Run	PlayStation, Dreamcast, Windows	Blitz Games	Eidos Interactive
2000	Chicken Run	Game Boy Color	Blitz Games	THQ
2003	Wallace & Gromit in Project Zoo	PlayStation 2, Xbox, GameCube, Windows	Frontier Developments	BAM! Entertainment
2005	Rex the Runt: Lost Marbles	Mobile	AirPlay UK	Coyote Wireless
2005	Wallace & Gromit: The Curse of the Were-Rabbit	PlayStation 2, Xbox, Mobile Phone	Frontier Developments	Konami
2005	Wallace & Gromit: The Curse of the Were-Rabbit	Mobile Phone	Frontier Developments	Konami
2005	Wallace & Gromit – The Curse of the Were Rabbit (Interactive DVD Game)	DVD	—N/a	—N/a
2006	Flushed Away	PlayStation 2, GameCube	Monkey Bar Games	D3 Publisher
2006	Flushed Away	Game Boy Advance	Altron	D3 Publisher
2006	Flushed Away	DS	Art Co., Ltd	D3 Publisher
2008	Shaun the Sheep	DS	Art Co., Ltd	D3 Publisher
2009	Wallace & Gromit's Grand Adventures Fright of the Bumblebees	Windows, Xbox 360, iOS	Telltale Games	Telltale Games
2009	Wallace & Gromit's Grand Adventures Episode 2: The Last Resort	Windows, Xbox 360, iOS	Telltale Games	Telltale Games
2009	Wallace & Gromit's Grand Adventures Episode 3: Muzzled	Windows, Xbox 360, iOS	Telltale Games	Telltale Games
2009	Wallace & Gromit's Grand Adventures Episode 4: The Bogey Man	Windows, Xbox 360, iOS	Telltale Games	Telltale Games
2009	Shaun the Sheep: Off His Head	DS	Art Co., Ltd	D3 Publisher
2009	Wallace & Gromit Adventures Java	J2ME	—N/a	—N/a
2011	Home Sheep Home	iOS, Flash	Aardman Digital (Browser), Virtual Programming (iOS port)	Aardman Animations (browser) / Virtual Programming
2011	Home Sheep Home 2	iOS, Flash	Aardman Digital (Win), Mobile Pie., Ltd (iOS port)	Aardman Animations (browser) / Chillingo
2013	Fleece Lightning	Android, iOS	Aardman Interactive	Aardman Interactive
2013	Wizards vs Aliens: The Eye of Bashtarr (2013)	Android, iOS	—N/a	—N/a
2015	Shaun the Sheep: Llama League	iOS, Android	Aardman Animations	Aardman Animations
2015	Shaun the Sheep: Shear Speed	Android, iOS	Aardman Animations	Aardman Animations
2015	Escargot Escape Artistes	Android, iOS	—N/a	—N/a
2016	Shaun's Mossy Mole Mischief			
2018	11-11: Memories Retold	Windows, PS4, Xbox One	DigixArt and Aardman Animations	Bandai Namco
2019	Shaun the Sheep: Home Sheep Home - Farmageddon Party Edition	Windows, Switch	Aardman Animations	Aardman Animations
2019	RollerCoaster Tycoon Touch – Shaun the Sheep	Ios	—N/a	—N/a
2021	Wallace & Gromit: The Big Fix Up	iOS, Android	Aardman Animations, Tiny Rebel Games, Potato, Sugar Creative	Fictioneers
2023	Wallace & Gromit in The Grand Getaway	Quest	—N/a	—N/a
2024	wallace and gromit Walkabout Mini Golf	—N/a	—N/a	—N/a
2025	Chicken Run: Eggstraction	Windows, Nintendo Switch, Xbox Series	—N/a	—N/a
2025	PowerWash Simulator	—N/a	—N/a	—N/a
N/A	Untitled Shaun the Sheep Sandbox game	—N/a	—N/a	—N/a

== Unproduced projects ==
Type	Series	Title	Description
Film	Original project	The Tortoise and the Hare	Intended to be based on Aesop's fable and directed by Richard Goleszowski, The Tortoise and the Hare was put on hold two years later because of script issues.
Film	The Twits	Crood Awakening	The film was announced in May 2005, under the working title Crood Awakening, originally a stop motion film, being made by Aardman Animations as a part of a "five film deal" with DreamWorks Animation. John Cleese and Kirk DeMicco had been working together on a feature based on Roald Dahl's story The Twits, a project that never went into production. It was later released as DreamWorks Animation's The Croods.
Film	Original project	The Cat Burglars	An animated heist action-adventure black comedy film directed by Steve Box and Darren Walsh, about six cat burglars that steal milk, and their plans to pull off 'the great milk float robbery' before some humans neuter them. The project was revived as a Netflix CGI original by June 2022.
Film	Original project	The Scarecrow and his Servant	An adaptation of a children's novel by Philip Pullman, first published in 2004. It tells the story of a scarecrow who comes alive after being struck by lightning and sets out on a quest with Jack, an orphan he hires as his servant. As he goes on his quest he tries to reach Spring Valley to claim it for his own. He has many troubles along the way such as a bird who ate his brain and being on a deserted island.
Film	Original project	The Abominables	A film adaptation of Eva Ibbotson's book The Abominables was quickly shelved and eventually canceled.
Film	The Pirates!	Sequels to The Pirates! In an Adventure with Scientists!	By August 2011, Aardman Animations had been already working on a sequel idea for The Pirates! In an Adventure with Scientists!, and by June 2012, a story had been prepared, awaiting Sony to back the project. Eventually, Sony decided not to support the project due to insufficient international earnings. According to director Peter Lord, "it got close, but not quite close enough. I was all fired up for doing more. It was such fun to do! We actually have a poster for The Pirates! In an Adventure with Cowboys!. That would have been just great".
film	Original project	Untitled Gurinder Chadha film	Aardman was reported in 2021 to be collaborating with Bend It Networks on an original film set in India that would center around an elephant named Bodhi, who dreams of becoming a Bollywood dancer.

== See also ==
- List of stop motion films
