= Peter Lord =

English animator (born 1953)

Sir Peter Lord CBE
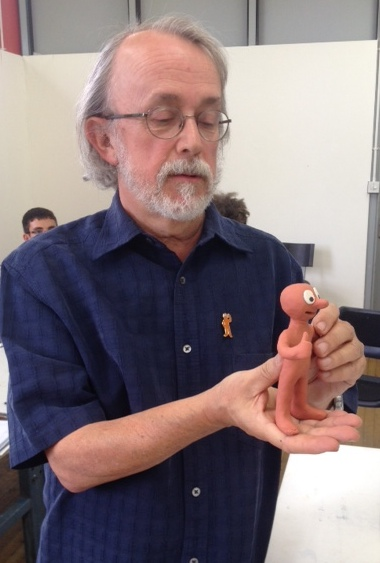
- Lord with Morph in 2014
- Born: Peter Duncan Fraser Lord; 4 November 1953 (age 73); Bristol, England
- Education: University of York
- Occupations: Animator, director, film producer
- Years active: 1972–present
- Notable work: Wallace and Gromit (1989), Chicken Run (2000), The Pirates! In an Adventure with Scientists! (2012)

Sir Peter Duncan Fraser Lord CBE (born 4 November 1953) is a British animator, director, producer and co-founder of the Academy Award and BAFTA Award-winning Aardman Animations studio, an animation firm best known for its clay-animated films and shorts, particularly those featuring plasticine team Wallace & Gromit. He also directed Chicken Run along with Nick Park from DreamWorks Animation, and The Pirates! In an Adventure with Scientists! from Columbia Pictures and Sony Pictures Animation which was nominated for Best Animated Feature at the 85th Academy Awards.

Lord is the producer/executive producer of every Aardman work, including Chicken Run, Arthur Christmas and Flushed Away.

== Life and career ==
Lord was born in Bristol, England. After a period living in Australia, he attended Woking Grammar School and in collaboration with David Sproxton, a friend of his youth from that school in the 1960s, he realized his dream of "making and taking an animated movie". He graduated in English from the University of York in 1976. He and Sproxton founded Aardman as a low-budget backyard studio, producing shorts and trailers for publicity. Their work was first shown as part of the BBC TV series Vision On. In 1977, they created Morph, a stop-motion animated character made of Plasticine, who was usually a comic foil to the TV presenter Tony Hart. With his amoral friend Chas, he appeared in a series of children's art programmes including Take Hart, Hartbeat and Smart. From 1980 to 1981, Morph appeared in his own TV series The Amazing Adventures of Morph.

Experiments with animated clay characters synchronized with 'live' recorded soundtracks led to a series of films in the style of animated documentary. The first two were part of the BBC TV series Animated Conversations and were called "Down and Out" (1977) and "Confessions of a Foyer Girl" (1978). These were followed in 1983 by Conversation Pieces, a series of five-minute-long films produced for Channel 4. They were called "On Probation", Sales Pitch, "Palmy Days", "Late Edition" and "Early Bird".

In 1985, Nick Park joined the group.

Lord, Park and Sproxton developed and finalized their style of detailed and lovingly designed clay animation characters from stop-motion techniques (though directed by Stephen R. Johnson their claymation is shown in the music video "Sledgehammer" (1986) by Peter Gabriel). In 1991, Lord animated Adam, a 6-minute clay animation that was nominated for an Academy Award. Park created the "odd-couple" Wallace & Gromit-shorts in collaboration with Lord and Sproxton. All three together worked as producers, editors and directors. Other awarded productions by Peter Lord are Chicken Run (2000), the first feature film from Aardman and the Academy Award-winning Wallace & Gromit: The Curse of the Were-Rabbit (2005).

In 2006, Lord, Sproxton and Park were all given "the Freedom of the City of Bristol". In that same year, Lord (along with Sproxton) visited the "Aardman Exhibit" at the Ghibli Museum in Mitaka, Tokyo, Japan, where he met Hayao Miyazaki. Miyazaki has long been a fan of the Aardman Animation works. In 2013, Lord was nominated for Best Animated Feature at the 85th Academy Awards for The Pirates! In an Adventure with Scientists! (2012).

Lord was appointed a Commander of the Order of the British Empire (CBE) in the 2006 Birthday Honours for services to Animation and Film.

On 9 July 2015, Lord received a Gold Blue Peter badge.

In August 2016, Lord was appointed a visiting professorship at Volda University College.

Three of Lord's films–War Story, Adam, and Wat's Pig–have been preserved by the Academy Film Archive.

In 2021, he was featured in the film Cartoon Carnival, a documentary about the origins of animation.

Lord was knighted in the 2026 Birthday Honours for services to the animation industry, the creative industries and to charity.

== Filmography ==
=== Feature films ===
| Year | Film | Director | Producer | Writer | Other | Notes |
|---|---|---|---|---|---|---|
| 2000 | Chicken Run | Yes | Yes | Yes | No | Story |
| 2005 | Wallace & Gromit: The Curse of the Were-Rabbit | No | Yes | No | No | |
| 2006 | Flushed Away | No | Yes | Yes | No | Story |
| 2011 | Arthur Christmas | No | Yes | No | No | |
| 2012 | The Pirates! Band of Misfits | Yes | Yes | No | Yes | Actor: "Additional voices" |
| 2013 | The Croods | No | No | No | Yes | Special thanks |
| 2015 | Shaun the Sheep Movie | No | Yes | No | No | Executive producer |
| 2018 | Early Man | No | Yes | No | No | |
| 2019 | A Shaun the Sheep Movie: Farmageddon | No | Yes | No | No | Executive producer |
| 2023 | Chicken Run: Dawn of the Nugget | No | Yes | No | No | Executive producer |
| 2024 | Wallace & Gromit: Vengeance Most Fowl | No | Yes | No | No | Executive producer |
| 2026 | Shaun the Sheep: The Beast of Mossy Bottom | No | Yes | No | No | Executive producer |

=== TV series ===
| Year | Title | Notes |
|---|---|---|
| 1977–1983 | Take Hart | Animator |
| 1977–1978 | Animated Conversations | Director; animator |
| 1980–1981 | The Amazing Adventures of Morph | Animator |
| 1986 | Pee-wee's Playhouse | Animation director |
| 1986 | No. 73 | Himself |
| 1995 | The Morph Files | Director; executive producer |
| 1998 | Rex the Runt | Executive producer |
| 2000 | Omnibus | Himself |
| 2000 | The Panel | Himself |
| 2002 | Wallace & Gromit's Cracking Contraptions | Executive producer |
| 2003–2006 | Creature Comforts | Executive producer |
| 2005–2007 | Planet Sketch | Executive producer |
| 2006 | Planet Earth | Thanks |
| 2006 | Purple and Brown | Executive producer |
| 2007 | The Peculiar Adventures of Hector | Executive producer |
| 2007–present | Shaun the Sheep | Executive producer |
| 2008 | Chop Socky Chooks | Executive producer |
| 2009–2012 | Timmy Time | Executive producer |
| 2010 | Wallace & Gromit's World of Invention | Executive producer |
| 2014–present | Morph | Executive producer; script writer |

=== Shorts ===
| Year | Title | Notes |
|---|---|---|
| 1983 | Sales Pitch | Director; animator |
| 1983 | On Probation | Director; producer; animator |
| 1983 | Palmy Days | Director; animator |
| 1983 | Late Edition | Director; animator |
| 1983 | Early Bird | Director; animator |
| 1986 | Sledgehammer | Animator |
| 1986 | Babylon | Director; animator |
| 1987 | My Baby Just Cares for Me | Director |
| 1989 | War Story | Director; animator |
| 1989 | A Grand Day Out | Special thanks |
| 1990 | Going Equipped | Director; animator |
| 1992 | Adam | Director; writer; executive producer; art director; animator; model maker |
| 1992 | Never Say Pink Furry Die | Executive producer |
| 1993 | Loves Me, Loves Me Not | Executive producer |
| 1993 | The Wrong Trousers | Executive producer; additional animator |
| 1993 | Not Without My Handbag | Executive producer |
| 1995 | Pib and Pog | Executive producer |
| 1995 | A Close Shave | Executive producer |
| 1996 | Wat's Pig | Director; writer; executive producer; animator |
| 1997 | Stage Fright | Executive producer |
| 1997 | Owzat | Executive producer |
| 1999 | Humdrum | Executive producer |
| 1999 | Minotaur and Little Nerkin | Thanks |
| 2001 | Chunga Chui Leopard Beware | Executive producer |
| 2001 | Ernest | Executive producer |
| 2005 | Tales for the Rest of Us | Executive producer |
| 2005 | Ramble On | Executive producer |
| 2006 | Off Beat | Executive producer |
| 2007 | The Pearce Sisters | Executive producer |
| 2008 | A Matter of Loaf and Death | Executive producer |
| 2011 | The Itch of the Golden Nit | Executive producer |
| 2011 | Pythagasaurus | Executive producer |
| 2012 | So You Want to Be a Pirate! | Executive producer |
| 2015 | Heroes of Christmas | Inspiration |
| 2015 | Special Delivery | Story; creative director; voice of "Santa" |
| 2015 | Shaun the Sheep: The Farmer's Llamas | Executive producer |

=== Video games ===
| Year | Title | Notes |
|---|---|---|
| 2025 | Chicken Run: Eggstraction | Voice of Captain Drumstick |

== Books ==
- Peter Lord & Brian Sibley: Cracking Animation (1998) Thames & Hudson; ISBN 0-500-28168-8
