= Adam (1992 film) =

- Film poster
- Directed by: Peter Lord
- Written by: Peter Lord
- Produced by: Christopher Moll
- Starring: Nick Upton
- Cinematography: David Sproxton
- Edited by: Nigel Bell
- Music by: Stuart Gordon
- Production company: Aardman Animations
- Distributed by: Aardman Animations
- Release date: 9 April 1992
- Running time: 6 minutes
- Country: United Kingdom
- Language: English

Adam is a 1992 British adult stop-motion clay animated short film without dialogue written, animated and directed by Peter Lord of Aardman Animations. It was nominated for an Academy Award for Best Animated Short and the BAFTA Film Award for Short Animation in 1992, and won two awards at the Annecy International Animated Film Festival in 1993. The film, which was distributed by Aardman, is based on the beginning of the Book of Genesis.

== Premise ==
The film is a "spoof of the creation of life". Adam is a man who is created by the Hand of God and is put on this lonely planet. He does silly acts and does all sorts of strange things. When God realises that Adam is lonely, he makes Adam a friend. Adam, expecting it to be Eve, gets himself ready as if for a date only to find out his new friend is a penguin.

== Cast ==
- Nick Upton as The Hand of God

== Availability ==
The film was released on DVD in 2000 as part of a Creature Comforts collection alongside Wat's Pig (nominated for the same category at the 1996 Academy Awards) and Not Without My Handbag. It was also available on the Aardman Classics DVD and currently the Aardman YouTube channel.

== Preservation ==
Adam was preserved by the Academy Film Archive in 2013.

== Awards and nominations ==
This is a list of awards and nominations of Adam:

| Year | Nominee / work | Award | Result |
|---|---|---|---|
| 1992 | Christopher Moll and Peter Lord | BAFTA Film Award for Short Animation | Nominated |
| 1992 | Peter Lord (director) | Chicago International Film Festival Silver Plaque for Best Short Film | Won |
| 1993 | Peter Lord | Annecy International Animated Film Festival Audience Award | Won |
| 1993 | Peter Lord | Annecy International Animated Film Festival Special Distinction for Humour | Won |
| 1993 | Peter Lord | Academy Award for Best Short Film, Animated | Nominated |
