= Pib and Pog =

Pib and Pog is the name of both a short film and a series of shorts created by Aardman Animations.

The animation is set up like a typical pre-school programme, introduced by a soft-spoken, Mary Poppins-style narrator. However, as the show goes on, it gradually turns into a black comedy where the characters attempt to harm each other constantly – for instance, shooting each other in the stomach with guns, kicking each other in the testicles, sticking each other's heads in concentrated sulphuric acid, sawing each other in half and blowing each other up with cannons. After the show has finished, the "actors" (the same characters with a more worn-out expression) break character and reveal themselves to be much older and grumpier than the characters they portray.

The characters were later used in an advertising campaign for Dairylea products on British television, and made a cameo in the eighth episode of Rex the Runt.

== Short film (1995) ==
Pib and Pog is a 6-minute animated short film made by Peter Peake for Aardman Animations which originally aired on Channel 4 in January 1995.

Pib and Pog
- Directed by: Peter Peake
- Written by: Peter Peake
- Produced by: Peter Lord (executive producer); Carla Shelley (producer); David Sproxton (executive producer)
- Cinematography: Dave Alex Riddett
- Edited by: Helen Garrard
- Music by: Mike Prudence
- Production company: Aardman Animations
- Release date: 7 January 1995
- Running time: 6 minutes
- Country: United Kingdom
- Language: English

=== Cast ===
- Joanna Wake as the Narrator
- Andrew Wilson as Pib and Pog (noise)
- Peter Peake as the Director
- Nigel Betts as Pib (talking)
- Roy Macready as Pog (talking)

== Critical reception ==
Pib and Pog received a rating of 7.3/10 from 263 users on IMDb.

=== Awards and nominations ===
This is a list of awards and nominations of Pib and Pog.

Year	Nominee / work	Award	Result
1995	Carla Shelley and Peter Peake	BAFTA Film Award for Best Short Animated Film	Nominated
1995	Peter Peake	Edinburgh International Film Festival Award for Best New British Animation Film	Won

== Series (2006) ==
In 2006, five additional shorter episodes were made in association with the BBC and were available to watch online at AtomFilms until it was absorbed into Comedy Central. Like the original short, the episodes are set up like a typical pre-school programme, introduced by a softly spoken Mary Poppins-style narrator. However, as each episode goes on, it gradually turns into a black comedy where the characters attempt to harm each other constantly – for instance, removing a rotten tooth then filling Pog's mouth shut, finding chocolate that makes Pib sick that Pog staples Pib's mouth shut but Pib vomits through his eyes, auditioning to become a contestant on The X Factor and Pog playing Simon Cowell, Pog giving Pib negative feedback with Pib blowing Pog's head off with a microphone, letting Pib lick the whisk he used to make a cake and Pib's tongue gets stuck in it. Pib then proceeding to cut Pog's face off with a knife with it landing in the cake, and finding a pornographic DVD in Daddy's study, watching some of the film with Pib throwing the disc with it piercing Pog's head. All Pib and Pog episodes can be seen on YouTube as of August 2012.

=== Cast ===
- Joanna Wake as the Narrator
- Andrew Wilson as Pib and Pog (noise)

=== Episodes ===
Dentist

Too many sweets have taken their toll on Pog so Pib turns to dentistry, removes the tooth and then fills Pog's mouth shut tight.

Peter's Room

Pib and Pog find a chocolate that makes Pib sick so Pog staples Pib's mouth shut tight, but Pib vomits through his eyes.

X Factor

Pib auditions to become a contestant on The X Factor and Pog plays Simon Cowell. Pog gives Pib negative feedback then Pib blows Pog's head off with a microphone.

The Kitchen

Pog lets Pib lick the whisk he used to make a cake with and Pib's long tongue gets stuck in it. Pib then cuts Pog's face off with a knife and it lands in the cake.

Daddy's Study

Pib and Pog find a pornographic DVD in Daddy's study. They watch some of the film, then Pib throws the disc and it pierces Pog's head.
