= Chop Socky Chooks =

Animated television series

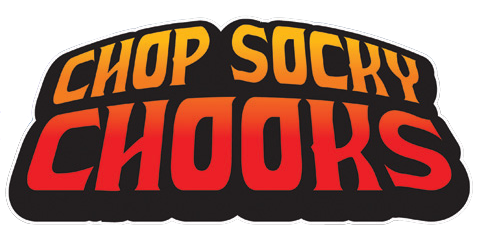
- Genre: Action comedy; Fantasy
- Created by: Sergio Delfino
- Directed by: Sergio Delfino
- Voices of: Shelley Longworth; Rob Rackstraw; Paterson Joseph
- Theme music composer: Eggplant
- Opening theme: "Chop Socky Chooks"
- Ending theme: "Chop Socky Chooks" (Instrumental)
- Composer: Lou Pomanti
- Countries of origin: United Kingdom; Canada
- Original language: English
- No. of seasons: 1
- No. of episodes: 26

Production
- Executive producers: Miles Bullough; Peter Lord; David Sproxton; Neil Court; Steven DeNure; Beth Stevenson; For Cartoon Network Europe: Daniel Lennard
- Producers: Christine Ponzevera; Janice Walker; Series Producer: Jacqueline White
- Running time: 22 minutes
- Production companies: Aardman Animations; Decode Entertainment (Note: As Decode/CSC Productions Inc.)

Original release
- Network: Cartoon Network (U.K.); Teletoon (Canada)
- Release: 16 March 2007 – 4 September 2008

Chop Socky Chooks is a British/Canadian animated action television series produced by Aardman Animations, Decode Entertainment, and Cartoon Network Europe that ran on Cartoon Network from 7 March 2008 until 24 July 2009. It was created and directed by Sergio Delfino, a prominent animator at Sony Pictures Imageworks. 26 episodes were produced.

The show previously aired on Cartoon Network throughout the United Kingdom, the United States, and much of the world, as well as Teletoon in Canada, and ABC3 in Australia. The name is from "chop socky", which is slang for the Asian martial arts film genre, and "chook", which is an Australian and New Zealand slang reference for chicken.

== Premise ==
The show is about a trio of kung fu fighting chickens who live and work in a city-sized shopping mall owned by their archenemy, Dr. Wasabi.

== Characters ==
=== The Chop Socky Chooks ===
- Chickadee "Chick P" Pao (voiced by Shelley Longworth) – Chickadee Pao is the most mature of the team and is the only female, as well as the one with the most leadership skills. In her childhood, she had a best friend named Oni (currently a villain known as Deadeye) whom she would play Blind Man's Bluff. She has personal issues with Dr. Wasabi who destroyed her home to build Wasabi World. Her daytime job is working as a repair technician in the pipes of Wasabi World, and she wears historical Chinese female attire. Her battle weapon is her razor fans. She is based on Lucy Liu.
- K.O. Joe (voiced by Paterson Joseph) – K.O. Joe is the most energetic and brash team member. His daytime job is running a comic book shop. He shows great skills with handling troubled youth and skateboarding, and fancies himself as a ladies' man. His main battle weapon is a grappling hook hair pick, and his biggest fear is insects as he remembers them crawling into his afro as a child. He is also afraid of jelly beans due to having one stuck up his nose as a baby. He eventually learns he is the estranged son of Bantam. He is based on Jim Kelly, and as such, his clothes have a 1970s aesthetic.
- Charles "Chuckie" Chan (voiced by Rob Rackstraw (U.K.), Chris Hardwick (U.S.)) – Chuckie Chan was once a student of Master Yoshi learning the fighting style "Pow Kung". He wears a stereotypical martial artist's outfit and sports a Fu Manchu moustache, and his daytime job is teaching the youth of Wasabi World his martial arts. He had an old rival named Koby/Kobura. He is known to use proverbs in almost every episode. His battle weapon is his spiritual chi energy. He is based on various Hong Kong martial artists and named after Jackie Chan and Chuck Norris. His voice changed when the series aired on Cartoon Network in the United States to avoid offending Asian audiences.

=== Main villains ===
- Dr. Fish Wasabi (voiced by Paul Kaye) – Dr. Wasabi is the ruler of Wasabi World and is the main antagonist of the show. He is a little piranha that has an astronaut-like attire with water filled inside (so as to allow him to breathe) and speaks in a German accent. He has control of every place in Wasabi World. He is armed with his top henchman Bubba and his Ninja Chimps. His name is retained from his green wasabi-like skin colour. As the title song implies, Wasabi is bad at thinking things though.
  - Bubba (voiced by Rupert Degas) – Bubba is a large ape and wears a suit along with a fedora hat. Although highly unintelligent and initially illiterate, he's big in the heart. He has the dumb and strong personality like many cartoon characters. He has proved himself very useful, besides his impressive strength. His favorite comic book hero is Captain Cockroach and enjoys reading comic books after learning to read. He is also the secondary antagonist of the show and Dr. Wasabi's henchman.
  - Ninja Chimps (voiced by Bentley Jones) – A group of chimpanzees trained in ninjitsu that serve as Dr. Wasabi's foot soldiers. They mainly serve as henchmen for Dr. Wasabi and Bubba.

=== Other villains ===
- The Omnioni (voiced by Rupert Degas) – An ancient demon who is supposed to be so powerful and evil that he had to be bottled up by the Lord of the Underworld. In Big Bad Bubba, he possesses Bubba in an attempt to open a portal to the underworld. However, Bubba's inability to read slowed him down long enough for Chick P to make Bubba sneeze Omnioni out of him and was sucked into the portal.
- Kobi / Kobura – A Japanese-accented cobra-like creature who was Chuckie Chan's rival since before the show's history. According to his master, Kobi is bad-tempered. After he was bitten by cobras, he changed into an insane, merciless megalomaniac and for this reason, was banished forever (he also has a fork in his tongue). Soon, years later, Kobi becomes a powerful snake-like being with the ability to possess great strength, control cobras, and deadly venom that will explode a person's heart by sunset. In "Kobura Strikes", the Chooks were poisoned by Kobura and his snakes and attempt to find the cure before sundown. When they were finally cured, Kobura lunges toward K.O. Joe only to fall off a tower where his final battle with Chuckie took place. He, however, appears again in "Snake in the Class", this time revealing the Chop Socky Chooks secret identities and appears to be able to hypnotize people. This attempt failed as well though. Kobura is shown to be even more intelligent and ruthless than Doctor Wasabi while his voice appears to be a parody of John Hurt's.
- Oni / Deadeye (voiced by Tracy-Ann Oberman)- She appeared in the episode "If Looks Could Kill". She is a white viper who likes wearing goth-lolita. As a child, she used to be Chick P's best friend but apparently had a left eye condition. She was extremely envious. She said "You win again Chickadee. You always win!" with vain as they played "Blind Mans Bluff". Dr. Wasabi used this to his advantage and taught her to use her evil eye (which is why she donned the name Deadeye). Once she came into town, she greeted her friend but then left to settle business with Wasabi. As Deadeye, Oni is the one who actually made Chick P's father allow Wasabi to break it down, as she specializes in hypnosis and altering reality. Chick P uses a mirror to reflect the power of her evil eye, thus destroying its reign of terror. As Chick P is about to finish her, she says "Wait! Dee, please! I can't control it, and neither can you" and then crawls up a pipe, leaving a sad Chick P and a dazed K.O. Joe and Chuckie to regret. Her eye might be a reference to the curse Evil eye.

=== Other characters ===
- Professor Shericon – Chick P's old mentor. He has a spider-like appearance and a Jimmy Stewart-like voice. He appeared in the episode "Double Trouble" where Dr. Wasabi used him to create robotic clones of the Chop Socky Chooks. His name is a play on "Shuriken" and "Silicon".
- Citizens of Wasabi World – An assortment of these appear in every episode.
  - The most commonly seen one is a large, fat lady with white skin, a green kimono, red lipstick, and black hair tied in a bun, who appears to have a huge crush on Chuckie Chan when his cover was blown, shown in the episode "Snake in the Class".
- The Cabbage Lady – A woman with a cabbage. She appeared in "If Looks Could Kill" when Deadeye disguised herself as her. Her only line was "Cabbage?" She appears again in "Snake in the Class" when she is being mugged by hoodlums. In this episode, she appears without her cabbage and says other things than what she said in the past. Voiced by Jules de Jongh.
- Siren Sung – A mermaid songstress who can't sing very well. Chuckie Chan had a huge crush on her and thought that she had the best voice in the world (in the episode Karaoke Zombies it was revealed they were both tone deaf). She almost married Dr. Wasabi (Chuckie Chan and Dr. Wasabi fought over her), only because of his wealth, later in the episode she dumps him after realizing what a selfish materialist he is, but got sucked down a drain. She fell down when Chuckie Chan accidentally let go of her while reaching for the six dollars he owed her (Chuckie Chan got her to sign something and she wrote 'To a special someone' and she said that it was $5 for the CD and $1 for the love huck). Voiced by Jules de Jongh.
- Master Genshi – A one-eyed old Chinese man who was the master of Chuckie and Kobi when they were kids. He first appears in "Kobura Strikes". He appears in person in "His Master's Choice". He also appears in "The Lamest Show on Earth". Voiced by Jimmy Hibbert
- Chuckie's Students – Recurring characters in the show. These include a germaphobe boy with green skin named Itchi (Triggerfish – voiced by Rupert Degas), a skater/gamer girl with yellow skin named Umé (Hen – voiced by Josephine Wyatt), a boy with dark skin and always appears with a basketball named Stroose (Slaying Mantis – voiced by Harvey Davidson), a kimono girl named Cho (Lady Bug – voiced by Jules de Jongh), and a boy with blue skin named Raco (Dung Beetle – voiced by Rob Rackstraw). Raco, Stroose, and Cho briefly became Junior Chooks in "Snake in the Class". In "Game Over Chooks!" it is revealed that Ume and Itchi are related.
- Iron Butt Monks – A trio of Chinese monks with fat iron butts (as their name suggests). In "Return the Other Cheek", Wasabi enlists Bubba to steal the Twin Cheeks, but was only able to steal one, and Bubba leaves behind one of Joe's 'fro combs as proof that the Chooks were responsible for stealing the Twin Cheeks. Their iron butts, as Chuckie explained in two of three episodes in which they appeared, came from their training; they threw their butts onto buckets of sand, hot coals, and finally, molten lava. This gave them their steel derrières, which are extremely hard, and they honed their powers, learning their most powerful attack, the Fiery Butt-Blast of Fury. One is voiced by Alan Marriott.
- Hairy Sumo Brothers – A duo of sumos named Larry and Harry with hair all over their bodies (as their name suggests). In "The Codfather", Wasabi fires Bubba for the Hairy Sumo Brothers and aids Wasabi in stealing money for himself. Larry was voiced by Glenn Wrage.
- Mother Superior – A one-eyed Squid dressed up as a nun who is the mother of the Iron Butt Monks.
- The Bantam – He is Wasabi's nemesis. He is implied to be K.O. Joe's father and has a striking resemblance to Batman (his name is even an anagram).
- Squirt – He is a little teddy bear type thing who helps the Chop Socky Chooks get out of the jungle in "Isle Being Seeing You". K.O. calls him Cuddley sidekick. He is pink with brown stripes.
- House Seller – He is a fish type thing who appears in "The Codfather" that sells houses to the enemy. Voiced by Jared Stamm.
- Dark Rye – A bone-crossed skull with eyeballs (he has one blue eye and one grey eye) dressed as a pigtail, who is The Cabbage Lady's best friend. Voiced by Tom Clarke-Hill.

== Episodes ==
No.	Title	Written by	Storyboarded by	US air date	Canadian air date	Prod. code	UK air date
1	"Game Over Chooks!"	Ian Carney	Richard Bazley; Wayne Thomas (additional)	7 March 2008	2007-03-16	102	8 September 2008
Dr. Wasabi uses the Chooks to be the power source of a new video game. This video game will actually kill the Chooks in real life.
2	"Big Bad Bubba"	Lienne Sawatsky and Dan Williams	Mike Reagan	14 March 2008	2007-07-13	104	15 September 2008
Bubba accidentally releases an evil demon named Omnioni that possesses his body. When the Chooks realize this, they try to stop the demon from releasing his kin into Wasabi World.
3	"Kobura Strikes"	Richard Elliott and Simon Racioppa	Danny Cappozzi; Mike Fasolo (additional)	21 March 2008	2007-07-15	106	22 September 2008
A rival of Chuckie Chan named Kobura comes to Wasabi World so that he can take him and the Chooks down.
4	"Now You Coliseum, Now You Don't"	J.D. Smith	Richard Bazley; Steve Beaumont (additional)	28 March 2008	2007-07-20	101	29 September 2008
K.O. Joe protests Dr. Wasabi's decision to ban solar boarding in Wasabi World. Because of this, the Ninja Chimps and the Chooks must face off in a rollerblading competition at Dr. Wasabi's arena.
5	"Double Trouble"	Mike Kubat	Steve Beaumont	4 April 2008	2007-07-22	107	5 October 2008
Chick P visits her old mentor when robotic Chooks attack Wasabi World. Once there, she tries to find out where the Mecha-Chooks came from. All signs point to the fact that her old teacher is working for Dr. Wasabi.
6	"If Looks Could Kill"	Dale Schott	Steve Beaumont	17 April 2008	2007-07-27	109	12 October 2008
Chick P holds a reunion with her old friend Oni, but unknown to her, Oni has another agenda; as the malicious Deadeye, she has a new scheme to enact revenge on Chick P and also take over Wasabi World and the Chooks investigate. During the investigation, they discover why Chick P's family has lost its honor.
7	"Do You Want Thighs with That?"	Lienne Sawatsky and Dan Williams	Blair Simmons	24 April 2008	2007-07-29	105	19 October 2008
Citizens of Wasabi World are getting fatter with every Wasabi Burger they eat. Luckily, Dr. Wasabi has set up liposuction centers all around Wasabi World. It's up to the Chooks to discover what exactly is inside the burgers, but things go awry when Dr. Wasabi's brain accidentally ends up in the fat and brings it to life.
8	"In Your Dreams"	Richard Elliott and Simon Racioppa	Danny Cappozzi; Mike Reagan and Mark Warner (additional)	1 May 2008	2007-08-03	103	26 October 2008
Chuckie Chan is captured as a prisoner in Wasabi's Dream World because he has insomnia. To save Chuckie Chan, Chick P comes up with a plan to rescue him by sending K.O. Joe into the dream world. While there, both of the guys have to face their nightmares; Chuckie's being a giant toy duck, Mr. Quackers, and Joe's being a fear of jellybeans.
9	"Speak Now or Forever Hold Your Breath"	Mark Robertson; Lienne Sawatsky and Dan Williams (story)	Richard Bazley	8 May 2008	2007-08-05	108	2 November 2008
Wasabi makes plans to marry the tone-deaf mermaid Siren Sung (who Chuckie Chan has a crush on), and soon decides to flood Wasabi World (and rename it Wasabi Water World). Now it's up to the Chooks to stop wedding arrangements or risk swimming with the fishes, or in Chuckie's case, lose Siren Sung.
10	"Snake in the Class"	Dale Schott	Christian De Vita; Bob Richards (additional)	15 May 2008	2008-05-17	111	9 November 2008
When the Chooks secret identities are revealed, they must go into hiding. Chuckie Chan's pupil's then become the Junior Chooks to act as the Chooks go-betweens, but Chuckie suspects there may be a traitor among them. It turns out Kobura is back and has teamed up with Dr. Wasabi.
11	"His Master's Choice"	Dale Schott	Mike Reagan	22 May 2008	2008-05-24	113	16 November 2008
Chuckie Chan's master named Master genshi senses trouble in the Cosmic Balance, and traces it back to its source – Dr. Wasabi's new toy, the Karma Gotcha. The Karma Gotcha steals its owners' good luck/karma. But Chuckie Chan is ordered to return to his monastery (his master was displeased with his progress), leaving only K.O. Joe and Chick P to stop Dr. Wasabi's evil plot.
12	"Chop Socky Whoops"	J.D. Smith	Andreas von Andrian; Bob Richards (additional)	29 May 2008	2008-05-31	110	23 November 2008
Dr. Wasabi decides to go back in time to the day the Chooks formed and prevent them from ever meeting each other.
13	"The Mark of the Bantam"	Simon Racioppa and Richard Elliot	Christian De Vita; Andreas von Andrian and Bob Richards (additionals)	3 November 2008	2008-06-07	117	30 November 2008
After Wasabi makes a foolish television show of his enemy Bantam, the Chooks have to save the day when the real one shows up.
14	"Karaoke Zombies"	J.D. Smith	Benedict Lewis; Trevor Ricketts, Bob Richards, and Steve; Beaumont (additionals)	4 November 2008	2008-06-14	118	7 December 2008
While visiting the Karaoke Korral, the Chooks discover that Wasabi plans on changing the mall-dwellers of the peaceful level into living zombies.
15	"Return the Other Cheek"	Richard Eliott and Simon Racioppa	Catherine Lieuwen	5 November 2008	2008-06-21	116	14 December 2008
When Wasabi finds out that the Iron Butt Monk's power comes from the Twin Orbs of the Apocalypse, he sends Bubba in to steal it. However, Bubba is only able to steal one, meaning the Cosmic wind will attack Wasabi World. It's up to the Chooks and the Iron Butt Monks to bring the two Cheeks back together before it's too late.
16	"Planet of the Bubba"	Dale Schott	Aaron Preacher	12 November 2008	2008-06-28	121	21 December 2008
Bubba fixes Wasabi's TV satellite and is accidentally struck by some sort of powerful force. This force causes Bubba to become super smart and he uses his smarts to put the Wasabi World citizens in a zoo. It's up to the Chooks to find a way to stop Bubba's new evil plans. Title reference: Planet of the Apes
17	"The Level That Time Forgot"	Dale Schott	Benedict Lewis and Andy Janes; Bob Richards (additional)	7 November 2008	2008-07-05	112	28 December 2008
The Chooks are trapped in a prehistoric mall level when Wasabi attacks the group. Things take a turn for the worse, when they are attacked by a mutant budgie, and the level's inhabitants find Chick P to be the Queen of the Neandermalls.
18	"Bushido Babies"	Ian Carney	Adam Beer; Benedict Lewis and Bob Richards (additionals)	11 November 2008	2008-07-12	114	4 January 2009
The Chooks are up against their toughest opponents yet – a group of babies. These babies aren't exactly typical, however. That's because they've been drinking Wasabi's breast milk in a plan to make an army of Bushido Babies.
19	"Appalling 13"	Dale Schott	Christian De Vita; Andreas von Andrian and Bob Richards (additionals)	13 November 2008	2008-08-16	122	11 January 2009
Dr. Wasabi offers the mall-dwellers free trips to the moon, but the Chooks discover that it's part of his evil scheme to make them work as slaves in his space mine. Title reference: Apollo 13
20	"Chooks of Hazard"	Jeff Biederman	Benedict Lewis; Bob Richards (additional)	14 November 2008	2008-08-20	125	18 January 2009
The Chooks compete in a wacky race against Wasabi World's most dangerous villains to prevent Dr. Wasabi from obtaining the components for a deadly Doomsday device. Title reference: Dukes of Hazzard
21	"Enter the Chickens"	Ian Carney	Christian De Vita; Andreas von Andrian and Bob Richards (additionals)	17 November 2008	2008-08-21	120	25 January 2009
To prove to his students that the pure path of Kung Fu is best, Chuckie Chan convinces the Chooks to participate in Dr. Wasabi's Ultimate Martial Artist contest. However, Dr. Wasabi knows that they'll make it to the final round, so he rigs the contest to stack the odds against them.
22	"Swarm Welcome"	Sean Jara	Andreas von Andrian; Bob Richards (additional)	18 November 2008	2008-09-07	123	1 February 2009
Dr. Wasabi tries to obtain the powers of a radioactive bug, but things go awry and Wasabi World is overrun by cockroaches.
23	"The Lamest Show on Earth"	Doug Hadders and Adam Rotstein	Mike Reagan	19 November 2008	2008-09-14	119	8 February 2009
Chuckie Chan is entrusted with guarding a rare and valuable dragon egg. When the egg hatches, the Chooks must take care of the baby dragon and keep it from falling into the hands of Dr. Wasabi.
24	"Isle Be Seeing You"	Mark Robertson	Adam Beer; Bob Richards and Benedict Lewis (additionals)	20 November 2008	2008-09-21	126	15 February 2009
The Chooks wake up on a mysterious island filled with dangerous perils as part of Dr. Wasabi's new, deadly, reality TV show.
25	"The Codfather"	Simon Racioppa and Richard Elliott	Andreas von Andrian; Bob Richards (additional)	6 November 2008	2008-09-28	115	22 February 2009
Chick P wants Bubba to be the fourth member of the Chop Socky Chooks after Wasabi fires him for the Hairy Sumo Brothers. However, Bubba only seems to get in the way when it comes to fighting in battles. Title Reference: The Godfather
26	"Down the Drain"	Ian Carney	Andreas von Andrian; Bob Richards (additional)	21 November 2008	2008-10-05	124	1 March 2009
A simple misunderstanding makes Wasabi's main computer flush him down the toilet. Things get worse when Bubba attacks it, making it go haywire and making the various electronic equipment in the mall attack the customers. The Chooks must fight the mall itself, as Dr. Wasabi is being stalked by a monster in the sewers.

== Cast ==
- Rob Rackstraw as Chuckie Chan (U.K.)
- Chris Hardwick as Chuckie Chan (U.S.)
- Paterson Joseph as K.O. Joe
- Paul Kaye as Dr. Wasabi
- Shelley Longworth as Chick P.
- Rupert Degas as Bubba
- Glenn Wrage as Larry Sumo
- Alan Marriott as Iron Butt Monk
- Jules de Jongh as Siren Sung / Cabbage Lady / Cho
- Jared Stamm as House Seller
- Marc Silk
- Jimmy Hibbert
- David Menkin
- Justin Fletcher
- Tom Clarke-Hill
- Tracy-Ann Oberman as Oni/Deadeye
- Kulvinder Ghir
- Danny John-Jules
- Keir Stewart
- Sandra Oh

== Crew ==
- Richard Hansom – Voice Director

== Production ==
Development of the series was announced on 19 September 2003 during the Cartoon Fourm in that year, when Bristol-based stop-motion animation studio Aardman Animations announced that it would produce its first CGI animated production (predating its first CGI film, Flushed Away (as using real life water would have damage stop-motion models), with a 2006 delivery window. Aardman's co-founders Peter Lord and David Sproxton served as executive producers for the upcoming series with Cartoon Network Europe as commissioner, obtaining global pay-TV rights including the UK. One year later on 1 November 2004, the series became a British/Canadian co-production when Toronto-based Canadian production studio Decode Entertainment announced they had joined the series as a co-producer with Decode's distribution arm Decode Enterprises handling worldwide distribution except the UK, which Aardman retained.

== Home media ==
On 6 October 2009, 20th Century Fox Home Entertainment released a DVD in the United States containing the first thirteen episodes of the series. Each episode is presented with English 5.1 Dolby Surround and English, French and Spanish subtitles.

On 28 June 2010, a DVD release containing all twenty-six episodes of the series was released in the United Kingdom by 2 Entertain.

== Reception ==
Common Sense Media gave the show 2 out of 5 stars, complaining the show was too violent for children.
