= Wat's Pig =

- Directed by: Peter Lord
- Written by: Peter Lord
- Produced by: Michael Rose; Jo Allen
- Cinematography: Andy MacCormack
- Edited by: Tamsin Parry
- Music by: Andy Price
- Production companies: Aardman Animations; Channel Four Films
- Distributed by: AtomFilms; Northern Arts Entertainment
- Release dates: 10 April 1996 (New York City); 1 June 1996 (UK)
- Running time: 11 minutes
- Country: United Kingdom
- Language: English

Wat’s Pig is a 1996 British stop-motion animated short film created by Aardman Animations and written and directed by Peter Lord. It is a tale of two brothers who are separated as babies only to reunite as adults during a war. It is told almost entirely non-verbally. It is based loosely on the story of The Prince and the Pauper.

== Plot ==
In a medieval castle, a marauder tries to kidnap twin infant sons. Startled by the mother, he makes off with only one, Wat, whom he accidentally drops in the wilderness and is forced to leave behind. A friendly pig comes across Wat.

Many years later, the two brothers live as neighbours, unaware of each other's identities. In the castle, the brother lives as a powerful and wealthy Earl, while Wat, who has been raised since childhood by the pig, scrapes a living in his humble hovel. When a nearby Baron threatens the Earl with war, the brother in the castle is too soft to fight. Wat is the sole survivor of a battle and finds the Earl has kidnapped his pig.

The twins are united just as the Baron approaches the castle; their overjoyed mother recognises Wat and embraces him. The cowardly brother has Wat take his place in battle. Wat is cheered on by a crowd who booed the Earl, who flees to the hovel. Later, he awakens to find Wat and his mother and the pig resting and the castle destroyed, as Wat tries to teach him the life of a peasant.

== Production ==
According to the crew, Wat's Pig was "shown first to all the Aardman people in a studio premiere without benefit of spotlights and starlets. Since then it's been shown at many short film festivals, and was then included in the Aardman Collection (which has been touring the world's cinemas very successfully)". They described it as a "long slow haul making Wat's Pig. The idea started...on holiday in the Dordogne region of France. On one stretch of the river, two enormous fortresses face each other only a few miles apart. One was occupied by the French during the Hundred Years War, and one by the English. Having enjoyed the beauty and the spectacle of these old castles, and admired the romantic histories of the knights who lived in them, I couldn't help thinking about the poor devils who lived somewhere in between. I imagined them doggedly getting on with their lives, doing their best, resigned to constantly having their farms looted and their crops trampled by passing armies. ...these sombre reflections on the lifestyles of the mediaeval poor set me thinking about a film based on such a character. I wrote a number of outlines for a 30 minute film but couldn't get the story to work. Then one evening at Aardman we were chatting about story ideas (we call it a Creative Pizza) when Steve Box mentioned the idea of split screen. He was talking about a different film entirely, but the idea stuck in my head. Split-screen storytelling - the idea of two parallel stories - seemed perfect for my mediaeval story. The whole point of Wat's Pig is that the Earl in his castle is utterly unaware of the existence of the peasant Wat, but continuously affects his life in the most profound way. What beter than to have both of them in vision together? I loved the idea of telling two interlocking stories simultaneously; it seemed like great fun and turned out to be a real intellectual exercise; it was incredibly difficult to choreograph the action on both sides of the screen. At a certain stage I admitted to myself that telling the whole story that way would simply be too contrived, so in the end I decided to drop in and out of the split-screen world as the story seemed to demand.

Wat's Pig was Aardman's sixth Academy Award nomination, and Lord's second Academy Award nomination as a director.

Peter Lord said: "I don't expect, Wat's Pig to make its money back, or Stage Fright to make its money back, but we have that luxury. We can do that here, because we get money from the commercials and the merchandising malarkey."

He explained some of the production process:

As a concept, it was in there right from the start. I think it is interesting as a way with story telling, not just as a technical exercise. I think about Paul Driessen's film, The End of the World in Four Seasons, a similar storytelling approach. There was a time when I thought of doing more of the film in split-screen, not the whole film, but more with split-screen, but that [idea] slowly eroded as I worked on the storyboards. I felt it would become too "tricksy." It was, in a way, an intellectual challenge, but technically, we went about it in the most quaint, old-fashioned way imaginable, with film opticals at the end. Exactly why we didn't composite it electronically, I'm not quite sure. I wish we had, it would have been a lot easier!. It's funny, the way we work, it's like we were in a time warp, really. It's like making a film 20 years ago or something. We didn't assemble two halves of the image until the end, so I didn't really know how things would work out accurately until the end.

== Critical reception ==
Peter Stack praised the film as having "an astonishing amount of humor and pathos into its 11 minutes as it re- creates a Dark Ages setting of fan tasy and grim reality. It's a stunning little film". DVD Review describes Wat's Pig as "Scripted, widescreen, more ordinary, and better (than War Story)". Dr. Grob gave the film two stars out of five, praising the "silent comedy, with very little dialogue (only ‘me?’ and ‘hello?’ are uttered)" and "split screen". He called the "animation and sets are both of a high quality. His review is not without criticism, feeling that "Lord’s story is as rambling as it is boring, and completely fails to fulfil its promise". He calls the ending "rather sudden and inconclusive, leaving us with Andy Price’s attractive quasi-medieval music. In fact, I’m surprised the film even got an Academy Award nomination."

=== Awards and nominations ===
Year	Nominee / work	Award	Result
1997	Peter Lord	Academy Award for Best Short Film, Animated	Nominated

== Preservation ==
Wat's Pig was preserved by the Academy Film Archive in 2013.
