= Down and out =

Down and out may refer to:

== Music ==
- "Down and Out" (George Strait song), 1981
- "Down and Out" (Cam'ron song), 2004
- "Down and Out" (Tantric song)
- "Down and Out," a song from the 1997 album Symbols by KMFDM
- "Down and Out" a song from the 2005 album Almost Here by The Academy Is...
- "Down and Out," a song from the 1978 album ...And Then There Were Three... by Genesis
- "Down and Out," a song from the B-side of the 1973 "Photograph" single by Ringo Starr
- Down 'n' Outz, a cover band fronted by Def Leppard's Joe Elliott

== Other uses ==
- Down and Out (film), a 1977 short film created by Aardman Animations
- "Down and Out" (Gimme Gimme Gimme), a 2001 television episode
- Down and out (football), a passing play in American football where the quarterback passes to a pre-arranged wide receiver
- In finance, a kind of barrier option
- Down and out gaze, the direction of the eye ipsilaterally to an oculomotor nerve palsy
