= On Probation =

On Probation can refer to:

- On Probation (1924 film), an American silent film
- On Probation (1935 film), an American drama film
- On Probation (1983 film), a British animated film
- On Probation (2005 film), an Argentine comedy film
