= Sales Pitch (film) =

- Directed by: Peter Lord; David Sproxton
- Production company: Aardman Animations
- Distributed by: Channel 4 Television Corporation (1983) (UK) (TV)
- Release date: 31 October 1983
- Running time: 5 min
- Country: United Kingdom
- Language: English

Sales Pitch is a 1983 animated short film created by Aardman Animations. It is one of five films released as part of the Conversation Pieces series. The film was directed and animated by Peter Lord and David Sproxton.
