= Humdrum =

- Directed by: Peter Peake
- Written by: Peter Peake
- Produced by: Julie Lockhart; Carla Shelley; Michael Rose; David Sproxton; Peter Lord
- Starring: Moray Hunter; Jack Docherty
- Cinematography: Jeremy Hogg; Toby Howell; Andy MacCormack
- Edited by: Nick Upton; Ben Jones; James Mather; Tamsin Parry
- Music by: Andy Price
- Production companies: Aardman Animations; Channel 4 Television Corporation; Canal+ Premiere
- Release date: 1998 (UK)
- Running time: 7 minutes
- Country: United Kingdom
- Language: English

Humdrum is a 1998 British animated comedy short film directed by Peter Peake. It was released in 1998 and produced by Aardman Animations

== Plot summary ==
The film features two anonymous Scottish-accented Shadow Puppets (voiced by Jack Docherty and Moray Hunter) who are sitting around a table with nothing to do. They explore and reject several options including watching television (the only thing on is 'some weird animation thing'), listening to the radio (but 'it's all the same rubbish these days' - in this case La Cucaracha) and playing chess (the white pieces have been eaten due to a bet). This is briefly interrupted when the doorbell rings and one character answers it to find a pesky dog (who is, in fact, a double-glazing salesman) before the other persuades him to enter into a game of shadow puppets. The first character is frustrated by his acquaintance's appalling representation of a cow and later his failure to recognize a rather fantastic rabbit (His misled guesses include a 'fireman chasing an igloo' and an 'Otter with two sausage strapped to his head'). After an amusing outburst from the poor fellow, his annoying partner accuses him of being 'shirty'. This leads him to explode, furiously crying "I'm stuck indoors playing 'Guess the misshapen beast' with someone who clearly wouldn't recognise a rabbit if it came to his house for tea, said 'What's up Doc?' and started burrowing into his head! There are blind people with no fingers who are better at shadow puppets than you! No wonder I'm a tad miffed!" An awkward silence follows this, until the doorbell rings and the first character goes to answer it and finds the second character's 'cow' shadow puppet, which moos. Despite being disappointed with being wrong about a cow's appearance, he simply responds to this with a cheery "Not today, thank you." and closes the door in front of the camera, thus ending the animation.

== Cast ==
- Jack Docherty
- Moray Hunter

== Film technique ==
The film employs a distinctive stop-motion cutout animation technique to animate the shadow puppets, making them move in ways that traditional shadow puppets cannot but retaining the impression of being projected onto everyday backgrounds.

== Credits ==
- Lighting Camera: Andy MacCormack, Jeremy Hogg, Toby Howell
- Design: Peter Peake
- Music: Andy Price
- Editor: Nick Upton
- Script Doctor: Richard Goleszowski
- Dubbing Editors: James Mather, Ben Jones
- Dialogue Editor: Tamsin Parry
- Sparks: John Bradley, John Truckle
- Technical Boffs: Janet Legg, Alan Yates
- Titles: Marc Day
- Cutting Room Assistant: Maggie O'Connor
- Production Assistants: Lisa Pavitt, Margaret House-Hayes
- Heap Big Thanks to: The Puppet Factory, Big Fat Studios, Pete Atkin, Maxine Guest, Claire Jennings, Terry Krejzl, Helen Nabarro, Lynda Ware
- Producers: Carla Shelley, Michael Rose
- Associate Producer: Julie Lockhart
- Executive Producers: Peter Lord, David Sproxton
- Written and Directed by: Peter Peake

== Awards and nominations ==
Received an Academy Award nomination for Best Animated Short Film and a BAFTA nomination in the same category.

== See also ==
- List of stop-motion films
- Silhouette animation (a similar technique but with the light coming from behind)
