= Cod Steaks =

British model making company

- Company type: Private company
- Industry: Animation
- Founded: 1980; 45 years ago
- Founder: Susannah Lipscombe
- Headquarters: Bristol, United Kingdom
- Key people: Susannah Lipscombe
- Products: Model making, set building, visual effects and exhibition
- Website: www.codsteaks.com

Cod Steaks is a British scale model making company most notable for building sets and props for Aardman Animations productions, including all Wallace & Gromit feature films. The company is based in Bristol and builds miniatures for feature films, commercials and music videos.

== History ==
Cod Steaks was founded in 1980 by Susannah Lipscombe and started out as a small model making company in the centre of the city of Bristol, UK. Over the following decades it evolved, moving further into the film industry, building full sets, props, costumes and miniatures for feature films, commercials and music videos.

The company moved to a larger location in 2004, allowing it to take on larger projects and incorporating new technology to produce sets and exhibitions faster and more efficiently.

In 2015, the company designed and built a two life-sized whales that swim through an ocean of 70,000 plastic bottles as part of an art installation initiated by Artist Project Earth. In 2021 the company designed a play and retail experience called Hamleys Play for a mall in Mumbai, India.

== Armouron ==
Cod Steaks expanded into the toy design industry in 2010 with the development of Armouron, a role-play toy with interchangeable armour elements. The concept won an award at the 2010 Toy Fair and is being marketed by Bandai.
