= Down and Out (film) =

1979 British animated film

- Production companies: Aardman Animations; BBC Bristol
- Distributed by: British Broadcasting Corporation (BBC) (1977) (UK) (TV)
- Release date: 13 March 1979 (originally made in 1977)
- Running time: 5 min
- Country: UK
- Language: English

Down and Out is a 1979 short film created by Aardman Animations. It is part of the Animated Conversations series. In this short, creators David Sproxton and Peter Lord "applied the groundbreaking technique of using recorded conversations of real people as the basis for the script".

== History ==
David Sproxton said "That was the first film of five minutes we had ever made and the first we had ever done using found sound, produced by a big producer called Colin Thomas. We sent [ex-BBC producer Jeremy Isaacs] the small amount of work we had, which was basically Down and Out and some kids' stuff. And he called us up to the London office...and said 'I've seen that film Down and Out. We'd like ten of those for our first week's transmission.'" These were the 5 shorts of Conversation Pieces, and later the five short of the Lip Synch series.

According to Aardman Animation,

Peter and David had always thought there was an adult audience for animated films, and in 1978 made two short films using real-life soundtracks, for BBC Bristol under the guidance of Colin Thomas. Although these two films ('Down and Out' and 'Confessions of a Foyer Girl') were disregarded by the BBC [until] they were seen a couple of years later by Jeremy Isaacs who was creating the shape of the newly formed Channel Four. This led directly to the commissioning of five similarly constructed films ('Conversation Pieces').

== Production ==
This was the first film to use the technique developed by Sproxton and Lordan of "animating puppet characters to spontaneous, realistic conversations, rather than prepared scripts...It impressed producer Jeremy Isaacs, who commissioned five five-minute films [entitled Conversation Pieces] for the newly established Channel 4 in London. Animated Documentary explains "Confessions of a Foyer Girl and Down and Out were based on eavesdropped conversations and pair documentary sound with stop motion animation of Plasticine figures.
