= Comfort (fabric softener) =

Fabric softener brand

- Current owner: Unilever
- Country: UK
- Introduced: 1969; 57 years ago
- Markets: Worldwide
- Tagline: Softness is the feeling called Comfort.

Comfort is a British fabric softener brand marketed by Unilever. The range includes Comfort Pure (for delicate skin) and Comfort Crème (a premium brand). Scents include Passion Flower and Ylang Ylang, Lily and Riceflower, Wild Pear and Ginkgo and the Original Comfort Blue.

The product is sold as Soft in Chile, Badin in Israel and Molto in Indonesia and has similar variants to Comfort.

== History ==
Comfort was the first fabric softener to be launched in the UK in 1969. Today Comfort is a global brand, operating in Europe, Asia, Latin America and the Middle East.

1984 saw the launch of the first concentrated fabric softener for Comfort, which was three times more concentrated than regular fabric conditioner.

In the 1990s, the Comfort brand went through a number of changes: a new logo and more modern packaging in 1992 and the first fully in 2022 its logo had another rebrand. biodegradable formulation in 1993. In 1998, Comfort replaced cartons with more environmentally-friendly and lightweight crushable bottles, introduced their first hypoallergenic fabric conditioner and launched tumble dryer sheets.

In 1997, Comfort was introduced in the Philippines as a fabric conditioner brand until it was discontinued in 2003. It was reintroduced in the Philippines in 2019 but discontinued again in the early 2020s.

In 2004, Comfort produced the first ever fabric softener capsules in the UK, Comfort Pearls. In 2005 Comfort launched a premium variant called Comfort Crème.

=== Scents and variants ===
- Comfort Blue (Now Blue Skies)
- Comfort Silk
- Comfort Pure
- Comfort Ultra
- Comfort Garden Fresh
- Comfort Vitality
- Comfort Easy Iron
- Comfort Fast Dry
- Comfort Passion Flower & Ylang Ylang
- Comfort Lavender Bloom (South Africa)
- Comfort Lily & Rice Flower
- Comfort Wild Pear & Ginkgo
- Comfort Mango & Citrus (Limited Edition)
- Comfort Mandarin & Green Tea
- Comfort Creme Almond
- Comfort Creme Jojoba
- Comfort Sunshine (Now Sunshiny Days)
- Comfort Naturals Aloe Vera
- Comfort Naturals Olive Blossom
- Comfort Naturals Jojoba & Orchid
- Comfort Tropical
- Comfort Tempting Nature
- Comfort Rainforest
- Comfort Twilight Sensations Jasmine & Black Gardenia
- Comfort Twilight Sensations Vanilla
- Comfort Exhilarations Strawberry & Lily
- Comfort Exhilarations Blueberry & Jasmine
- Comfort Exhilarations Melon & Lotus Flower
- Comfort Exhilarations Bluebell & Bergamot
- Comfort Bright Whites
- Comfort Bright Colours
- Comfort Original was available in 1 and 2 litre sizes.
- Comfort Concentrate was originally available in 500ml; it is now available in 750ml, 1.5 litres, and 3 litres.
- Comfort Professional is available in 5 litre cartons.
- Comfort Forme
- Comfort Vaporesse
- Comfort Creations
- Comfort Care Detergent (Philippines and Vietnam)
- Comfort Ultimate Care

== Advertising: Clothworld ==
Comfort's current advertising features a world made of cloth, known as Clothworld. The campaign follows the adventures of the Clothworld people, who take care of themselves using different Comfort products.

The Clothworld campaign first appeared in 2000 and was created by Unilever and Ogilvy and Mather. The original Clothworld characters were teenage couple Lisa Weaver and Darren Denim, who were made by Aardman Animations, the creators of Wallace & Gromit.

Gradually, new members of Lisa's family (her mum Karen and sister Daisy) have been introduced, as well as other inhabitants of Clothworld, including Quinitin the beautician, Stitcher the school bully, Satina the soul diva and more recently, Dr Comfy.

The latest additions to Clothworld are Jeannie and Cardboard Man. The current television advertisement features Jeannie walking through a cloth French Riviera styled town. Her flexible jeans contrast with the stiffness of Cardboard Man.

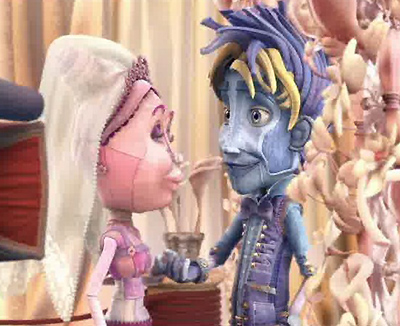
Andy (right) when married with his wife, Lily. (Comfort Vietnam, 2007)

The Clothworld campaign has travelled the world, running across Europe, Latin America, the Middle East and has recently launched in Asia. As the campaign has spread globally, the Clothworld characters are becoming popular in their own right with the Lisa and Darren character dolls selling on EBay as collector's items. In Asia, the campaign is slightly different. Darren has been transformed into a popstar named Andy. The character Andy now has his own real world record and fan base. As of 2012, the Comfort television commercials and advertising campaign features the happy-go-lucky Cloth family (Comfy family in South Africa and Vietnam), consists of Andy the Fresh Father, Daisy the Fragrant Mother (appears with green bob hair and green dress), their daughter Lisa (also known as Lizzy in Spain and Latin America and Ly in Vietnam), and their twin sons Billy and Benny.

Comfort has also grown a group of advocates for its Comfort Pure brand. They are known as the Comfort-eers and are an army of mothers who state that they believe Comfort Pure is the best choice for them and their babies.

Comfort has a number of partnerships with retail brands in the UK, including Mothercare on Comfort Pure and Debenhams. Comfort also sponsors the Prima Fashion Awards.

Comfort's tagline is 'Comfort makes a good clothes day'.
