= Confessions of a Foyer Girl =

- Directed by: Peter Lord; David Sproxton
- Production companies: Aardman Animations; BBC Bristol
- Distributed by: British Broadcasting Corporation (BBC) (1978) (UK) (TV)
- Release date: 13 July 1978
- Running time: 5 min
- Country: UK
- Language: English

Confessions of a Foyer Girl is a 1978 short film created by Aardman Animations. It is part of the Animated Conversations series. In this short, creators David Sproxton and Peter Lord "applied the groundbreaking technique of using recorded conversations of real people as the basis for the script".

== Production ==
According to Aardman Animation:

Peter and David had always thought there was an adult audience for animated films, and in 1978 made two short films using real-life soundtracks, for BBC Bristol under the guidance of Colin Thomas. Although these two films (‘Down and Out’ and ‘Confessions of a Foyer Girl’) were disregarded by the BBC they were seen a couple of years later by Jeremy Isaacs who was creating the shape of the newly formed Channel Four. This led directly to the commissioning of five similarly constructed films (‘Conversation Pieces’).
