= War Story (1989 film) =

- Directed by: Peter Lord
- Produced by: Melanie Cole; Alan Gardner; Sara Mullock
- Cinematography: Andy MacCormack; Tristan Oliver; David Sproxton
- Edited by: Helen Garrard
- Production company: Aardman Animations
- Release date: 27 September 1989
- Running time: 5 min
- Country: United Kingdom
- Language: English

War Story is a 1989 animated short film created by Aardman Animations. It was directed by Peter Lord.

== Production ==
The film was commissioned by Channel 4 as part of a 5-part series of Aardman animations called "Lip Synch". The five films in the series were Creature Comforts (1989), Going Equipped (1990), Ident (1990), Next (1990) and War Story (1989). They all used vox pop interviews as their source material. This one is with Bill Perry, a genuine British World War II vet.

== Premise ==
The short animated piece uses a real interview as its soundtrack. Bill Perry relates stories about his life, his tilted house, and The Blitz of World War II in Bristol, England.

== Cast ==
- Bill Perry as Himself (voice)
- Peter Lawrence as Interviewer (voice)

== Critical reception ==
War Story received a rating of 6.3/10 from 172 users on imdb. Dr. Grob gave the film two and a half stars out of five, praising the “very tongue-in-cheek” sequences, but felt that the film “suffers from a bad soundtrack, and (Perry)’s mumblings are at times very difficult to follow, indeed.” He notes that the “blending of real interviews with original and humorous images would be perfected in ‘Creature Comforts’ by Nick Park, who also animated on this film. In this sense ‘War Story’ is an important step towards Aardman’s mature style, which was to become less serious, and more cartoony, and consequently, more commercially successful.”

=== Awards and nominations ===
This is a list of awards and nominations of War Story.

Year	Nominee / work	Award	Result
1990	Sara Mullock and Peter Lord	BAFTA Film Award for Best Animated Film	Nominated
1990	Peter Lord	Ottawa International Animation Festival Craft Prize for Best Animation	Won
1990	Peter Lord	Ottawa International Animation Festival OIAF Award for Best Film Under 10 Minutes	Won

== Preservation ==
War Story was preserved by the Academy Film Archive in 2013.
