= Early Man (film) =

2018 animated film directed by Nick Park

- British theatrical release poster
- Directed by: Nick Park
- Screenplay by: Mark Burton; James Higginson
- Story by: Mark Burton; Nick Park
- Produced by: Peter Lord; David Sproxton; Nick Park; Carla Shelley; Richard Beek
- Starring: Eddie Redmayne; Tom Hiddleston; Maisie Williams; Timothy Spall
- Cinematography: Dave Alex Riddett
- Edited by: Sim Evan-Jones
- Music by: Harry Gregson-Williams; Tom Howe
- Production companies: StudioCanal; Aardman Animations
- Distributed by: StudioCanal
- Release dates: 20 January 2018 (BFI Southbank); 26 January 2018 (United Kingdom)
- Running time: 88 minutes
- Country: United Kingdom
- Language: English
- Budget: $50 million
- Box office: $54.6 million

Early Man is a 2018 British stop motion animated sports comedy film directed by Nick Park, and written by Park, Mark Burton and James Higginson. It was produced by Aardman Animations, and stars the voices of Eddie Redmayne, Tom Hiddleston, Maisie Williams, and Timothy Spall. The film follows a tribe of primitive Stone Age valley dwellers who have to defend their land from bronze-equipped invaders in a football match.

Early Man premiered on 20 January 2018 at the BFI Southbank cinema, and was released theatrically in the United Kingdom on 26 January 2018. The film received generally positive reviews from critics, with praise for the visuals and humor, although it was considered inferior to previous Aardman works. The film was also less successful financially compared to previous Aardman offerings, grossing just $54 million against a budget of $50 million. The film was also the last Aardman animated film to be released theatrically in the United States, until Shaun the Sheep: The Beast of Mossy Bottom on September 18, 2026, as Netflix acquired streaming rights to further Aardman films in late 2019.

== Plot ==
In 2 million BC, during the Neo-Pleistocene era, an asteroid collides with Earth "near Manchester", causing the extinction of the planet's dinosaurs, but sparing a tribe of cavemen living near the impact site. Finding a roughly spherical chunk of the asteroid, the cavemen begin to kick it around because it is too hot to hold and accidentally invent the game of football. "Several eras" later during the Stone Age, the impact site has become a lush valley, inhabited by a tribe of cavemen, including Dug and his pet wild boar Hognob. One day, Dug suggests to Chief Bobnar that they should try hunting mammoths instead of rabbits as they always do, but Bobnar brushes him off, insisting the uncoordinated tribe would be unable to catch mammoths. An army led by Lord Nooth, a Bronze Age governor, drives the tribe out of the valley and into the surrounding volcanic badlands. Dug tries to attack them, but falls into a cart and is unknowingly taken to the Bronze Age city. There, he is mistaken for a footballer. To escape, he challenges Nooth's elite local team to a match with the valley at stake and promises that the tribe will work in Nooth's mines forever if they lose. Nooth accepts, knowing that he can profit from the match. Dug discovers that although his ancestors played football, the other members of his tribe are too dim to understand it. They get chased by a giant duck that destroys their only ball.

Later that night, Dug and Hognob sneak into the Bronze Age city to steal more balls, but are found out by a female vendor named Goona, who goes to the empty stadium to practise in secret. Resentful over the team's exclusion of women, she helps them steal some balls and agrees to coach the cavemen. Goona points out that the footballers on Nooth's team are talented but too egotistical to work together effectively. The cavemen improve in skill and teamwork under her coaching. Queen Oofeefa sends a message bird informing Nooth of the consequences should the cave team win. To demoralise Dug, Nooth has him brought to the mines and shows him cave paintings made by his tribe's ancestors who, although they had invented the game and taught other tribes to play it, they never won a single match to other tribes and eventually gave up football.

On the day of the match with Oofeefa in attendance, Dug announces his forfeiture as part of the deal which spares the rest of the tribe and agrees to take their place in the mines alone. However, his reinvigorated teammates arrive on the now tamed giant duck to play the match. The cavemen score an early goal, but the local team soon takes a 3-1 lead. When the cavemen manage to tie the match Nooth incapacitates the referee and takes his place, making biased calls in favour of the local team that leads to Bobnar (who was serving as the goalkeeper) being knocked out. Hognob takes his place before blocking a penalty kick, and Dug scores using a bicycle kick to win the match for the cavemen, and they win their valley back with the respect of Oofeefa, the local team, and the crowd. Nooth tries to escape and steal the crowd's admission money, but is arrested for his crimes while everyone gets their money back. Sometime later, Goona and Nooth's elite team join Dug's tribe for a hunt, but they are frightened off by the rabbit pretending to be a woolly mammoth.

== Voice cast ==
- Eddie Redmayne as Dug, a young Stone Age caveman.
- Tom Hiddleston as Lord Nooth, an evil lord of the Bronze Age City.
- Maisie Williams as Goona, a tomboyish vendor and football enthusiast in the Bronze City whom Dug befriends.
- Timothy Spall as Chief Bobnar, the chieftain of Dug's tribe and his father figure.
- Miriam Margolyes as Queen Oofeefa, the queen regnant of the Bronze Age City who Nooth works for.
- Kayvan Novak as Dino, Lord Nooth's second-in-command who also works as a referee for the football game.
  - Novak also voices Jurgend, the team captain of the Bronze City's football team.
- Rob Brydon as Brian and Bryan, two sports commentators in the Bronze Age City that work for Queen Oofeefa.
  - Brydon also voices Message Bird, a pigeon who carries messages by mimicking human speech.
  - Brydon also voices Gonad "Gaul", a member of the Bronze City's football team.
- Richard Ayoade as Treebor, a large and cowardly caveman and member of Dug's tribe who is constantly embarrassed by his mother.
- Selina Griffiths as Magma, a cavewoman and member of Dug's tribe who is the overbearing mother of Treebor.
  - Additional voices
- Johnny Vegas as Asbo, a fidgety caveman and member of Dug's tribe who often says "Champion".
- Mark Williams as Barry, a caveman and member of Dug's tribe who isn't bright and has a rock friend named Mr. Rock.
- Gina Yashere as Gravelle, an injury-prone cavewoman and member of Dug's tribe.
- Richard Webber as Grubup, a hungry caveman and member of Dug's tribe who will eat anything.
- Simon Greenall as Eemak, a warm and funny caveman and member of Dug's tribe who the other tribe has trouble understanding.
  - Greenall also voices Thongo, a strong and silent caveman and member of Dug's tribe who mostly responds with a grunt.
  - Additional voices
- Nick Park as Hognob, Dug's pet wild boar.
- Antony Bayman, Richard Beek, Tom Doggart, Tim Hands, Adrian Rhodes, Victoria Stevens, Luke Walton and Ben Whitehead as additional voices

In addition to a rabbit that Dug's tribe constantly hunts every day, a Ceratosaurus and a Triceratops, similar to the ones animated by Ray Harryhausen from One Million Years B.C., are seen fighting each other at the opening of the film prior to the asteroid striking Earth. In the end credits, they go by the name Ray (Ceratosaurus) and Harry (Triceratops).

== Production ==
As part of their contract with Dreamworks Animation, Aardman announced plans for a caveman film titled Crood Awakening in 2005. Though their partnership would end not long after this announcement, Dreamworks retained rights to Aardman's original story and developed it into the 2013 film The Croods.

In June 2007, two films were announced by Aardman, one of them being appropriately joked as an "untitled Nick Park film, which is not another Wallace & Gromit feature film." In May 2015, it was announced that the title of the film would be Early Man, and it would be financed by the British Film Institute for $50 million.

As with previous stop motion films created by Aardman, the characters in Early Man were developed over time with the voice actors to determine the way the characters look, move, and speak. The results were turned over to the film's 35 animators at the studio to work on individualising the characters. A crowd of people took part in an audio recording at the Memorial Stadium, home to Bristol Rovers.

The studio began principal photography on the film in May 2016 and wrapped on 5 October 2017.

== Competition ==
On 21 September 2017, a competition was launched on the CBBC television programme Blue Peter to design a prehistoric character inspired by Early Man, with the winner receiving the opportunity to see their character brought to life by Aardman, as well as receiving tickets to the premiere alongside the runners up. It closed on 12 October 2017, and the winner was announced in January 2018.

== Release ==
Early Man was released in the United Kingdom on 26 January 2018 by StudioCanal. StudioCanal also distributed the film in France, Germany, Australia and New Zealand. In the United States, it was released on 16 February 2018, by Lionsgate, through its Summit Entertainment label. In Canada, it was released by eOne Films on the same day.

== Reception ==
=== Box office ===
Early Man grossed only $8.2 million in North America and $46.3 million in other territories (including $15.8 million in the United Kingdom) for a worldwide gross of $54.6 million, against its budget of $50 million.

==== North America ====
In the United States and Canada, Early Man was released alongside Black Panther and was projected to gross $5–$7 million on its opening weekend at 2,494 areas. However, it made just $849K on its opening day, far below projections. It opened to just $3.1 million at the box office, and $4.2 million on its President's Day weekend, averaging just $1,279 per cinema. This placed it seventh, and with the fourth-worst opening for an animated movie playing in over 2,000 theatres at the time, below Delgo, All Dogs Go to Heaven 2 and Teacher's Pet. The poor opening was attributed to the simultaneous release of the highly anticipated Black Panther. Early Man dropped by 44.4% on its opening weekend, grossing $1.7 million and ranking tenth, while averaging $711 per theatre. On its third weekend, it dropped by 72.6% and dropped from 2,494 cinemas to just 897 cinemas. It made $486K on its third weekend, averaging just $542 per cinema.

==== International ====
The film opened in the United Kingdom on 26 January 2018, and opened at fourth with $2.8 million, it stayed at fourth for another two weeks until moving down to sixth on its fourth week, making $2.1 million on its second weekend (dropping by 25.8%), and $1.5 million on its third week (dropping by 26.3%).

The top five international markets for the movie were the United Kingdom ($15.7 million), France ($6.7 million), Spain ($3.3 million), Germany ($1.7 million) and Italy ($1.6 million).

=== Critical response ===
On review aggregator website Rotten Tomatoes, the film holds an approval rating of 80% based on 173 reviews, and an average rating of 6.6/10, making it the lowest-rated film Nick Park has made. The website's critical consensus reads, "Early Man isn't quite as evolved as Aardman's best work, but still retains the unique visuals and sweet humor that have made the studio a favorite among animation enthusiasts." On Metacritic, the film has a weighted average score of 68 out of 100, based on 39 critics, indicating "generally favourable reviews". Audiences polled by CinemaScore gave the film an average grade of "B" on an A+ to F scale.

Some critics claimed the film is an allegory for Brexit.

=== Accolades ===
Award	Category	Nominee(s)	Result
46th Annie Awards	Annie Award for Best Animated Feature	"Early Man"	Nominated
46th Annie Awards	Outstanding Achievement for Animated Effects in an Animated Feature Production	Howard Jones, Dave Alex Riddett, Grant Hewlett, Pat Andrew and Elena Vitanza Chiarani	Nominated
46th Annie Awards	Annie Award for Directing in a Feature Production	Nick Park	Nominated
46th Annie Awards	Outstanding Achievement for Character Animation in an Animated Feature Production	Laurie Sitzia	Nominated
46th Annie Awards	Annie Award for Music in a Feature Production	Harry Gregson-Williams and Tom Howe	Nominated
46th Annie Awards	Outstanding Achievement for Production Design in an Animated Feature Production	Matt Perry and Richard Edmunds	Nominated
46th Annie Awards	Annie Award for Voice Acting in a Feature Production	Eddie Redmayne	Nominated
British Independent Film Awards	Best Effects	Howard Jones	Won
Hollywood Music in Media Awards	Original Song – Animated Film	“Good Day”, Written and performed by New Hope Club	Nominated
People's Choice Awards	The Family Movie of 2018	Early Man	Shortlisted

== Soundtrack ==
The soundtrack, titled Early Man: (Original Motion Picture Soundtrack), was released under Mercury Records on 26 January 2018, the day of the film's release.

== See also ==
- List of association football films
