= Owzat =

- Directed by: Mark Brierley; David Sproxton
- Written by: Mark Brierley
- Produced by: Peter Lord; David Sproxton; Dave Throssell
- Cinematography: Mark Brierley
- Edited by: Richard Atherton
- Production companies: Aardman Animations; TJFX
- Release date: 1997
- Running time: 4 minutes, 50 seconds
- Country: United Kingdom
- Language: English

Owzat is a 1997 CGI short film created by Aardman Animations. The title is a shortened form of "How's that?", the traditional call used to request rulings from an umpire during a game of cricket.

== Plot ==
Teams of ghosts and skeletons gather in a church graveyard for a midnight game of cricket under a full moon. One skeleton batsman repeatedly hits the ball into the gravestones and monuments, damaging them and irritating the ghosts' bowler. After one hit flies into the belfry, striking the bell and sending it crashing to the ground, the ghosts confront the batsman with photographs of the damage he has caused. He ignores these and dares the ghosts to continue the game. When the next ball is bowled, the batsman knocks it into the weather vane mounted atop the belfry; it ricochets into the sky and shatters the moon as if it were a light bulb, leaving the graveyard in total darkness.

== Production ==
The film's delivery format was Betacam SP. The CGI animating and modelling was done using Softimage 3D.

The film was shown at the 1998 International Film Festival Rotterdam under the theme "exploding cinema", and the 1998 Holland International Film Festival under the theme "Nieuwe media".

== Critical reception ==
On IMDb, Owzat received a rating of 5.2/10 from 105 users.
