= Gulp (film) =

- Directed by: Will Studd; Sumo Science; Ed Patterson
- Music by: Will Grove-White
- Production companies: Nokia; Aardman Animations
- Release date: 2011
- Running time: 2 minutes
- Country: UK
- Language: English

Gulp is a 2011 British animated short film by Aardman Animations working with Wieden + Kennedy and filmed on Nokia N8 smart phone, then Nokia's top-of-the-range. It is considered a spiritual successor to another Aardman short, Dot. Gulp was filmed "on the world’s largest stop-motion set". The film run-time is under two minutes, and is followed by a behind-the-scenes featurette. The co-directors were Will Studd and Sumo Science.

== Production ==
The film was shot on a Nokia N8, which was suspended over a beach. Sand sculptures were used in the production with other props. Nokia Conversation explains "Breaking the Guinness world record, the largest scene in the film stretches over 11,000 square feet".

Jay Clarke was the storyboard Artist for "Gulp".

== Plot ==
ShortOfTheWeek describes the plot as "a Jonah-style adventure of a fisherman getting caught in a belly of a giant fish".
