= Aardboiled =

British animation channel

- Network: YouTube

Programming
- Language: English

Ownership
- Owner: Aardman Animations

History
- Launched: 15 August 2017; 9 years ago
- Closed: 3 May 2023; 3 years ago

Availability

Streaming media
- YouTube: Aardboiled

Aardboiled was a British animation channel owned by Aardman Animations. It launched in 2017 until it was ceased in 2023.

== Programming ==
- Clod
- Tony Talks
- Muggins & Tuggins
- Ploppenstoppen
- Don't Mix Us Up
- Evil Genius
