= Stage Fright (1997 film) =

- Title card from the movie
- Directed by: Steve Box
- Written by: Steve Box
- Produced by: Steve Box; Peter Lord; Helen Nabarro; Nick Park; Michael Rose; David Sproxton
- Starring: Graham Fellows
- Cinematography: Tristan Oliver
- Edited by: Edward Jarvis
- Music by: Julian Nott
- Distributed by: Aardman Animations; Channel Four
- Release date: 19 November 1997
- Running time: 11 minutes
- Country: United Kingdom
- Language: English

Stage Fright is a 1997 stop-motion short film written and directed by Steve Box, it follows Tiny, a vaudeville performer and dog trainer, as he tries to cope with being overshadowed by the rise of film. All of the characters are voiced by Graham Fellows. The film won the 1998 BAFTA Award for Best Short Animation.

== Plot ==
Tiny, a dog trainer, hides with his dogs in a wicker basket on the stage of an abandoned vaudeville theater. He emerges to have them practice a trick, attacking a tattered straw boater hat on command. When a second man, Arnold Hugh, emerges menacingly onto the stage, Tiny fearfully backs away from him and falls into the orchestra pit, getting his clothes snagged on a broken plank.

Years earlier, Tiny had found one of his dogs missing while performing his trained-dog act in the theater. Even though he fears that the crowd no longer likes the act, his friend Daphne encourages him to go on with the show. He is booed off the stage in favor of a silent movie, which stars Arnold and Daphne and features the missing dog, taken by Daphne. Arnold pressures her not to tell Tiny about the theft and goes on to make a string of successful movies with Daphne and the dogs. He takes all the credit for Tiny's training of the dogs, while Daphne reluctantly keeps his secret.

Tiny trains the dogs to jump up and place a boater on his head at his command. When Arnold uses this trick in one of his movies, though, it fails because he is taller than Tiny; he confronts Tiny and threatens to torture the animals unless they can reach his height. Angered, Tiny re-trains them to attack instead, prompting Arnold to leave the studio for the confrontation seen at the beginning of the film once he finds out. Daphne decides that she no longer wants to work with Arnold and follows him to the theater.

Daphne swings a sandbag across the stage, knocking Arnold down, and confesses her involvement to Tiny. Arnold gets up and begins to strangle Daphne, so Tiny delivers the 'attack' command. The dogs advance menacingly toward Arnold; he pulls a metal latch off the wall to use as a weapon, but this releases the movie screen, which falls on Arnold's head and kills him.

Daphne sees no sign of Tiny when she turns back to the orchestra pit, until he is lifted into view on the organ that had been used to provide background music for Arnold's movies. It now glows white, being played by a spectral organist; Tiny climbs off, unhurt, but Arnold's spirit rises from his body and steps on at the organist's beckoning. The organ then swiftly drops out of sight, carrying a terrified Arnold down to the Underworld. As the theater begins to collapse, Daphne persuades Tiny to overcome his fear of rejection and leave with her. They and the dogs exit into the light of the outside world.

== Production ==
When the movie screen crashes onto Arnold Hugh's head and kills him, he knocks over a bucket with his foot, playing on the classic idiom "kick the bucket". This gag was inspired by a scene in It's a Mad, Mad, Mad, Mad World, wherein Jimmy Durante's character, Smiler Grogan, literally kicks a bucket as he dies.

The Organist that appears at the beginning of the short and later near the end, who shows his spectral self and beckons Arnold Hugh's ghost to the underworld, bears a strong resemblance to Oogie Boogie from Tim Burton's 1993 stop-motion film, The Nightmare Before Christmas.

Classic stock sound effects were used at several points throughout the short.

== Reception ==
Dr. Grob gave the film two stars out of five, praising the “excellent stop motion animation, and some atmospheric lighting”, but felt that “Steve Box is no Nick Park”, citing his “way of non-linear story telling (as) confusing and heavy-handed. Because they’re not introduced properly we don’t care about the characters one bit. Worse, throughout the film the relationship between the three characters remains sketchy and trite. Add way too much dialogue, and the result is as disappointing as it is boring. The only interesting part is Box’s emulation of silent cinema using his clay characters.”

=== Awards ===
Stage Fright won a 1998 BAFTA Award for Best Short Animated Film. It was also nominated for Crystal Star for Best European Short at the 1998 Brussels International Film Festival, for the Jury Award at the 1998 Palm Springs International Festival of Short Films, as well as the Best Animated Film Award at the 1998 Molodist International Film Festival.
