= Going Equipped (film) =

- Directed by: Peter Lord
- Produced by: Sara Mullock
- Cinematography: Fred Reed; Dave Alex Riddett; Susannah Shaw; David Sproxton
- Edited by: William Ennals
- Production company: Aardman Animations
- Distributed by: Channel Four Television Corporation
- Release date: 29 November 1990
- Running time: 5 min
- Country: United Kingdom
- Language: English

Going Equipped is an animated short film created by Aardman Animations. It was directed by Peter Lord.

== Production ==
The short was commissioned by Channel 4 as part of a five-part series of Aardman animations called "Lip Synch". The five films in the series were Creature Comforts (1989), Going Equipped (1990), Ident (1990), Next (1989) and War Story (1989).

== Plot ==
Imdb explains: "A young man in prison is interviewed and talks about his life, how he got into prison, and what it's like doing time."

== Cast ==
- Derek Robinson - Himself / interviewer

== Critical reception ==
Going Equipped received a rating of 6.3/10 from 69 users. The One-Line Review "Highly Recommended" the short, and said it "proves to be a melancholy minor-masterpiece and one of Aardman Animations best works." Animator Mag said "Peter [Lord]'s contribution was a view of life in and out of prison seen through the eyes of a young offender. It is based on a real-life taped interview. The animation is smooth and realistic although watching a plasticine figure acting in a realistic way makes the words even more poignant than if the actual person had been filmed."
