= Steve Box =

English animator and director

- Born: Steven Royston Box; Bristol, England
- Occupations: Animator, director, writer, producer
- Years active: 1984–present
- Awards: Academy Award for Best Animated Feature; Wallace & Gromit: The Curse of the Were-Rabbit (2005)

Steven Royston Box is an English animator and director who previously collaborated with Aardman Animations.

His early work in animation included the popular British claymation television series The Trap Door for Bristol-based animation studio CMTB Animation.

Box joined Aardman Animations in 1990. He directed the video for the Spice Girls' "Viva Forever" in 1998. He won a BAFTA Award in 1998 for his 11-minute animated film Stage Fright which he wrote, directed and produced. He also provided the voice for the character of Vince in the TV series Rex the Runt.

He was the key animator for Aardman's film Chicken Run and was an animator for the Wallace & Gromit films The Wrong Trousers and A Close Shave, before co-writing and co-directing the feature film Wallace & Gromit: The Curse of the Were-Rabbit with Nick Park. The film scooped his second BAFTA and his first Academy Award for Best Animated Feature. The film has also collected another 22 international awards and 12 other nominations for other awards. The film was a massive success at the Annie Awards where it won 10 Annie awards out of its 16 nominations.

In late 2017, Box was announced as the director behind the TV series, Moominvalley, based on the Moomins series. After a successful crowdfunding campaign, the series made its debut in 2019. In June 2022, it was announced that he is working on an original animated film for Netflix.

== See also ==
- List of Academy Award winners and nominees from Great Britain
