= On Probation (1983 film) =

- Directed by: Peter Lord; David Sproxton
- Written by: Peter Lord; David Sproxton
- Production companies: Aardman Animations; Channel Four Films
- Distributed by: Channel 4 Television Corporation (1983) (UK) (TV)
- Release date: 1 November 1983
- Running time: 5 min
- Country: United Kingdom
- Language: English

On Probation is a 1983 animated short film created by Aardman Animations. It is one of five films released as part of the Conversation Pieces series.
