= Purple and Brown =

2006 British animated series

- Written by: Rich Webber
- Directed by: Rich Webber
- Voices of: Rich Webber; Mike Percival
- Composer: Mark Thomas
- Country of origin: United Kingdom
- Original language: English

Production
- Producers: Ben Lock; South Pacific Pictures
- Editor: Mike Percival
- Running time: 5 minutes
- Production companies: Aardman Animations; Nickelodeon UK

Original release
- Network: Nickelodeon (United Kingdom)
- Release: 13 February 2006 – 2009

Purple and Brown is a British stop-motion animated short television series made in collaboration with Nickelodeon and Aardman Animations, the creators of Wallace and Gromit. The series was devised and directed by Rich Webber and edited by Mike Percival, who also offered the voices of the characters, and first aired in February 2006, on Nickelodeon's UK and Ireland channel, and then later became a staple on the US Nickelodeon network as part of its former Nick Extra short program.

== Background ==
The series was devised and was directed by Webber and edited by Mike Percival. They also provided the voices of the characters, Webber being Purple and Percival voicing Brown. The series was originally set to launch on 13 February 2006, on Nickelodeon's channel in the United Kingdom. Despite the series' conclusion in 2007, a 7-minute special, titled Space, was made in 2009 but left unaired. According to Percival's public CV, the 7-minute episode was made for a cancelled US special of Purple and Brown. In September 2022 Webber published the episode on his YouTube channel. Photos of the making of Space can be seen on the blog of sculptor Dhimant Vyas, who was involved in the creation.

Purple and Brown is a creation of Aardman, who also animated Wallace and Gromit, Creature Comforts, Angry Kid and Morph.

== Storyline ==
The storyline is led by the characters of two clay blob friends, one purple and the other brown and named after their colours, who are caught in ridiculous situations. Purple and Brown never speak, but they understand everything. Despite any given predicament, the duo can never help but giggle with a low, recognisable laugh.

== Reception ==
In 2007, Cartoon Brew offered a mild criticism of Aardman's recent work, but wrote that Purple and Brown marked "a wonderful return to their roots", and that the concept is "beautifully animated and hilariously executed".

== Episodes ==
1. Snowman (2006) - 15 seconds
2. Spaghetti (2006) - 19 seconds
3. Weewee (2006) - 21 seconds
4. Irish Jig (2006) - 54 seconds (shortened version), 2 minutes and 8 seconds (extended version)
5. Seagull (2006) - 22 seconds
6. Christmas (2006) - 59 seconds
7. Speedy (2006) - 1 minute and 2 seconds
8. Big Green Thing (2006) - 1 minute and 2 seconds
9. Alien 2 (2006) – 11 seconds
10. Magic Ball (2006)
11. Beardly (2006) - 11 seconds
12. Sleep (2006) - 1 minute and 2 seconds
13. Balloon (2006) - 22 seconds
14. Whistlers (2006) - 1 minute and 5 seconds
15. Hammer (2007) - 11 seconds
16. Beach Ball (2007) - 12 seconds
17. Colour (2007) - 7 seconds
18. Sun Screen (2007) - 9 seconds
19. Paint (2007) - 11 seconds

=== Unused ===
- Mix Together
- Cheese Heads
- Fire Against Water
- Space

== Awards ==
- 2006, Won BAFTA award for best Children's Short
