= Shaun the Sheep (video game) =

2008 video game

- Developer(s): Art Co., Ltd
- Publisher(s): D3 Publisher
- Series: Shaun the Sheep
- Platform(s): Nintendo DS
- Release: NA: September 23, 2008; EU: September 26, 2008
- Genre(s): Action
- Mode(s): Single-player

Shaun the Sheep is a 2008 adventure game developed by Art Co., Ltd and published by D3Publisher's America and Europe branches for the Nintendo DS handheld console. The game is based on the popular Aardman Animations series of the same name and was released on September 23, 2008 in the United States. In the game, Shaun must find and rescue the sheep before the farmer gets home.

== Gameplay ==
Shaun is controlled by the control pad or the stylus while walking, exploring or solving problems in a fully 3D area with 3D characters around. While most sheep are not difficult to find, some sheep, like Timmy or Shirley, require a minigame to be started in order to be rescued. Every time enough achievements are reached, new areas are unlocked to find more sheep.

== Plot ==
The sheep have escaped and Shaun must find the rest of the flock before the Farmer comes home. Gamers play as Shaun and interact with characters such as Shirley, Timmy, Bitzer and more as they adventure through their scenes and explore areas from the series like the junk pile, the sheep pool and the circus tent. Players utilize the DS touchscreen and microphone as they experience three different gameplay modes: Story Mode, Mini-game Mode and Collection Mode and maneuver around obstacles, access hidden areas, and try their hand at eight unlockable mini-games and eight collectible slide puzzles. Five "micro" games offer players more interactivity and depth by showcasing memorable moments from the show such as saving Timmy from the circus high wire or making a ball of wool to distract Pidsley the cat.

== Reception ==
Reception

Aggregate score
Aggregator	Score
Metacritic	58/100

Review score
Publication	Score
IGN	6.5/10

The game received "mixed or average" reviews, according to review aggregator Metacritic, which holds an aggregate score of 58 out of 100. IGN called it a fun point-and-click adventure, noting that fans of the animated show will enjoy it, but also said that the game should have more depth and more mini-games.
