= Minotaur and Little Nerkin =

- Directed by: Nick Mackie
- Produced by: Helen Brunsdon
- Music by: Stuart Gordon
- Production companies: Films at 59; Aardman Features; Softimage 3D; Photoshop 5
- Release date: 2000 (DVD)
- Running time: 2 min
- Country: United Kingdom
- Language: English

Minotaur and Little Nerkin is a 1999 British film. Its full name appears, according to the film itself, to be Minotaur and Little Nerkin in Bait, suggesting that its name is in fact "Bait", as an episode of a suggested series of films called Minotaur and Little Nerkin, of which no other episodes were made, or that the name of the film is Bait and is merely stating it stars Minotaur and Little Nerkin. Minotaur and Little Nerkin is the name used on the packaging for the Movie DVD.

== Plot ==
Imdb explains the synopsis: "What could possibly tempt the tastebuds of an anthropomorphized bull and his tiny duck-like friend? A severed hand! Dee-lish! But be careful - we've heard that baked hand causes heartburn!"

A green duck, Little Nerkin, passes the house of the Minotaur who invites him in, while dancing to music (a version of "Walk Don't Run", originally by The Ventures). After Nerkin walks in the house, he sees a severed hand bouncing on the table and convinces Minotaur to cook it for him. After heating the hand in the microwave, Minotaur serves the hand to Nerkin, who swallows it whole. However, the hand causes heartburn, which leads to Nerkin's death. It is then revealed that it was all a part of Minotaur's plan to cook and eat Nerkin.

== Characters ==
- Minotaur
- Little Nerkin
- Severed hand

== Production ==
Films at 59 was responsible for the sound. The film is in CGI, and was produced in Softimage 3D and Photoshop 5.

The film was included in the Aardman Classics VHS and DVD from 2000.

== Critical reception ==
On imdb, Minotaur and Little Nerkin received a rating of 4.4/10 from 94 users as of February 2016.

Dr. Grob's Animation Review gave the film two stars out of five, saying whilst the film is "remarkable for its morbid humor and original technique, it is nonetheless an ugly and unfunny film, that fails to entertain, let alone impress the viewer." However, Aardman had included it on their compilation release of Aardman Classics, composed of some of their short films they consider to be classic.
