= Carla Shelley =

English producer

- Born: 26 June 1965 (age 60); England
- Occupation: Producer
- Years active: 1992–present

Carla Shelley (born 26 June 1965) is an English producer for Aardman Animations and Birdbox Studio.

She produced A Close Shave, Humdrum, Wallace & Gromit: The Curse of the Were-Rabbit, Arthur Christmas, and Early Man.

She was also a line producer for Chicken Run.

She was also an executive producer for The Pirates! In an Adventure with Scientists!, A Shaun the Sheep Movie: Farmageddon, Chicken Run: Dawn of the Nugget, and Wallace & Gromit: Vengeance Most Fowl.

She was also a co-executive producer for Shaun the Sheep Movie.

She won a BAFTA Award for her work on Wallace & Gromit film "A Close Shave".
