= Not Without My Handbag =

1993 film

- Opening titles
- Directed by: Boris Kossmehl
- Written by: Boris Kossmehl; Andrea Friedrich
- Produced by: Christopher Moll
- Starring: Geraldine McEwan; Andrea Friedrich; Alain Debray; Robert Booth
- Cinematography: Andy MacCormack; Fred Reed
- Edited by: David McCormick
- Music by: Julian Nott
- Production companies: Aardman Animations; Channel Four Films
- Distributed by: Channel Four Television Corporation
- Release date: 14 November 1993
- Running time: 12 minutes
- Country: United Kingdom
- Language: English

Not Without My Handbag is a 1993 British stop-motion animated comedy horror short film created by animator Boris Kossmehl at Aardman Animations. The film is about a deceased aunt who forgets to take a proper handbag on her journey to Hell.

== Plot ==
A girl lives with her aunt in a small house. One day, the aunt gets late for a washing machine payment. When reading the contract, she finds out that “on non-payment of installments, the contractee shall go to Hell without further notice.” She makes a phone call for a devil who lives in Hell and when he arrives, he kills her by giving her a heart attack. The girl witnesses her getting dropped to Hell, and then puts her aunt's dead body under a grave she had made.

Meanwhile, while falling down the yellow spiral that leads to Hell, the aunt feels that she has forgotten something and starts to return to find out what it is, avoiding the devil. When returning as a skeleton, she explains to her niece that she forgot to take her treasured accessory, a proper handbag.

That night, the devil returns and transforms into a handbag when eating the handbag. He causes havoc around the house: he attacks and eats a mouse, and raids the refrigerator, until the girl catches him, but the devil kidnaps her in the washing machine.

The next morning, the aunt looks for her handbag and she finds the devil torturing her niece in the washing machine and says that the monster is a very cheap imitation. The devil says he will give her a cheap imitation and starts dragging her back to Hell again, but the girl stops him with a bakery's worth of food. The devil eats the cakes and pastries and grows big and fat. The girl feeds him a chocolate éclair and the devil explodes with a loud BANG, releasing the handbag, which lands in front of its owner's feet. The aunt says she would visit anytime her niece wants, telling her to remember to always read the small prints before she buys and also to avoid any cheap imitations. She and the girl bid each other farewell.

== Cast ==
- Geraldine McEwan as The Aunt
- Andrea Friedrich as The Girl
- Alain Debray as The Devil / The Handbag
- Robert Booth as Newsreader

== Critical reception ==
German review site AllesFilm said Not Without My Handbag was "one of the best Aardman short films", and complemented its humour, visuals, deranged tone, and "genius fun".
