= Animated Conversations =

Animated Conversations is a series of short animated films, two of which were made by Aardman Animations.

== List of shorts ==
- Animated Conversations: Down and Out (1977)
- Animated Conversations: Confessions of a Foyer Girl (1978)
