= Conversation Pieces =

Conversation Pieces is a reworking of the Animated Conversations concept. It consists of a series of five shorts which aired on Channel Four between 1982 and 1983. Each short was five minutes long.

As summarized in "All About Aardman": "plasticine personalities enact scenarios suggested by documentary-style recorded dialogue".

Aardman commissioned Nulight Studios to remaster the shorts from their original 16mm film reels to digital 4K. In July 2018, the remastered shorts were premiered along with three earlier Aardman films at the Cinema Rediscovered film festival in Bristol.

== List of shorts ==
- On Probation (1983)
- Sales Pitch (1983)
- Palmy Days (1983)
- Early Bird (1983)
- Late Edition (1983)
