= David Sproxton =

Co-founder of Aardman Animations studio (born 1954)

Sir David Sproxton CBE
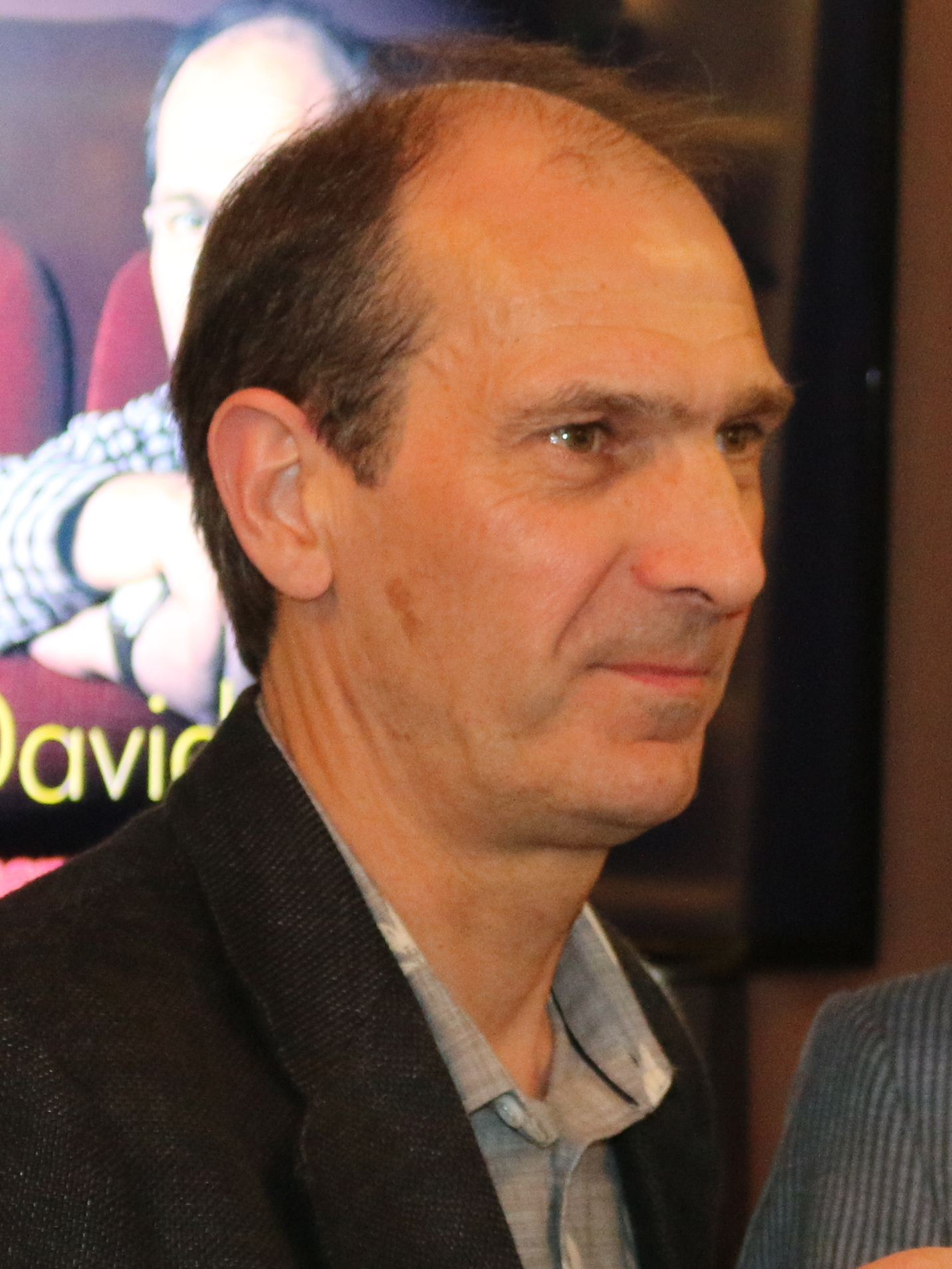
- Sproxton at the 2016 Annecy International Animated Film Festival
- Born: David Alan Sproxton; 6 January 1954 (age 72)
- Occupation: Producer
- Years active: 1977–present
- Known for: Co-founder of Aardman Animations studio

Sir David Alan Sproxton CBE (born 6 January 1954) is a British businessman and one of the co-founders, with Peter Lord, of the Aardman Animations studio.

== Education and career ==
Sproxton attended Woking Grammar School and later graduated from Collingwood College, Durham University before starting as an animator, producing segments for the Vision On TV program, Sproxton and Lord created the character of Morph for Take Hart (which featured Tony Hart, the artist from Vision On).

He is credited as the cinematographer for the BAFTA Award-nominated War Story, and the Academy Award-nominated Adam, as well as the Academy Award-winning Creature Comforts directed by Nick Park. Other production credits include Chicken Run, Wallace & Gromit: The Curse of the Were-Rabbit and Arthur Christmas.

In May 2006, Sproxton (along with Peter Lord) visited the "Aardman Exhibit" at the Ghibli Museum in Mitaka, Tokyo, Japan, where he met Hayao Miyazaki. Miyazaki has long been a fan of the Aardman Animation works.

Sproxton was appointed a Commander of the Order of the British Empire (CBE) in the 2006 Birthday Honours, and knighted in the 2026 Birthday Honours for services to the animation industry, the creative industries and to charity.
