= Aardman Animations =

British animation studio and production company

Aardman Animations Limited
- Logo used since 2022

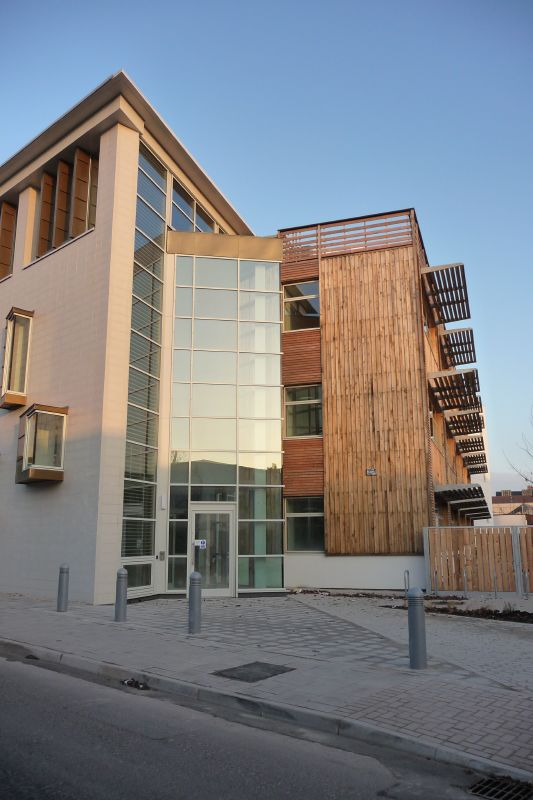
- Aardman Animations' headquarters in Bristol
- Formerly: Offshelm Limited (August–November 1986); The Aards Co. Limited (1986–1987)
- Type: Private
- Industry: Animation
- Founded: 1972; 54 years ago
- Founders: Peter Lord; David Sproxton
- Headquarters: Gas Ferry Road (Note: Headquarters), Bristol, England
- Number of locations: Aztec West (Note: Studios), Bristol, England
- Key people: Peter Lord; Nick Park; David Sproxton
- Divisions: Aardman Features; Aardman Digital; Aardman Commercials; Aardman Broadcast; Aardman International; Aardman Rights; Aardman Effects; Aardman Nathan Love; Aardboiled
- Website: aardman.com

Aardman Animations Limited, known simply as Aardman, is a British animation studio and media company based in Bristol, England with its headquarters in Gas Ferry Road and its studios in Aztec West. It is known for films and television series made using stop-motion and clay animation techniques, particularly those featuring its plasticine characters from Wallace & Gromit, Chicken Run, Shaun the Sheep, and Morph. After some experimental computer-animated short films during the late 1990s, beginning with Owzat (1997), Aardman entered the computer animation market with Planet Sketch in 2005. As of February 2020, it had earned $1.1 billion worldwide, with an average $135.6 million per film. Between 2000 and 2006, Aardman collaborated with DreamWorks Animation.

Aardman's films have been consistently well-received. Their stop-motion films are among the highest-grossing produced, with their 2000 debut, Chicken Run, being their top-grossing film, as well as the highest-grossing stop-motion film of all time. A sequel, Chicken Run: Dawn of the Nugget, was released in 2023.

== History ==
=== 1972–1996 ===
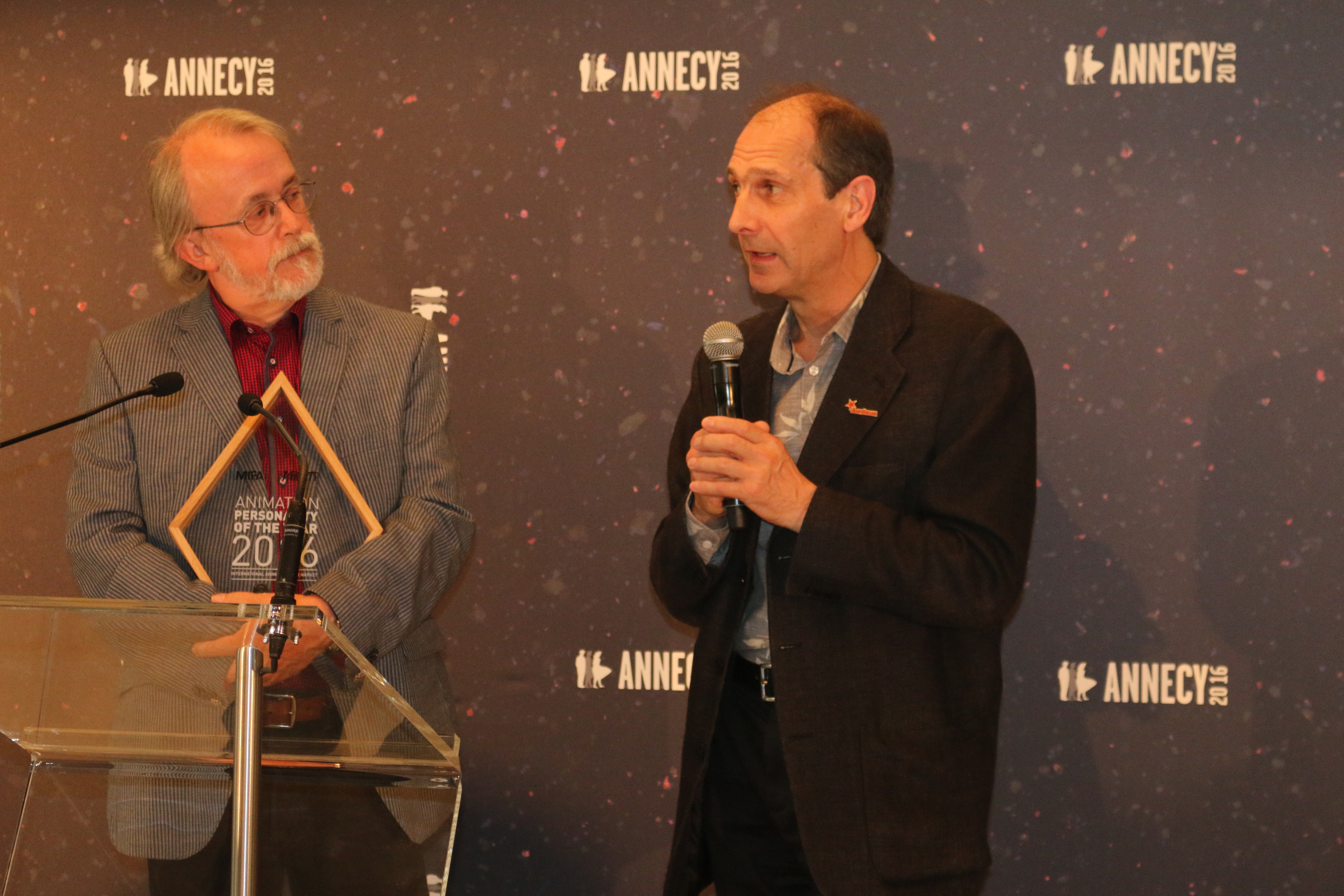
Founders Peter Lord and David Sproxton at the 2016 Annecy International Animation Film Festival, where they accepted the Animation Personality of the Year Award

Aardman was founded in 1972 as a low-budget project by Peter Lord and David Sproxton, who wanted to realise their dream of producing an animated motion picture. The collaboration provided animated sequences for the BBC series for deaf children Vision On. The company name originates from the name of their nerdy Superman character in that series, a play on the phrase 'hard man'. The process of using clay animation to produce a segment called "Gleebees" (1975) became the inspiration for creating Morph, a simple clay character. Around the same time, Lord and Sproxton made their first foray into adult animation with the shorts Down and Out and Confessions of a Foyer Girl, entries in the BBC's Animated Conversations series using real-life conversations as soundtracks.

Aardman also created the title sequence for The Great Egg Race and supplied animation for the multiple award-winning music video of Peter Gabriel's song "Sledgehammer". They produced the music video for the song "My Baby Just Cares For Me" by Nina Simone in 1987. Also in the 1980s, they created the trombone-playing character Douglas in a television commercial for Lurpak butter.

Later, Aardman produced several shorts for Channel 4, including the Conversation Pieces series. These five shorts worked in the same area as the Animated Conversations pieces, but were more sophisticated. Lord and Sproxton began hiring more animators at this point; three of the newcomers made their directorial debut at Aardman with the Lip Synch series. Of the five Lip Synch shorts, two were directed by Lord, one by Barry Purves, one by Richard Goleszowski and one by Nick Park.

In 1990, Park's short, Creature Comforts, was the first Aardman Animations film to win an Academy Award. Park also developed the clay modelled shorts featuring the adventures of Wallace & Gromit, a comical pair of friends: Wallace being a naive English inventor with a love of cheese, and Gromit, his best friend, the intelligent, muted dog. These films include A Grand Day Out (1989), The Wrong Trousers (1993) and A Close Shave (1995), the latter two winning Academy Awards.

=== 1997–2007 ===
In December 1997, Aardman, DreamWorks (now known as DreamWorks Animation) and Pathé announced that their companies were collaborating to co-finance and distribute Chicken Run, Aardman's first feature film, which had already been in pre-production for a year. On 27 October 1999, Aardman and DreamWorks signed a $250 million deal to make an additional four films that were estimated to be completed during the next 12 years. Along with the deal their first project was announced, titled The Tortoise and the Hare. Intended to be based on Aesop's fable and directed by Richard Goleszowski, it was paused two years later because of script problems. On 23 June 2000, Chicken Run was released to a great critical and financial success. In 2005, after ten years of absence, Wallace and Gromit came back in the Academy Award-winning The Curse of the Were-Rabbit. Later that year, Planet Sketch, Aardman's first computer-animated production and first international co-production, primered on CITV and Teletoon. The following year, Flushed Away, Aardman's first computer-animated film, premiered in theatres.

On 10 October 2005, a serious fire at a storage facility used by Aardman and other Bristol-based companies destroyed over 30 years of props, models, and scenery often built by the Bristol-based Cod Steaks. This warehouse was used for storage of past projects and so did not prevent the production of their current projects at the time. In addition, the company's library of finished films was stored elsewhere and was undamaged. An electrical fault was determined to be the cause of the blaze. Referring to the 2005 Kashmir earthquake, Park was quoted as saying, "Even though it is a precious and nostalgic collection and valuable to the company, in light of other tragedies, today isn't a big deal."

On 1 October 2006, right before the release of Flushed Away, The New York Times reported that due to creative differences, DreamWorks Animation and Aardman had decided to finish their agreement. The deal was officially terminated on 30 January 2007, due to the box-office underperformance of Flushed Away. According to an Aardman spokesperson: "The business model of DreamWorks no longer suits Aardman and vice versa. But the split couldn't have been more amicable." Unofficial reasons for departure were weak performances of the last two movies, for which DreamWorks had to take writedowns, and citing the article, "Aardman executives chafed at the creative control DreamWorks tried to exert, particularly with Flushed Away..." The studio had another film in development, Crood Awakening (eventually The Croods), which had been announced in 2005, with John Cleese co-writing the screenplay. With the end of the partnership, the film's rights reverted to DreamWorks.

From 2006 to 2007, the Ghibli Museum in Mitaka, Tokyo, Japan, had an exhibit featuring the works of Aardman Studios. Sproxton and Lord visited the exhibit in May 2006 and met with animator Hayao Miyazaki during the visit. Miyazaki has long been a fan of Aardman Animations' works.

=== 2007–2012 ===
In April 2007, Aardman signed and in 2010 renewed a three-year deal with Sony Pictures to finance, co-produce and distribute feature films. The next year, Aardman released a new Wallace and Gromit short film called A Matter of Loaf and Death (2008). The first film made in collaboration with Sony was the computer-animated Arthur Christmas (2011), Aardman's first 3D feature film. 2012 saw the release of The Pirates! In an Adventure with Scientists! (known internationally in America as The Pirates! Band of Misfits), Aardman's first 3D stop-motion film and Lord's first film as a director since Chicken Run. Two additional films were announced in June 2007: The Cat Burglars, a stop-motion animated heist comedy film directed by Steve Box, about cat burglars that steal milk and their plans to pull off 'the great milk float robbery'; and an untitled Nick Park project (which would later become Early Man).

On 12 September 2007, Aardman appointed HIT Entertainment to manage licencing and home entertainment distribution for Wallace & Gromit, Shaun the Sheep and Aardman Classics in the US and Canada, which was subsequently extended on 10 June 2008 to include Timmy Time as well as worldwide representation for their themed attraction business.

The studio is also known for providing generous resources and training to young animators, including awards at various animation festivals. For example, the Aardman Award at the UK's Animex Festival in Teesside provides story consultation to a promising young animator for their next film.

In 2008, Aardman collaborated with Channel 4 and Lupus Films to launch a user-generated content animation portal called 4mations. They also designed the BBC One Christmas Idents for that year, which featured Wallace and Gromit to tie in with the showing of the new Wallace and Gromit film called A Matter of Loaf and Death on Christmas Day at 8:30pm. In April 2008, Aardman launched the Aardman YouTube channel, which is a YouTube Partner channel featuring the entire Creature Comforts TV series, the Morph series, Cracking Contraptions and clips from the Wallace and Gromit films. From December 2008, Aardman also started posting various flash games on Newgrounds, the majority of which are based on Wallace and Gromit and Shaun the Sheep.

In 2009, Nintendo announced that Aardman would make twelve short films using only Flipnote Studio. The films were posted on Flipnote's Hatena web service provider. The first film was called The Sandwich Twins and was released on 16 September 2009. The remaining eleven films were released on a weekly basis until Christmas, and can also be downloaded using Hatena. In the same year, the headquarters of the studio moved into a new building, designed by Alec French architects, in Gas Ferry Road, Bristol, although work needing large-scale sets is still carried out in sheds in Aztec West and Bedminster. In April 2009, Aardman Animations edited the existing Watch identity by UKTV to make the inflatable eyeball (called "Blinky") in the idents blink.

=== 2013–2019 ===
In October 2013, Lord (co-founder of Aardman Animations) created a fundraising project on the crowdfunding site Kickstarter. The campaign has a target of £75,000 which would be used to fund 12 new one-minute episodes of Morph. Lord was hoping to start production in January 2014 using the original stop-frame animation. Backers of the project would receive a variety of rewards, including early access to the new animations and a small box of clay used in the production, depending on the individual's level of funding.

In 2015, the studio bought a majority share in New York-based animation studio Nathan Love, announcing the merger with a short film called Introducing: Aardman Nathan Love on 25 September of the same year of that being that the British stop-motion animated series Digby Dragon debuted on Nick Jr. UK in 2016.

In advance of Aardman's 40th anniversary, the BBC One channel aired the one-hour television documentary A Grand Night In: The Story of Aardman, first broadcast in December 2015. Narrated by Julie Walters, this career retrospective includes commentary by the company's founders and staff, as well as various friends, fans and colleagues including Terry Gilliam, John Lasseter, and Matt Groening.

From 29 June 2017 to 29 October 2017, an exhibition entitled "Wallace & Gromit and Friends" was shown at the Australian Centre for the Moving Image (ACMI) in Melbourne. A report on this exhibition was shown on Australian ABC News Breakfast on Wednesday, 28 June, featuring an eight-minute interview with producers Lord and Sproxton. The exhibition revealed that in Park's very early sketches, Gromit was originally a cat, but Park soon changed him into a dog, since it was generally agreed that a dog was clearly more suitable as a loyal pet/companion than a cat and also because a dog would be easier to make and animate in Plasticine. Embedded in the ABC News article is a video interview with Lord and Sproxton, which gives information not only on Wallace and Gromit, but also Shaun the Sheep and others.

On 9 November 2018, Aardman Animations announced that Lord and Sproxton would be transferring majority ownership of the company to its employees in order to keep the studio independent. In January 2019, Lord and Sproxton released a book detailing the history of the studio, called A Grand Success! The Aardman Journey, One Frame at a Time.

=== 2020–present ===
In December 2020, Netflix announced an Aardman Christmas musical special entitled Robin Robin. The 30-minute short, starring Bronte Carmichael, Richard E. Grant, Gillian Anderson and Adeel Akhtar, was released on the platform on 24 November 2021.

On 9 August 2021, it was announced that Gurinder Chadha was directing a musical claymation feature set in India, telling the story of an elephant dreaming about becoming a dancer.

On 30 November 2021, Aardman began producing The Very Small Creatures for Sky Kids and Apple TV.

On 20 January 2022, Netflix announced a sequel to Chicken Run entitled Chicken Run: Dawn of the Nugget. The film, starring Thandiwe Newton and Zachary Levi, premiered on the platform on 15 December 2023. A new Wallace and Gromit film was also confirmed to be 'in the works' for a 2024 release on the BBC in the UK and Netflix for the rest the world. Also in 2022–2023, the 52 episode children's series Lloyd of the Flies, Aardman's first CG production without the involvement of another company, aired on CITV. The series was announced in 2021 and premiered on 20 September 2022.

Aardman is one of the nine studios involved with Lucasfilm's Star Wars: Visions Volume 2, contributing the film "I Am Your Mother".

Newclay Products, the factory that made Lewis Newplast, the modelling clay used by Aardman, shut down in March 2023; Aardman purchased enough remaining clay to cover the 2024 Wallace and Gromit film. The Daily Telegraph initially reported that the studio may not be able to produce new films afterwards due to a lack of clay, but Aardman later released a statement clarifying that it would find a new supplier.

On 1 March 2024, the company announced a number of changes. Emma Hardie was to take up the newly created role of Executive Commercial and Brand Director, and would be responsible for overseeing the financing, distribution, licensing, marketing, and planning of the studio's animated intellectual property. She took up the role, which includes a seat on Aardman's executive board, on April 15. Peter Lord was also stepping down from Aardman's executive board to focus on a slate of individual projects as the Creative Director and would act as an ambassador for the company and British animation. Among the announcements, Sarah Cox and Daniel Efergan were promoted to Chief Creative Director and Executive Creative Director of Interactive & Innovation, respectively.

On 8 March 2024 Aardman and the BBC announced a new collaboration called Things We Love, based on the studio's Creature Comforts films, set to air throughout 2024. Like Creature Comforts, the six, 30-second-long shorts feature animated animals matched to the audio of real, unscripted interviews.

On 6 June 2024, Aardman announced the title of the new Wallace and Gromit feature film as Wallace & Gromit: Vengeance Most Fowl.

On 22 September 2024, Cartoon Network announced on Twitter that they had recruited Aardman to work on an Over the Garden Wall special alongside series creator Patrick McHale to celebrate the miniseries' 10th anniversary, set for release on 3 November 2024. On 21 October 2024, Aardman announced that they would team up with Mattel Television Studios to produce a new Pingu series. Additionally, on 11 December that year, it was announced that Aardman would be collaborating with The Pokémon Company for a project in 2027.

On 7 May 2025, Aardman announced that they were developing a new Shaun the Sheep feature film titled Shaun the Sheep: The Beast of Mossy Bottom, set for release in cinemas and on the Sky Cinema channel in 2026. In July 2025, Aardman and The Pokémon Company jointly announced a new Pokémon television series titled The Misadventures of Sirfetch'd & Pichu.

In 2024, the company made a £4.1 million loss, reduced to a £1.1 million loss in 2025, due to production delays and a difficult children's content market. In 2024, the company produced a five-year business plan with more investment in intellectual property and cost cutting. In 2025, staffing fell from 297 to 230, with permanent staff falling from 128 to 110.

At the 2026 Annecy International Animation Film Festival, Aardman announced two new TV series: Let's Go Timmy! and The Almost (Untold) Story Of Danger Delilah.

== Company name ==
The company name is taken from one of its early characters, a superhero created for Vision On in 1972. Unlike the claymation productions that the company are famous for, Aardman was cel-animated. Peter Lord has stated that the most interesting thing about the company name is that it "means nothing" and is only a joke that two teenagers found funny. He has stated that the name came from a combination of "Aardvark" and "Superman" for the reason that they found aardvark to be a particularly funny word. Aardman Animations became their company name when the BBC asked them to whom they should make their first cheque out. Co-founder David Sproxton has claimed that the name was a result of being unable to "find another word with more A's in it than 'aardvark'" as a schoolboy.

== Non-Aardman productions by Aardman directors ==
A number of Aardman directors have worked at other studios, taking the distinctive Aardman style with them.

Aardman's Steve Box directed the animated music video for the Spice Girls' final single as a five-piece, "Viva Forever". The video took over five months to produce, considerably longer than the group's box office hit movie, Spice World. He is also the co-creator of the Finnish-British animated series Moominvalley, based on the Moomins books.

Barry Purves, director of the Aardman short Next, also directed Hamilton Mattress for Harvest Films. The film, a half-hour special that premiered on Christmas Day 2001, was produced by Chris Moll, producer of the Wallace & Gromit short film The Wrong Trousers. The models were provided by Mackinnon & Saunders, a firm that did the same for Bob the Builder and Corpse Bride.

Similarly, Robbie the Reindeer in Hooves of Fire, a BBC Bristol/Comic Relief production, was directed by Richard Goleszowski, creator of Rex the Runt. Its sequel, Robbie the Reindeer in Legend of the Lost Tribe, was directed by Peter Peake, whose directorial credits for Aardman include Pib and Pog and Humdrum.

Aardman alumni also produced many of the claymation shorts used in the 1986–1990 American television series Pee-wee's Playhouse.

== Films ==
Release timeline
2000	Chicken Run
2001
2002
2003
2004
2005	Wallace & Gromit: The Curse of the Were-Rabbit
2006	Flushed Away
2007
2008
2009
2010
2011	Arthur Christmas
2012	The Pirates! In an Adventure with Scientists!
2013
2014
2015	Shaun the Sheep Movie
2016
2017
2018	Early Man
2019	A Shaun the Sheep Movie: Farmageddon
2020
2021
2022
2023	Chicken Run: Dawn of the Nugget
2024	Wallace & Gromit: Vengeance Most Fowl
2025
2026	Shaun the Sheep: The Beast of Mossy Bottom

Aardman Animations has produced a number of animated features, shorts, videos and TV series, as well as adverts. Their feature films are:

- Chicken Run (2000)
- Wallace & Gromit: The Curse of the Were-Rabbit (2005)
- Flushed Away (2006)
- Arthur Christmas (2011)
- The Pirates! In an Adventure with Scientists! (2012)
- Shaun the Sheep Movie (2015)
- Early Man (2018)
- A Shaun the Sheep Movie: Farmageddon (2019)
- Chicken Run: Dawn of the Nugget (2023)
- Wallace & Gromit: Vengeance Most Fowl (2024)
- Shaun the Sheep: The Beast of Mossy Bottom (2026)

== Divisions ==
=== Aardman Features ===
Aardman Features Limited
- Industry: Film
- Founded: 1999; 27 years ago
- Founder: Peter Lord; Nick Park
- Headquarters: Bristol, United Kingdom
- Parent: Aardman Animations

Aardman Features Limited is a motion picture subsidiary of Aardman Animations. It has produced eleven films so far, three with DreamWorks Animation, two with Sony Pictures Animation, four with StudioCanal, two with Netflix, and one with Sky.

=== Nathan Love ===
Nathan Love LLC
- Formerly: Aardman Nathan Love LLC (2007–2019)
- Industry: Film; Advertising; Television
- Founded: 2007; 19 years ago
- Founder: Joe Burrascano
- Headquarters: Bristol, United Kingdom
- Parent: Aardman Animations
- Website: nathanlove.com

Nathan Love LLC (formerly Aardman Nathan Love LLC from 2007 to 2019) is an American subsidiary of Aardman Animations. Joe Burrascano founded the company in 2007.

== Franchises ==
Title	Release date
Morph	1977–present
Wallace & Gromit/Shaun the Sheep/Timmy Time	1989–present
Chicken Run	2000–present

== Video games ==
Title	Release date	Platform(s)	Developer	Publisher
Chicken Run	2000	PlayStation, Dreamcast, Windows	Blitz Games	Eidos Interactive
Chicken Run	2000	Game Boy Color	Blitz Games	THQ
Wallace & Gromit in Project Zoo	2003	PlayStation 2, Xbox, GameCube, Windows	Frontier Developments	BAM! Entertainment
Rex the Runt: Lost Marbles	2005	Mobile Phone	AirPlay UK	Coyote Wireless
Wallace & Gromit: The Curse of the Were-Rabbit	2005	PlayStation 2, Xbox, Mobile Phone	Frontier Developments	Konami
Wallace & Gromit: The Curse of the Were-Rabbit	2005	Mobile Phone	Frontier Developments	Konami
Flushed Away	2006	PlayStation 2, GameCube	Monkey Bar Games	D3 Publisher
Flushed Away	2006	Game Boy Advance	Altron	D3 Publisher
Flushed Away	2006	DS	Art Co., Ltd	D3 Publisher
Shaun the Sheep	2008	DS	Art Co., Ltd	D3 Publisher
Wallace & Gromit's Grand Adventures	2009	Windows, Xbox 360, iOS	Telltale Games	Telltale Games
Shaun the Sheep: Off His Head	2009	DS	Art Co., Ltd	D3 Publisher
Home Sheep Home	2011	iOS, Flash	Aardman Digital (Browser), Virtual Programming (iOS port)	Aardman Animations (Browser) / Virtual Programming
Home Sheep Home 2	2011	iOS, Flash	Aardman Digital (PC), Mobile Pie., Ltd (iOS port)	Aardman Animations (Browser) / Chillingo
Fleece Lightning	2013	Android, iOS	Aardman Interactive	Aardman Interactive
Shaun the Sheep: Llama League	2015	Android, iOS	Aardman Animations	Aardman Animations
Shaun the Sheep: Shear Speed	2015	Android, iOS	Aardman Animations	Aardman Animations
11-11: Memories Retold	2018	Windows, PlayStation 4, Xbox One	DigixArt and Aardman Animations	Bandai Namco Entertainment
Shaun the Sheep: Home Sheep Home - Farmageddon Party Edition	2019	Windows, Switch, PlayStation 4, Xbox One	Aardman Animations	Aardman Animations
Wallace & Gromit: The Big Fix Up	2021	Android, iOS	Aardman Animations, Tiny Rebel Games, Potato, Sugar Creative	Fictioneers
Wallace & Gromit in The Grand Getaway	2023	Meta Quest 3, Meta Quest Pro, Quest 2	Aardman, Atlas V, No Ghost, Albyon, Reynard Films	Astrea

== Awards and nominations ==
The works of Aardman have received numerous awards and nominations, the major awards won include the Academy Award for Best Animated Feature and BAFTA Award for Best British Film for Wallace & Gromit: The Curse of the Were-Rabbit.

Both Peter Lord and David Sproxton were knighted in Charles III 2026 Birthday Honours "for services to the creative industries and to charity".

== Books ==
- Tristan Davies, Nick Park, Nick Newman (1997); Wallace & Gromit and the Lost Slipper. Adler's Foreign Books. ISBN 978-0-8417-2026-8
- Peter Lord; Brian Sibley (1998). Cracking Animation: The Aardman Book of 3-D Animation. Thames & Hudson Ltd. ISBN 978-0-500-28168-0
- Tristan Davies; Nick Newman (1998). Wallace & Gromit in Anoraknophobia. Adler's Foreign Books. ISBN 978-0-8417-2031-2
- Tristan Davies; Nick Newman (1999). Wallace & Gromit: Crackers in Space. Hodder & Stoughton. ISBN 978-0-340-71289-4
- Andy Lane (2003). Creating Creature Comforts. Boxtree Ltd. ISBN 978-0-7522-1564-8
- Andy Lane (2004). The World of Wallace & Gromit. Boxtree Ltd. ISBN 978-0-7522-1558-7
- Andy Lane; Paul Simpson (2005). The Art of Wallace & Gromit: Curse of the Were-Rabbit. Titan Books Ltd. ISBN 978-1-84576-136-3

== See also ==
- Lists of animated feature films
- List of stop motion films
- Gromit Unleashed
- Laika
