= Dave Alex Riddett =

English cinematographer

Dave Alex Riddett BSC
- Born: 25 November 1954 (age 71); Great Bowden, Leicestershire, England
- Occupation: Cinematographer
- Years active: 1991–present
- Children: 2

David Alexander Riddett (born 25 November 1954) is a prominent English cinematographer mostly known for his work at Aardman Animations.

== Early life and education ==
Riddett was born in Harborough, England. He was brought up in village of Great Bowden. His father, Alec Riddett, was a photographer and artistic manager at Harborough Theatre, hence was Riddett's love for art and cinema. Riddett studied Art in Loughborough College, Communication Design (Film) at Leeds College of Art (Bachelor's Degree) and received Certificate in Radio, Film and Television at University of Bristol.

== Career ==
After finishing University of Bristol Riddett directed some student projects there. Then, in 1983 he and Dave Borthwick opened studio bolexbrothers, producing short films, music promos and TV title sequences. In 1985, still being employed by bolexbrothers, Riddett's talent was noted by Aardman Animations and he joined them as freelance member. Here he notably worked, as Cinematographer, with Nick Park on his acclaimed Creature Comforts short and legendary Wallace & Gromit series, The Wrong Trousers and A Close Shave. Notably, Riddett quit bolexbrothers after 6 years of working here during production of Creature Comforts. During his early years at Aardman Dave also supplied his camera skills for "Sledgehammer" music video.

In 2000, Riddett was Senior Director of photography on the much-acclaimed Chicken Run, Aardman's first feature production, and was nominated at the BAFTA Awards for his work in special visual effects. In 2005 and 2008 Riddett was Director of Photography for Wallace & Gromit's first feature film and for the short Wallace & Gromit: A Matter of Loaf and Death respectively. He was Director of Photography on Wallace and Gromit's World of Invention and Wallace and Gromit's Musical Marvels. In 2015 he was Director of Photography on the Shaun the Sheep Movie. Recent Films include Nick Parks' feature Early Man (2018), Academy Nominated Robin Robin (2021) and in 2024 the Academy Nominated and Double BAFTA winning Wallace and Gromit: Vengeance Most Fowl. Dave Alex was made a full member of the British Society of Cinematographers in 2020.

== Personal ==
Riddett and his wife are living in Bristol, city of Aardman's HQ. They have 2 children, a daughter, Charly and a son, Max.
