= Wallace & Gromit's Grand Adventures =

- Developer: Telltale Games
- Publisher: Telltale Games
- Directors: Andy Hartzell; Joe Pinney; Sean Vanaman
- Producer: Franklin Alioto
- Designers: Joe Pinney; Sean Vanaman; Andy Hartzell
- Programmers: Andrew Langley; Robert Oates
- Artist: Peter Tsaykel
- Writers: Andy Hartzell; Joe Pinney; Sean Vanaman
- Composer: Jared Emerson-Johnson
- Series: Wallace & Gromit
- Engine: Telltale Tool
- Platforms: Microsoft Windows; Xbox 360 iOS (Episode 2 only)
- Release: Episode 1: March 23, 2009 (PC) May 27, 2009 (X360); Episode 2: May 5, 2009 (PC) November 4, 2009 (X360) July 6, 2010 (iOS); Episode 3: June 15, 2009 (PC) November 4, 2009 (X360); Episode 4: July 30, 2009 (PC) November 4, 2009 (X360)
- Genre: Graphic adventure
- Mode: Single-player

Wallace & Gromit's Grand Adventures is an episodic graphic adventure game based around the characters of Wallace & Gromit created by Nick Park and produced by Aardman Animations. The game was developed and published by Telltale Games. It consists of four episodes, which were released to Microsoft Windows from March 23 to July 30, 2009, and to Xbox 360 from May 27 to November 4, 2009.

Episodes are developed by Telltale Games in collaboration with Aardman Animations to develop the story, characters, and setting. Players control both Wallace and Gromit at times through the gameplay. Ben Whitehead, Aardman's official backup voice actor, portrays Wallace, instead of Peter Sallis, who had voiced the character in all screen appearances up to that point. A playable demo of the first episode was made available in March 2009, and can be downloaded from the official site as well as Yahoo Games. It is also included on the Region 2 DVD and Blu-ray releases of A Matter of Loaf and Death as DVD-ROM content. Telltale Games removed the game from sale in January 2014 due to the expiration of their distribution rights for the Wallace & Gromit intellectual property; customers who previously purchased the game were still able to download the episodes from their game library.

The game was relisted on digital storefronts in December 2020, two years after the company closed, along with Strong Bad's Cool Game for Attractive People and Texas Hold'em.

== Synopsis ==
=== Episode 1: Fright of the Bumblebees ===
Wallace and Gromit have opened a new business, "From Bee to You" specialising in delivering freshly made honey to customers. They take up the offer to provide fifty gallons of honey as repair payment to fix local grocer Mr Paneer's shop after Wallace's new prototype robotic cheese-detecting mouse accidentally rampaged through the store on a test run. However, Wallace has used up all the flowers in his garden, and is forced to improvise a growth formula to turn some daisy seeds provided by his neighbour, Ms. Flitt into giant flowers. The formula is a success, and he meets his client's demand but things soon go wrong when the bees react to the growth formula, becoming huge and terrorizing the town and Wallace's home. Gromit is able to trap most of the bees, but Wallace is stolen away by the giant bee queen. Gromit gives chase in Wallace's honey tanker truck, and is able to rescue Wallace. The two work together to feed the queen more honey dosed with more of the growth formula, forcing the bee to become stuck in a tunnel. Wallace works out an antidote to the growth formula to restore the bees to normal, though he accidentally shrinks himself in the process.

=== Episode 2: The Last Resort ===
Wallace prepares to take Gromit to Blackpool, but the weather both spoils their plans and creates a small flood in the cellar. The flood eventually gives Wallace the idea of temporarily converting their cellar into an indoor holiday resort. He and Gromit do it up, scavenging the necessary supplies from town, and he then decides to open it for the rest of the townsfolk. The guests aren't happy at first, due to Ms. Flitt's two puppies, Pudgie-Woo and Tinkie-Wee causing havoc or due to being bullied by Flitt's "boyfriend", Duncan McBiscuit. Wallace manages to satisfy everyone before dinner time and avoids having to give refunds.

At the table during dinner time, the day appears to be a big success until Duncan is almost murdered by only one of the other guests during a blackout. Whilst Wallace attempts unsuccessfully to use his new crime-solving machine, Gromit eventually deduces from evidence and testimony from everyone including a hurt Duncan that Pudgie-Woo and Tinkie-Wee attacked him after he bullied them. When Wallace, Gromit, Pudgie-Woo and Tinkie-Wee fall in the pool, the cellar drain becomes dislodged and the puppies' favourite chew toy goes down the drain. Wallace watches the disheartened Pudgie-Woo and Tinkie-Wee jump down the drain after their toy, with Gromit making it back to shore before Wallace wishes all the appalled guests that they had a good time before their departure. Pudgie-Woo and Tinkie-Wee eventually re-emerge from the drainage system, ending up in the cells at the police station. Despite the mess made, Gromit finally enjoys the resort in private.

That night, a whistling man with a mustache posts a flyer for a charity fair through the door to No. 62 West Wallaby Street.

=== Episode 3: Muzzled! ===
Shortly after the holiday season, a charity fair comes into town, run by Monty Muzzle, to raise money for a new dog shelter, the old one being destroyed in the storm last episode. After dealing with three strays in their home, Wallace and Gromit go to the fair with Wallace's new invention, an ice-cream van that can create any flavour of ice cream. At the fair, Gromit discovers that Mr. Muzzle is actually attempting to steal away the townspeople's donations and using the strays as manual labor for the fair. When Wallace and Gromit uncover Mr. Muzzle's intentions, he escapes on a makeshift balloon, but Wallace and Gromit give chase, denying Mr. Muzzle of his ill-gotten money while saving all the strays. Ms. Flitt, who dumped Duncan McBiscuit earlier in the episode and has grown to admire the "bravery" of Wallace (unaware that it was actually Gromit that stopped Muzzle), mistakes his confusion at finding a loose fastening nut as an engagement ring and a marriage proposal from him.

=== Episode 4: The Bogey Man ===
Wallace and Gromit start a new business called Golden Retrieval which aims to find lost objects and Major Crum hires them. In order to defuse Ms. Flitt's mistake in accepting what she had mistaken as a marriage proposal from Wallace, Gromit manages to make him a member of the local country club, Prickly Thicket, which Ms. Flitt's aunt Prudence loathes and soundly rejects her niece's marriage to Wallace. Ernest Dibbins, the local constable, jealous that Wallace was admitted over him, partly due to the closure of Mr Paneer's shop for public health violations, uses an obscure bylaw to threaten the club with closure since it does not have a golf course–or rather it does, but members do not know where it is because the deed is missing, safely held in a security system designed by Wallace's (apparent) ancestor, Goodman Witless (and his faithful dog Gimlet). Using his detective equipment, Wallace manages to find the deed which Major Crum hired him to do, but discovers that the entire town was built on the golf course, and a vengeful Duncan decides to have the town destroyed in order to rebuild the course. Wallace challenges Duncan to a golf tournament so that he may become chairman and tear up the deed, saving the town, and manages to win with Gromit's help. However, as he goes to tear the deed, the security system traps him and the other townsfolk in a room, and Gromit is forced to disable the trap and free everyone. Wallace tears up the deed, and is thankful to find that Ms. Flitt has cancelled their engagement and gone back to Duncan, who her aunt almost now approves of since he is no longer the club chairman. With a newly opened vacancy, Mr Paneer agrees to nominate Constable Dibbins for membership of the club as part of a quid pro quo for the reopening of his shop.

== Reception ==
Aggregate review scores
Game	GameRankings	Metacritic
Episode 1: Fright of the Bumblebees	(PC) 78% (X360) 75%	(PC) 76 (X360) 73
Episode 2: The Last Resort	(PC) 74% (X360) 72%	(PC) 72 (X360) 73
Episode 3: Muzzled!	(PC) 77% (X360) 75%	(PC) 75 (X360) 72
Episode 4: The Bogey Man	(PC) 74% (X360) 74%	(PC) 72 (X360) 72

=== Episode 1: Fright of the Bumblebees ===
Episode 1: Fright of the Bumblebees received positive reviews. Aggregating review websites GameRankings and Metacritic gave the PC version 78% and 76/100 and the Xbox 360 version 75% and 73/100.

=== Episode 2: The Last Resort ===
Episode 2: The Last Resort received moderately positive reviews. Aggregating review websites GameRankings and Metacritic gave the PC version 74% and 72/100 and the Xbox 360 version 72% and 73/100.

=== Episode 3: Muzzled! ===
Episode 3: Muzzled! received positive reviews. Aggregating review websites GameRankings and Metacritic gave the PC version 77% and 75/100 and the Xbox 360 version 75% and 72/100.

=== Episode 4: The Bogey Man ===
Episode 4: The Bogey Man received mostly positive reviews. Aggregating review websites GameRankings and Metacritic gave the PC version 74% and 72/100 and the Xbox 360 version 74% and 72/100.
