= Jubilee Bunt-a-thon =

- Title screen of Jubilee Bunt-a-thon.
- Written by: Nick Park
- Directed by: Nick Park
- Theme music composer: Julian Nott
- Country of origin: United Kingdom
- Original language: English

Production
- Running time: 1 minute
- Production company: Aardman Animations

Original release
- Release: 2 June 2012

Jubilee Bunt-a-thon is a 2012 animated short film directed by Nick Park, which stars his characters Wallace and Gromit. It was created in association with the National Trust to celebrate the Diamond Jubilee of Queen Elizabeth II.

The film is 1 minute 15 seconds in length and stars Ben Whitehead as Wallace.

== Plot ==
Jubilee Bunt-a-thon follows Wallace and Gromit as they prepare for the Jubilee weekend, hoisting up bunting around Trust manor.

== Production and release ==
Jubilee Bunt-a-thon was exclusively screened at the Jubilee parties hosted by the National Trust.
