= Ben Whitehead =

British actor

- Born: Cheshire, England
- Occupation: Actor
- Years active: 2003–present
- Known for: Wallace & Gromit (since 2013)
- Height: 6 ft 4 in (1.93 m)
- Website: Official website

Benjamin Whitehead is an English actor. He is the second actor to provide the voice of Wallace in the Wallace & Gromit franchise, replacing Peter Sallis following his retirement in 2010.

== Early life ==
Benjamin Whitehead was born in Cheshire, England. His parents, both avid art enthusiasts, encouraged his passion for acting and storytelling from a young age.

== Career ==
Whitehead began working on films with Aardman Animations in 2003. In 2009, he became the second person to play Wallace, beside Peter Sallis, starting in Wallace & Gromit's Grand Adventures, a four-part episodic adventure game by Telltale Games. Following Peter Sallis' last work as Wallace in 2010, Whitehead became the official voice of the character beginning with Wallace & Gromit's Musical Marvels, Prom 20 of the 2012 season of the BBC Proms. Outside of acting, Whitehead was Aardman's read-in artist for A Matter of Loaf and Death, and was also the read-in artist for the 2014 animated film The Boxtrolls.

Whitehead has performed in Great Scott!, an Antarctic epic touring comedy from Gonzo Moose. He performed a one-man show at The London Horror Festival and voiced the title role in Golem (Young Vic and tour), produced by multi award-winning theatre company 1927, directed by Suzanne Andrade and Paul Barritt.

Whitehead voiced Wallace in the second Wallace & Gromit feature film, Wallace & Gromit: Vengeance Most Fowl in 2024. He voiced Keir Starmer and Howard Lutnick in the BBC Radio comedy-drama play Churchill's Bust in 2025.

== Filmography ==
=== Film ===
Year	Title	Role	Notes
2005	Wallace & Gromit: The Curse of the Were-Rabbit	Mr. Leaching (voice)	
2008	A Matter of Loaf and Death	Baker Bob (voice)	Short
2012	The Pirates! In an Adventure with Scientists!	The Pirate Who Likes Sunsets and Kittens (voice)	United Kingdom version
2012	So You Want to Be a Pirate!	Announcer (voice)	Short film
2013	Secrets of the Dark House	Husband	Short film
2015	A Grand Night In: The Story of Aardman	Wallace (Voice)	
2018	Early Man	Additional voices	
2021	Views of the Shard	John	Short film
2023	Eigengrau Half-Life	Michael Hobbs	Short film
2024	Wallace & Gromit: Vengeance Most Fowl	Wallace (voice)	

=== Television ===
Year	Title	Role	Notes
2011	Fred Strangebone's World of Murder, Mystery and Murder	Fred Strangebone	1 episode
2012	BBC Proms	Wallace (voice)	1 episode
2019	Berry Bees	Additional voices	26 episodes
2024	Strictly Come Dancing	Wallace (voice)	1 episode
2025	News Breakfast	Self - Actor/Wallace & Gromit: Vengeance Most Fowl	(Archive Footage), (Uncredited) 1 episode

=== Commercials ===
Year	Title	Role	Notes
2008	BBC One Wallace & Gromit's Runaway Sled	Wallace (voice)	Partially voiced by Peter Sallis
2009	Wallace & Gromit Present "A World of Cracking Ideas" Commercial	Wallace (voice)	
2012	National Trust Jubilee Bunt-a-thon	Wallace (voice)	
2012	Google Google+ Hangout	Wallace (voice)	
2013	Your Great Adventure Wallace & Gromit's Great UK Adventure	Wallace (voice)	
2018	We Are Most Amused and Amazed Commercial	Wallace (voice)	
2019	Joules Christmas at a Click of a Button	Wallace (voice)	
2019	DFS The Great Sofa Caper	Wallace (voice)	
2020	DFS A Comfy Carol	Wallace (voice)	
2020	DFS Grand Comfort Sale Commercial	Wallace (voice)	
2024	TKMaxx Comic Relief - Red Nose Day	Wallace (voice)	
2024	BBC One Christmas Jumpers	Wallace (voice)	
2025	Barbour Wallace & Gromit x Barbour	Wallace (voice)	

=== Video games ===
Year	Title	Role
2005	Wallace & Gromit: The Curse of the Were-Rabbit	Mr. Leaching, Hutch
2009	Wallace & Gromit's Grand Adventures	Wallace
2015	Anno 2205	John Rafferty
2016	Shadow Tactics: Blades of the Shogun	Male Civilian, Officer
2017	The Pillars of the Earth	Remigius, Civilians
2019	Layers of Fear 2	Journalist
2019	Trine 4: The Nightmare Prince	Sir Florianus
2019	A Year of Rain	Additional voices
2020	Total War Saga: Troy	Additional voices
2020	Wallace & Gromit: The Big Fix Up	Wallace
2021	Sherlock Holmes: Chapter One	Additional voices
2023	Wallace & Gromit in The Grand Getaway	Wallace

=== Web ===
Year	Title	Role	Notes
2020	Down	Therapist, Boss	1 episode

=== Music videos ===
Year	Title	Role	Notes
2013	Life Goes On	Surgeon	

== Theatre ==
- 2012 Wallace & Gromit's Musical Marvels, Wallace (voice)
