= Wallace & Gromit's Musical Marvels =

- Logo
- Written by: Richard Hansom; Nick Park; Merlin Crossingham
- Directed by: Helen Mansfield (for BBC live broadcast)
- Creative director: Merlin Crossingham
- Starring: Nicholas Collon; Tasmin Little; Ben Whitehead
- Composers: Iain Farrington; Julian Nott
- Country of origin: United Kingdom
- Original language: English

Production
- Producers: Jane Carter; Helen Mansfield; Helen Argo
- Editor: Oliver MacFarlane
- Production company: Aardman Animations

Original release
- Network: BBC One
- Release: 27 August 2012

Wallace & Gromit's Musical Marvels (also known as Wallace & Gromit at the Proms) is the name of Prom 20 of the 2012 season of The BBC Proms. It features orchestral renditions of music featured in the Wallace & Gromit series of films. Ben Whitehead reprises his role as Wallace. Due to its popularity, it became a full touring show in 2013, premiering at The Plenary in Melbourne, Australia on 9 February 2013.

== Plot ==
Musical Marvels features new animated footage of Wallace and Gromit that are shown between the orchestral pieces. The animated scenes are made to interact with the conductor on stage through an invention called a Maestromatic. This is a conductor's stand with a plate of cheese and crackers and a chute which receives letters and compositions from Wallace, who is said to be below the concert hall. A new musical composition by Wallace is slated to be played by the end of the night, called "My Concerto in Ee, Lad". Wallace invents a mechanized petrol powered piano called the pianomatic to play the tune, but the invention backfires on itself and the piano, along with his concerto, is destroyed. Gromit ends up saving the night by composing his own musical piece, "A Double Concerto for Violin and Dog", which he plays on a priceless Stradivarius violin found below the concert hall over the monitor with English classical violinist Tasmin Little. In the end, Wallace congratulates Gromit for a job well done, gives him a bouquet of flowers from a mechanized flower dispenser, and sits down on the Stradivarius violin.

=== Program ===
- Csárdás by Vittorio Monti - with Tasmin Little
- The Infernal Dance of King Katschei from the Firebird Suite by Igor Stravinsky - set to a montage of W&G villains Feathers McGraw, Preston, Victor and Piella Bakewell
- Clair de Lune by Claude Debussy - set to a montage featuring Wendolene, Lady Tottington and Piella
- Overture of The Magic Flute by Amadeus Wolfgang Mozart
- Fugue from 1st Movement of Symphony No. 4 by Dmitri Shostakovich - set to a variety of chase scenes from all 5 W&G adventures and 2 television series
- Wing It by Iain Farrington (features samples of the "Wallace & Gromit Theme" as well as I Got Rhythm by George Gershwin)
- Romance by Iain Farrington (identified in-story as Gromit's Double Concerto for Violin and Dog)

== Cast ==
- Ben Whitehead as Wallace
- Nicholas Collon as himself
- Tasmin Little as herself
- Thomas Gould as himself

== Production and release ==
Musical Marvels was performed live at the Royal Albert Hall on 29 July 2012. It featured the Aurora Orchestra conducted by Nicholas Collon who also narrated and 'communicated' with Wallace. It was broadcast live on BBC Radio, and then a later video broadcast was made on BBC One on 27 August.

Due to its popularity, it became a full touring show in 2013. It premiered at The Plenary in Melbourne, Australia on 9 February 2013. It was performed at other venues throughout 2013 including the Sydney Opera House, with the animated short film A Matter of Loaf and Death screened at each performance.

After falling into relative obscurity, the television version was rebroadcast on BBC Four on 22 December 2024, days before Wallace & Gromit: Vengeance Most Fowl premiered on BBC One.
