= Shaun the Sheep: The Beast of Mossy Bottom =

2026 British film

- Theatrical release poster
- Directed by: Steve Cox; Matthew Walker
- Written by: Mark Burton; Giles Pilbrow
- Based on: Shaun the Sheep by: Nick Park; Bob Baker
- Produced by: Richard Beek; Mark Burton
- Starring: Justin Fletcher; John Sparkes; Nina Sosanya
- Cinematography: Charles Copping
- Edited by: Dan Hembery
- Music by: Natalie Holt
- Production company: Aardman Animations
- Distributed by: Sky UK; StudioCanal
- Release date: 18 September 2026
- Running time: 81 minutes
- Country: United Kingdom
- Language: English
- Box office: $25.4 million

Shaun the Sheep: The Beast of Mossy Bottom is a 2026 British stop-motion animated comedy horror film directed by Steve Cox and Matthew Walker and written by Mark Burton and Giles Pilbrow. Produced by Aardman, it is the third feature film based on the British television series Shaun the Sheep, which itself is a spin-off of the Wallace & Gromit short film A Close Shave (1995). The film takes place around Halloween and follows Shaun as he aims to save his flock's farmer after a mad science experiment goes wrong.

Shaun the Sheep: The Beast of Mossy Bottom was released on 18 September 2026 by Sky UK in the United Kingdom and Ireland. The film has received acclaim from critics and grossed $21.8 million.

== Plot ==
During the lead-up to Halloween on the Mossy Bottom farm, the farmer accidentally destroys his sheep flock's secret pumpkin patch. Shaun discovers a book on home-made science and becomes a mad scientist to fix the problem. He creates a potion to regrow the pumpkins instantly, but the container is misplaced and Shaun mistakenly mixes the potion with the farmer's bottle of hair-growth serum. After Shaun plants the first seed, the farmer's dog Bitzer obliviously returns the bottle. The farmer applies it to his head, hoping to impress the town vet, with whom he has a mutual crush. The mixed potion causes the farmer's hair to grow wildly out of control, turning him into a shaggy beast resembling Bigfoot. The farm animals are frightened by the farmer's appearance, mistaking him for a beast. While hiding from him in his house, the sheep realise the beast is the farmer. The farmer fails to stop the hair from growing and retreats to a cave. Bitzer tracks him down, unaware of his transformation. The farmer goes after Bitzer, who flees in terror thinking the beast ate the farmer; he tries to escape in the farmer's pickup truck which the farmer and the sheep end up on. Bitzer loses the farmer upon reaching the town, where Shaun explains the situation to him.

While stumbling through the Mossingham town, the farmer inadvertently scares the townspeople. The vet aspires to capture the beast with the hope of sending him to Bigfoot Island, also unaware it is the farmer. Despite extreme backlash from the townspeople, she tranquillises the farmer and has him shipped to Bigfoot Island. Bitzer and the sheep steal a crate from a ship presumably carrying the farmer, but they find it is full of stuffed toys and the farmer is still en route to the island.

The farm animals return home dismayed and Shaun gives up his mad scientist persona, feeling guilty for his actions. Upon finding several missed calls from the vet on the farmer's phone, Shaun enlists her help. Through DNA testing, she discovers the farmer is the beast. Shaun and the vet chase after the ship on a motorboat and rescue the farmer. He and the flock race to make an antidote for the growth potion as the farm's pumpkins begin to grow uncontrollably. Back at the farm, the locals rally against the "beast" and chase him to the windmill where Shaun created the potion. Using an overgrown carved pumpkin and a tractor, Bitzer and Timmy create the illusion that the beast has been eaten. Shaun sprays the antidote into the mouth of the carved pumpkin, returning the farmer to normal. The farmer and the vet invite each other to a local Halloween dance party, while the flock holds a secret Halloween party of their own. Meanwhile, a crow drinks the remnants of the growth potion out of a bin.

== Voice cast ==
- Justin Fletcher as Shaun and Timmy
- John Sparkes as Bitzer and the farmer
- Nina Sosanya as the vet
- Kate Harbour as Timmy's mum
- Richard Webber as Shirley
- Emma Tate as Hazel
- Simon Greenall as the twins
- Andy Nyman as Nuts
- Paul Whitehouse as the shopkeeper
- Dani Dyer as the influencer
- Chris Morrell as the captain and Nuts (Note: It is unclear where Morrell voices Nuts, although he is credited as the character, together with Nyman.)
- Roman Kemp as the pizza delivery boy

== Production ==
The Beast of Mossy Bottom was announced in May 2025, with the cast being announced in March 2026. The same month, it was announced that Natalie Holt would compose the score, marking her debut in scoring an animated film. Production was completed around 19 August 2026.

== Release ==
Shaun the Sheep: The Beast of Mossy Bottom was released on 18 September 2026. It was distributed by Sky UK under the Sky Original banner in the United Kingdom and Ireland, by GKIDS in North America with StudioCanal handling international sales.

== Reception ==
=== Box office ===
As of 5 October 2026, Shaun the Sheep: The Beast of Mossy Bottom has grossed $3.1 million in the United States and Canada, and $22.3 million in other territories (including $7.7 million in the United Kingdom), for a worldwide total of $25.4 million worldwide.

In the United States and Canada, the film was released alongside Resident Evil and The Weight, and made $1.8 million on its opening weekend.

=== Critical reception ===
On the review aggregator website Rotten Tomatoes, 99% of 89 critics' reviews are positive, with an average rating of 7.8/10. The website's consensus reads: "Shaun the Sheep: The Beast of Mossy Bottom combines snappy visual comedy and Aardman's endearingly handmade aesthetic to craft a charming, deceptively funny monster movie pastiche." Metacritic, which uses a weighted average, assigned the film a score of 80 out of 100, based on 18 critics, indicating "generally favorable" reviews.

In a positive review, Frank Scheck of The Hollywood Reporter wrote, "[U]nlike the frenetic, in-your-face style of so many American animated films, the charmingly low-key Shaun the Sheep: The Beast of Mossy Bottom always feels understated, as if slightly embarrassed when the humor becomes lowbrow." Peter Bradshaw of The Guardian gave the film four out of five stars, writing, "As ever with Shaun the Sheep and Aardman Animations generally, the standard of writing is extremely high and the script here, from Mark Burton and Giles Pilbrow, sparkles with good-natured fun." John Nugent of Empire also gave the film four out of five stars and wrote that "Aardman's stop-motion care and craft remains as sharp as ever."

=== Accolades ===
Award	Date of ceremony	Category	Nominee(s)	Result	Ref.
British Independent Film Awards	6 December 2026	Best Effects	Jon Biggins, Jeff Dillon	Pending	

== See also ==
- List of films set around Halloween
