= Shaun the Sheep: The Farmer's Llamas =

2015 TV special directed by Jay Grace

- DVD cover
- Genre: Adventure; Comedy
- Created by: Richard Starzak
- Based on: Shaun the Sheep and Wallace and Gromit created by: Nick Park; Bob Baker
- Written by: Nick Vincent Murphy; Lee Pressman; Richard Starzak
- Directed by: Jay Grace
- Starring: Justin Fletcher; John Sparkes; Sean Connolly; Chris Grimes
- Composer: Mark Thomas
- Country of origin: United Kingdom

Production
- Executive producers: Peter Lord; Nick Park; David Sproxton; Alix Wiseman
- Producers: Paul Kewley; John Woolley
- Editor: Dan Williamson
- Running time: 28 minutes
- Production companies: Aardman Animations; Bardel Entertainment

Original release
- Network: BBC One
- Release: 26 December 2015

Related
- Shaun the Sheep; Shaun the Sheep Movie; A Shaun the Sheep Movie: Farmageddon

Shaun the Sheep: The Farmer's Llamas is a British animated television special based on the television programme Shaun the Sheep by Nick Park. Produced by Paul Kewley and John Woolley and directed by Jay Grace, the programme made its debut on Amazon Video in the United States on November 13, 2015 and on BBC One in the United Kingdom on December 26, 2015, Boxing Day. The special follows Shaun the Sheep (Justin Fletcher) as he gets the Farmer (John Sparkes) to bring home three Llamas from the County Fair. Like the television series Shaun the Sheep, there is no significant dialogue, as the majority of the screenplay takes place through visual implications or implied dialogue.

== Plot ==
When the Farmer and Bitzer take a cake to a contest at a festival, Shaun tries to steal it but ends up hiding in the Farmer's jacket. At the festival, he encounters three llamas named Hector, Raul and Fernando, who are hypnotized by a flutist. The flute player stumbles and awakens the llamas, who create chaos in the cake contest. Once the llamas are again hypnotized, they are taken to an auction and sold. Thanks to Shaun, the Farmer and Bitzer accidentally buy them.

Back at Mossy Bottom Farm, the Farmer leads the llamas to the sheep meadow. Shaun befriends the llamas and he and the flock play a football game against them. Timmy finds the flute that came with the llamas and tests it, discovering that he can hypnotize them. However, Timmy loses the flute and the llamas destroy it. The llamas go on a vandalizing spree, culminating in taking a quad bike and destroying the sheep house just as Bitzer finishes repairing it and Hector betrays Shaun. The flock becomes angry with Shaun. Meanwhile, the Farmer and Bitzer discover that the llamas have taken over the Farmer's house. After a confrontation, the llamas lock the Farmer in a wardrobe.

Bitzer and Shaun devise a plan to get rid of the llamas, tricking the creatures into the caravan. The plan fails and the llamas escape to take revenge on Shaun. He climbs on the roof of the Farmer's house where the three corner him. However, Timmy and the flock, with Bitzer's help, musically play empty bottles to hypnotize the llamas, who fall back into the caravan.

Bitzer frees the Farmer from the wardrobe, and the next day the llamas are taken back to the auction, where the Farmer inadvertently buys a rhinoceros. In the end credits, the Farmer and Bitzer have just finished rebuilding the sheep barn and the pigsty fence the llamas have broken, the llamas' buyer gives them to his daughter where she treats them badly, much to their annoyance, and the rhino came to the farm with the Farmer and Bitzer hiding, and the flock playing with the rhino.

== Cast ==
- Justin Fletcher as Shaun the Sheep and Timmy
- John Sparkes as Bitzer and the Farmer
- Kate Harbour as Timmy's Mum
- Simon Greenall as the Twins and the Naughty Pigs
- Andy Nyman as Nuts
- Emma Tate as Hazel
- Richard Webber as Shirley
- Sean Connolly as Hector
- Chris Grimes as Fernando and Raul

Additional voices

- Dan Williamson

== Production ==
The special was first announced on 13 October 2014 and aired on BBC One on 26 December 2015, Boxing Day. It first went into production after production was completed on Shaun the Sheep Movie.

== Release ==
The special was released on Amazon Prime Video in the USA on 13 November 2015. It aired in the UK on BBC One on Boxing Day 2015 at 6.10pm. It was released on DVD in the UK by StudioCanal on 8 February 2016. It was also released on DVD in Australia on 2 March 2016 by ABC DVD.

== Reception and ratings ==
The special was watched by 6.04 million viewers on BBC One. Melissa Camacho from Common Sense Media gave it four out of five and said "Shaun fans of all ages should find this adventure a delightful addition to the Aardman canon." Ed Power from The Daily Telegraph gave it four out of five and said "Kids, of course, will have loved every silly, sloppy minute. For a show going out at tea-time on Boxing Day, surely that was mission accomplished." Ed Liu from Toon Zone said "The show certainly held my interest and extracted more than its share of laughs, but The Farmer's Llamas doesn't really have much more plot than an average episode of Shaun the Sheep."

In 2016, it was nominated for an International Emmy Award for Kids: Animation.

=== Accolades ===
Award	Date of ceremony	Category	Nominees	Result
International Emmy Awards	21 November 2016	Kids: Animation	Jay Grace	Won
British Academy Children's Awards	20 November 2016	Animation in 2016	Shaun the Sheep: The Farmer's Llamas	Nominated
Kidscreen Awards 2017	15 February 2017	Best in Class	Shaun the Sheep: The Farmer's Llamas	Won
