= Wallace & Gromit in The Grand Getaway =

- Developers: Aardman Animations; Atlas V No Ghost; Albyon; Reynard Films
- Publisher: Astrea
- Platforms: Quest 2 Meta Quest 3 Meta Quest Pro; Steam; PlayStation VR2
- Release: December 7, 2023 (Quest)
- Genre: Adventure
- Mode: Single-player

Wallace & Gromit in The Grand Getaway is a video game developed by Aardman Animations in collaboration with Atlas V, No Ghost, Albyon and Reynard Films and published by Astrea. It was released worldwide for the Meta Quest on 7 December 2023. The game is based on the Wallace & Gromit series.

A version of the game for Steam and PlayStation VR2 has been announced and will be releasing soon.

== Gameplay ==
The game features a series of mini games, centred around Wallace (voiced by Ben Whitehead) and his dog Gromit preparing for a golfing getaway.

== Reception ==
Wallace & Gromit and The Grand Getaway received "average" reviews according to the review aggregation website Metacritic.
