= Nick Park =

British filmmaker (born 1958)

Nick Park CBE RDI
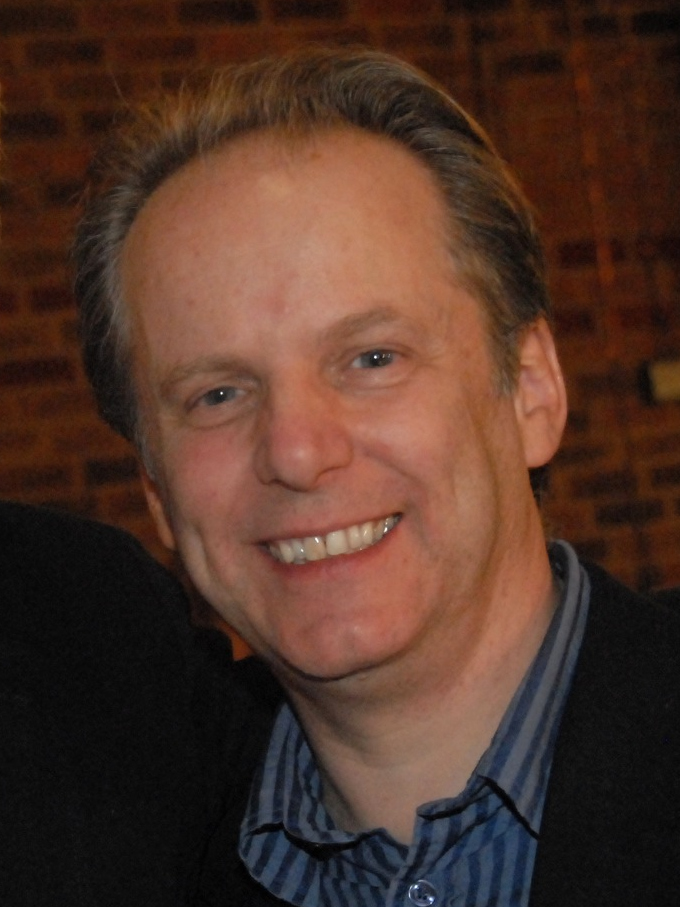
- Nick Park in 2007
- Born: Nicholas Wulstan Park; 6 December 1958 (age 67); Preston, Lancashire, England
- Education: The National Film and Television School
- Occupations: Filmmaker; animator; voice actor
- Years active: 1985–present
- Works: Wallace & Gromit; Creature Comforts; Chicken Run; Shaun the Sheep; Early Man
- Spouse: Mags Connolly (m. 2016)
- Awards: Four Academy Awards (1989, 1993, 1995, 2005)
- Nick Park's voice from the BBC programme Desert Island Discs, 19 December 2010.

Nicholas Wulstan Park (born 6 December 1958) is a British filmmaker, animator, and voice actor who created Wallace & Gromit, Creature Comforts, Chicken Run, and Shaun the Sheep. Park has been nominated for an Academy Award seven times and won four with Creature Comforts (1989), The Wrong Trousers (1993), A Close Shave (1995) and Wallace & Gromit: The Curse of the Were-Rabbit (2005). He also was the co-director, co-producer, and storyboard artist of Early Man (2018) and provided vocal sound effects for Hognob, a dog-like warthog who has dog behaviors, also Dug's pet warthog.

He has also received seven BAFTA Awards, including the BAFTA for Best Short Animation for A Matter of Loaf and Death, which was believed to be the most-watched television programme in the United Kingdom in 2008. His 2000 film Chicken Run is the highest-grossing stop motion animated film.

In 1985 Park joined Aardman Animations, based in Bristol, and for his work in animation he was among the British cultural icons selected by artist Peter Blake to appear in a 2012 version of Blake's most famous artwork - the Beatles' Sgt. Pepper's Lonely Hearts Club Band album cover - to celebrate the British cultural figures of his life.

Park was appointed a CBE by Queen Elizabeth II in the 1997 Birthday Honours for "services to the animated film industry".

== Early life and education ==
Nicholas Wulstan Park was born on 6 December 1958 in Preston, Lancashire, to seamstress Mary Cecilia (née Ashton; 1930-2020) and Roger Wulstan Park (1925–2004), an architectural photographer. The middle child of five siblings, he grew up in Penwortham; the family later moved to Walmer Bridge. His sister Janet lives in Longton, Lancashire. He attended Cuthbert Mayne High School (now Our Lady's Catholic High School).

Park grew up with a keen interest in drawing cartoons, and as a 13-year-old, he made films with the help of his mother, her home film camera and cotton bobbins. He also took after his father, an amateur inventor, and would submit to Blue Peter homemade items such as a bottle that squeezed out different coloured wools.

He studied Communication Arts at Sheffield City Polytechnic (now Sheffield Hallam University) and then went to the National Film and Television School, where he started making the first Wallace and Gromit film, A Grand Day Out.

== Career ==
In 1985, Park joined the staff of Aardman Animations in Bristol, where he worked as an animator on commercial products (including the dance scene involving oven-ready chickens for the music video for Peter Gabriel's "Sledgehammer"). He also had a part in animating the Penny cartoons from the first season of Pee-wee's Playhouse, which featured Paul Reubens as his character Pee-wee Herman.

Along with all this, he had finally completed A Grand Day Out, and with that in post-production, he made Creature Comforts as his contribution to a series of shorts called "Lip Synch". Creature Comforts matched animated zoo animals with a soundtrack of people talking about their homes. The two films were nominated for a host of awards. A Grand Day Out won the first BAFTA Award, and Creature Comforts won his first Academy Award.

In 1990, Park worked alongside advertising agency GGK to develop a series of highly acclaimed television advertisements for the "Heat Electric" campaign. The Creature Comforts advertisements are now regarded as among the best advertisements ever shown on British television, as voted (independently) by viewers of the United Kingdom's main commercial channels ITV and Channel 4.

Two more Wallace and Gromit shorts, The Wrong Trousers (1993) and A Close Shave (1995), followed, both winning Academy Awards. He then made his first feature-length film, Chicken Run (2000), co-directed with Aardman founder Peter Lord. He also supervised a new series of Creature Comforts films for British television in 2003.

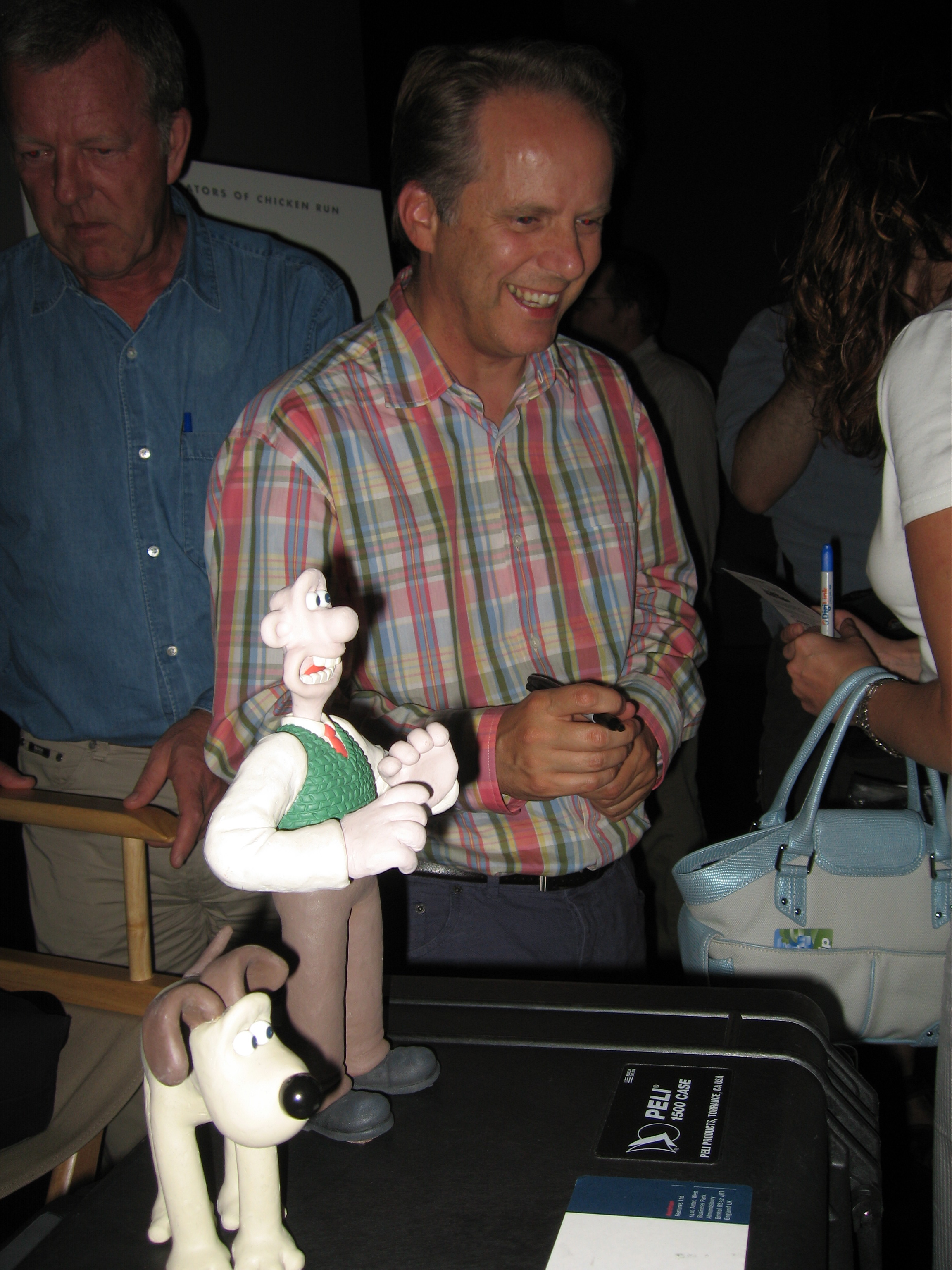
Park in 2005 promoting Wallace & Gromit: The Curse of the Were-Rabbit

His second theatrical feature-length film and first Wallace and Gromit feature, Wallace & Gromit: The Curse of the Were-Rabbit, was released on 5 October 2005, and on 6 March 2006 it won the Academy Award for Best Animated Feature at the 78th Academy Awards.

On 10 October 2005, a fire gutted one of Aardman Animations' archive warehouses. The fire resulted in the loss of some of Park's creations, including the models and sets used in the movie Chicken Run. Some of the original Wallace and Gromit models and sets, as well as the master prints of the finished films, were elsewhere and survived.

In 2007 and 2008, Park's work included a United States version of Creature Comforts, a weekly television series that was on CBS every Monday evening at 8 pm ET. In the series, Americans were interviewed about a range of subjects. The interviews were lip-synced to Aardman animal characters.

In September 2007, it was announced that Park had been commissioned to design a bronze statue of Wallace and Gromit, which will be placed in his hometown of Preston. In October 2007, it was announced that the BBC had commissioned another Wallace and Gromit short film to be entitled Trouble at Mill (retitled later to A Matter of Loaf and Death).

Park studied at Preston College, which has since named its library for the art and design department after him: the Nick Park Library Learning Centre. He is the recipient of a gold Blue Peter badge.

By the beginning of 2010, Park had won four Academy Awards, and had the distinction of having won an Academy Award every time he had been nominated (his only loss being when he was nominated twice in the same category). This streak ended in the 2010 Oscars when A Matter of Loaf and Death failed to win the best animated short Academy Award.

Park had his first acting role in February 2011, voicing himself in a cameo on The Simpsons episode "Angry Dad: The Movie". In the episode, the fictional Park's new Willis and Crumble short, Better Gnomes and Gardens, is a parody of Wallace and Gromit.

In the end of 2011, Park directed a music video for "Plain Song"—a song by Native and the Name, a Sheffield band led by Joe Rose, the son of an old university friend. The video was filmed at Birkdale School, Sheffield, and Park also selected the track as one of his Desert Island Discs when he went on the show in 2011, which led to suggestions that Park was using his fame to give a friend a leg up in his career. Park denied these claims, insisting it had become one of his favourite songs. The song and video can be found on YouTube.

In April 2013, Park was involved in the British stage adaptation of Hayao Miyazaki's animated film, Princess Mononoke. He was the executive producer of Shaun the Sheep Movie and he also voiced himself in a cameo.

For 2018, he directed another Aardman Animations stop-motion film, titled Early Man, which tells a story of a caveman who unites his tribe against the Bronze Age while unintentionally inventing football.

On 21 May 2019, Park announced that a new Wallace and Gromit project was currently in the works, with no projected release date. In January 2022, Park announced that the project was currently in production as a television film for release in 2024 for the BBC and Netflix. The film, Wallace & Gromit: Vengeance Most Fowl, was first shown on BBC One on Christmas Day 2024, and also featured the return of Wrong Trousers villain Feathers McGraw.

== Personal life ==
The Daily Telegraph remarked Park has taken on some attributes of Wallace, just "as dog owners come to look like their pets", overexpressing himself, possibly as a result of having to show animators how he wants his characters to behave.

Park married Mags Connolly at the Gibbon Bridge Hotel near Chipping on 16 September 2016. Although by his own admission, he was not especially interested in football growing up, he has always nominally supported his hometown's local team, Preston North End.

== Influences ==
Nick Park has stated that his main influences have been Ray Harryhausen, Oliver Postgate, Peter Firmin, Chuck Jones, Hayao Miyazaki, Yuri Norstein, Richard Williams, Terry Gilliam, and Bob Godfrey. He was inspired by Gilliam's animation in Monty Python "to be a bit wacky and off the wall." He is a fan of Gerry Anderson, known for "Supermarionation" as seen in Thunderbirds.

He is a fan of The Beano comic, and guest-edited the 70th-anniversary issue dated 2 August 2008. He stated, "My dream job was always to work on The Beano and it's such an honour for me to be Guest Editor." He also contributed to Classics from the Comics at the same time, picking his favourite classic stories for the comic reprint magazine's new Classic Choice feature.

His film-making ideas were encouraged by his old English teacher; however, Park has denied that the character of Wallace was based on him.

== Works ==
=== Feature films ===
Year	Title	Director	Producer	Writer	Voice actor	Notes
2000	Chicken Run	Yes	Yes	Story	No	Co-directed with Peter Lord
2005	Wallace & Gromit: The Curse of the Were-Rabbit	Yes	Yes	Yes	No	Co-directed with Steve Box
2015	Shaun the Sheep Movie	No	Executive	No	Yes	Voice cameo appearance; characters
2018	Early Man	Yes	Yes	Story	Yes	As role Hognob
2019	A Shaun the Sheep Movie: Farmageddon	No	Executive	No	No	Characters
2023	Chicken Run: Dawn of the Nugget	No	Executive	No	No	Characters
2024	Wallace & Gromit: Vengeance Most Fowl	Yes	Executive	Story	No	Co-directed with Merlin Crossingham
2026	Shaun the Sheep: The Beast of Mossy Bottom	No	Executive	No	No	Characters

=== Short films ===
Year	Title	Director	Writer	Animator	Executive producer	Notes
1985	Second Class Mail	No	No	Color	No	
1986	Babylon	No	No	Yes	No	
1989	War Story	No	No	Yes	No	Documentary
1989	Creature Comforts	Yes	Yes	Yes	No	
1989	Wallace & Gromit: A Grand Day Out	Yes	Yes	Yes	No	Also cinematographer
1993	Wallace & Gromit: The Wrong Trousers	Yes	Yes	Yes	No	
1995	Wallace & Gromit: A Close Shave	Yes	Yes	Character	No	
1997	Stage Fright	No	No	No	Yes	
2008	Wallace & Gromit: A Matter of Loaf and Death	Yes	Yes	No	No	
2012	Wallace & Gromit: Jubilee Bunt-a-thon	Yes	Yes	No	No	

=== Television and web series ===
Year	Title	Creator	Producer	Writer	Animator	Voice actor	Notes
1986	Pee-wee's Playhouse	No	No	No	Yes	No	Animator for Penny cartoons
2002	Wallace & Gromit's Cracking Contraptions	Developer	Yes	No	No	No	
2003–2006	Creature Comforts	Yes	Executive	No	No	No	
2007–present	Shaun the Sheep	Idea	Executive	Yes	No	No	Including 3D, Championsheeps & The Farmer's Llamas
2009–2012	Timmy Time	No	Executive	No	No	No	
2010	Wallace & Gromit's World of Invention	Yes	Executive	No	No	No	
2011	The Simpsons	No	No	No	No	Yes	Voice cameo in "Angry Dad: The Movie"
2012	The BBC Proms	No	No	Yes	No	No	''Prom 20: Wallace & Gromit's Musical Marvels''

=== Music videos ===
Year	Performer	Song	Animator
1986	Peter Gabriel	"Sledgehammer"	Yes
1996	Tina Turner & Barry White	"In Your Wildest Dreams"	Yes

=== Commercials ===
- Burger King commercials
- The Electricity Association

=== Video games ===
- Wallace & Gromit Fun Pack (1996)
- Wallace & Gromit Fun Pack 2 (1999)

=== Book ===
- Grand: The Autobiography of Gromit ("as told to Nick Park")

- Hardback, 22nd October 2026, Ebury Spotlight, ISBN 9781529990874
- Paperback, 20th May 2027, Ebury Spotlight, ISBN 9781529990881

== Accolades and honours ==
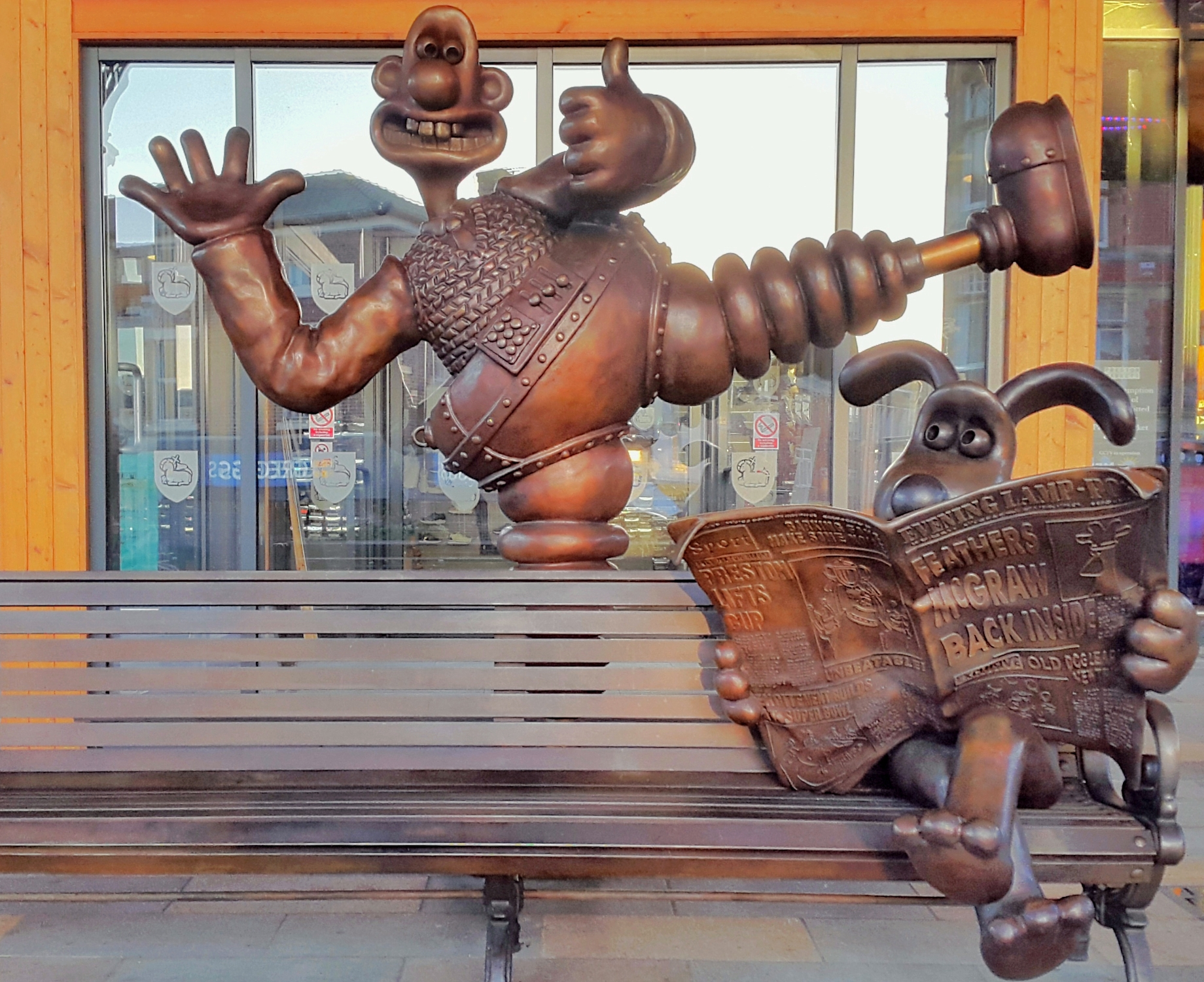
Wallace & Gromit bronze sculpture in Preston, Lancashire.

In 1996, he received an honorary doctorate from the University of Bath.

On 25 October 1997, Park was awarded the Honorary Freedom of Preston, his home town (now city), which is the highest award a Council can bestow on an individual.

In 2016, and following a vote by students on a number of nominated 'Preston Legends', the University of Central Lancashire named one of three new meeting rooms in the students' union after Park, who was born in the city where it is based. In response, Park sent the university a message to say how honoured he was by it.

Year	Nominated for	Award	Category	Result
1990	Creature Comforts	BAFTA Awards	Best Short Animation	Nominated
1990	A Grand Day Out	BAFTA Awards	Best Short Animation	Won
1991	Creature Comforts	Academy Awards	Best Animated Short Film	Won
1991	A Grand Day Out	Academy Awards	Best Animated Short Film	Nominated
1994	The Wrong Trousers	BAFTA Awards	Best Short Animation	Won
1994	The Wrong Trousers	Academy Awards	Best Animated Short Film	Won
1994	The Wrong Trousers	Animafest	Best Animated Short Film	Won
1996	A Close Shave	BAFTA Awards	Best Short Animation	Won
1996	A Close Shave	Academy Awards	Best Animated Short Film	Won
2000	Chicken Run	BAFTA Awards	Alexander Korda Award for Best British Film	Nominated
2004	Creature Comforts	BAFTA Awards	Comedy Programme or Series Award	Nominated
2005	Wallace & Gromit: The Curse of the Were-Rabbit	Academy Awards	Best Animated Feature	Won
2006	Wallace & Gromit: The Curse of the Were-Rabbit	BAFTA Awards	Alexander Korda Award for Best British Film	Won
2008	Creature Comforts: "Don't Choke To Death, Please"	Emmy Award	Outstanding Animated Program (for Programming Less Than One Hour)	Nominated
2009	A Matter of Loaf and Death	BAFTA Awards	Best Short Animation	Won
2010	A Matter of Loaf and Death	Academy Awards	Best Animated Short Film	Nominated
2025	Wallace & Gromit: Vengeance Most Fowl	BAFTA Awards	Best Animated Film	Won
2025	Wallace & Gromit: Vengeance Most Fowl	BAFTA Awards	Outstanding British Film	Nominated
2025	Wallace & Gromit: Vengeance Most Fowl	BAFTA Awards	Children's and Family Film	Won
2025	Wallace & Gromit: Vengeance Most Fowl	Academy Awards	Best Animated Feature	Nominated

== See also ==
- List of Academy Award winners and nominees from Great Britain

Preceded by David Lean	NFTS Honorary Fellowship	Succeeded by Alan Parker
