= Wallace & Gromit: The Curse of the Were-Rabbit (video game) =

2005 platform video game

- North American cover art for the Xbox
- Developer: Frontier Developments
- Publisher: Konami
- Platforms: PlayStation 2, Xbox
- Release: NA: 29 September 2005; PAL: 14 October 2005
- Genre: Platform
- Modes: Single-player, multiplayer

Wallace & Gromit: The Curse of the Were-Rabbit is a platform video game developed by Frontier Developments and published by Konami. It was released for the PlayStation 2 and Xbox consoles. It was released in 2005 in North America in September, Europe and Australia in October, and in Japan the following year on 16 March 2006 for the PlayStation 2. It is based on the film of the same name by DreamWorks Animation and Aardman Animations. A version for the GameCube was also announced but was never released.

== Gameplay ==
The main characters are Wallace (voiced by Peter Sallis) and his dog Gromit, whose new company, Anti-Pesto, is charged with keeping rabbits away from the upcoming Giant Vegetable Competition, which has been run by Lady Tottington's family at Tottington Hall for 517 years.

Cards must be collected to advance through the game. These can be obtained by completing tasks given by other characters, regaining the valves from Wallace's "Mind-O-Matic" machine that have been stolen by Lady Tottington's suitor, Victor Quartermaine, or by simply finding hidden cards. Residents of the game's various districts give tasks in exchange for cards.

Gromit using a bunnyhopper in the Town Centre

The game is divided into four districts; The Town Centre, Wallersey the harbour area, Grimsley the industrial area and Tottington Hall. In each district there is at least one "arena", an area which Anti-Pesto must clear of pests. Arenas can be revisited at night, where Wallace is replaced by Hutch, who was originally a captive rabbit but swapped roles with Wallace after an accident with Wallace's invention, the Mind-O-Matic.

Wallace, Gromit, and Hutch each carry a primary pest-catching device, The BunGun. The BunGun is used to suck up pests and shoot them into a drain. Once in the drain, the pests are transported through the sewage system into Wallace and Gromit's basement, where they are kept captive. At nightfall, Gromit and Hutch can use the BunGun as a weapon to destroy were-creatures with a swing of the gun. Once dead, their "were energy" is stored in the BunGun, and can be used to destroy more creatures. The were energy can also be used to stun the Were-Rabbit.

Gromit can visit Mr. Caliche's shop, where he can purchase items to help grow the marrow that he's preparing for the Giant Vegetable Competition.

During the night, the Were-Rabbit tends to appear at random. Gromit and Hutch must chase it down and try and stop it from escaping. However, at the end of each chase, the Were-Rabbit hops over a barbed-wire fence which Wallace/Hutch and Gromit can't get over until it is opened.

As the duo progress through the game, a fortune teller, Madame Winnie Bago, who befriended Wallace and Gromit after they fixed her van, offers them tips and hints to help them complete tasks successfully.

At the end of the game, if the player has grown Gromit's marrow to its full potential, a post credits sequence plays where Lady Tottington visits Wallace & Gromit's house and awards Gromit The Golden Carrot.

== Reception ==
Reception

Aggregate score
Aggregator	Score	
Aggregator	PS2	Xbox
Metacritic	68/100	70/100

Review scores
Publication	Score	
Publication	PS2	Xbox
Eurogamer	5/10	N/A
Famitsu	26/40	N/A
Game Informer	7/10	7/10
GamePro	N/A	2.5/5
GameSpot	6.3/10	6.3/10
GameZone	5.1/10	N/A
IGN	6.5/10	N/A
Official U.S. PlayStation Magazine	3/5	N/A
Official Xbox Magazine (US)	N/A	6/10
VideoGamer.com	5/10	5/10
The Times	4/5	4/5

Wallace & Gromit: The Curse of the Were-Rabbit received "average" reviews according to the review aggregation website Metacritic. In Japan, Famitsu gave the PlayStation 2 version a score of three sixes and one eight for a total of 26 out of 40.
