= Wallace & Gromit: The Curse of the Were-Rabbit =

2005 animated film by Nick Park and Steve Box

- British theatrical release poster
- Directed by: Nick Park; Steve Box
- Screenplay by: Steve Box; Nick Park; Mark Burton; Bob Baker
- Based on: Wallace & Gromit by Nick Park
- Produced by: Peter Lord; David Sproxton; Nick Park; Claire Jennings; Carla Shelley
- Starring: Peter Sallis; Ralph Fiennes; Helena Bonham Carter; Peter Kay
- Cinematography: David Alex Riddett; Tristan Oliver
- Edited by: David McCormick; Gregory Perler
- Music by: Julian Nott
- Production companies: DreamWorks Animation SKG; Aardman Features
- Distributed by: DreamWorks Distribution (Note: In July 2014, the film's distribution rights were purchased by DreamWorks Animation from Paramount Pictures (owners of the pre-2005 DreamWorks Pictures catalog) and transferred to 20th Century Fox before reverting to Universal Pictures in 2018 following NBCUniversal's acquisition of DreamWorks Animation in 2016.) (United States); United International Pictures (United Kingdom and Ireland)
- Release dates: 4 September 2005 (Sydney); 7 October 2005 (United States); 14 October 2005 (United Kingdom)
- Running time: 85 minutes
- Countries: United Kingdom; United States
- Language: English
- Budget: $30 million
- Box office: $192.7 million

Wallace & Gromit: The Curse of the Were-Rabbit is a 2005 stop-motion animated comedy horror film directed by Nick Park and Steve Box and written by Park, Box, Mark Burton and Bob Baker. Produced by DreamWorks Animation SKG and Aardman Features, it is the fourth installment in the Wallace & Gromit series and the first to be feature-length. Peter Sallis stars as Wallace, while the supporting cast includes Ralph Fiennes, Helena Bonham Carter and Peter Kay.

A parody of classic monster films, the film centres on inventor Wallace and his dog, Gromit, in their latest venture as pest control agents. They come to the rescue of their town, which is plagued by rabbits, before the annual giant vegetable competition. However, the duo soon find themselves opposing a rabbit-like monster.

Following the release of Aardman's first feature film Chicken Run in 2000, DreamWorks and Aardman announced their next co-productions, one of which was a feature-length Wallace & Gromit film. Production began in September 2003. During the making, Park was sent several notes by DreamWorks requesting for changes to the film to appeal more to contemporary American audiences. This included changing the initial subtitle, The Great Vegetable Plot, to The Curse of the Were-Rabbit. Julian Nott, who composed the score for the prior Wallace & Gromit shorts, returned for the film.

The film premiered in Sydney, Australia, on 4 September 2005, before being released in theaters in the United States on 7 October 2005 and in the United Kingdom on 14 October 2005. While the film was considered a box-office disappointment in the US by DreamWorks Animation, it was more commercially successful internationally. It also received critical acclaim and won a number of awards, including the Academy Award for Best Animated Feature (making it the first stop-motion feature to win an Academy Award) and BAFTA Award for Best British Film. A fifth installment and fourth short film, A Matter of Loaf and Death was released in 2008 and a sixth installment and second feature-length film, Vengeance Most Fowl, was released in 2024.

== Plot ==
With Tottington Hall's annual giant vegetable competition around the corner, Wallace and Gromit run Anti-Pesto, a humane pest control business aimed at protecting the townspeople's vegetables from rabbits. One day, the duo are hired to capture rabbits from the garden of the hall's owner Lady Campanula Tottington, which inspires Wallace to use his newest invention, the "Mind Manipulation-O-Matic", to try brainwashing rabbits into disliking vegetables and increasing his appetite for them in the process to help himself lose weight. He ends up accidentally fusing his brain with that of a rabbit. Gromit destroys the Mind-O-Matic, and the rabbit, now averse to vegetables, is named Hutch and placed in a cage.

That night, a "Were-Rabbit" wreaks havoc on the town's gardens. During a town meeting the next day, hunter Lord Victor Quartermaine volunteers to vanquish the creature, but Tottington persuades the townsfolk to give Anti-Pesto another chance. Following an unsuccessful effort to trap the Were-Rabbit by using a giant fake female rabbit, Wallace and Gromit find that Hutch has mutated, leading Wallace to conclude that Hutch is the creature. However, Gromit discovers a trail of rabbit tracks turning into human footprints, as well as a pile of half-eaten vegetables in Wallace's bedroom, which makes him realise that Wallace is the real culprit.

After celebrating his triumph with Tottington, Wallace is confronted by Victor, who vies for Tottington's affections and wealth. During the confrontation, the full moon appears and Wallace transforms into the Were-Rabbit. Victor, now seeing the perfect chance to eliminate his rival, acquires some golden bullets from eccentric town vicar Reverend Clement Hedges.

On the day of the vegetable competition, Wallace and Gromit discover that Hutch now possesses Wallace's human traits, including his love for cheese. Upon learning that the Were-Rabbit is still at large, Tottington reluctantly agrees to let Victor vanquish it. When Wallace transforms again, Victor arrives and attempts to shoot him, but Gromit intervenes. Victor detains Gromit in a cage, but he escapes with the help of Hutch and they quickly devise a plan to save Wallace.

At the competition, Victor seizes the competition's trophy to use as ammunition after exhausting his golden bullets. Gromit tries to lure Wallace away using the giant marrow he planned on entering in the competition, but Wallace gets distracted and the marrow ends up getting squashed when Hutch drives the Anti-Pesto van into a cheese tent. Gromit subdues Victor's dog, Philip, in a dogfight using aeroplanes from a fairground ride. As Victor aims at Wallace, Gromit uses his plane to deflect the trophy, but the damaged plane begins to fall and Wallace leaps to catch Gromit; they both land in the cheese tent. Gromit disguises Victor as the Were-Rabbit using the female rabbit costume and the townspeople chase him away.

Wallace morphs back to his human form, now free from the effects of his invention, and appears dead, but soon comes around thanks to his love for cheese. Gromit receives the trophy for his marrow and bravery and Tottington converts the grounds of Tottington Hall into a nature reserve for Hutch and his fellow rabbits.

== Voice cast ==
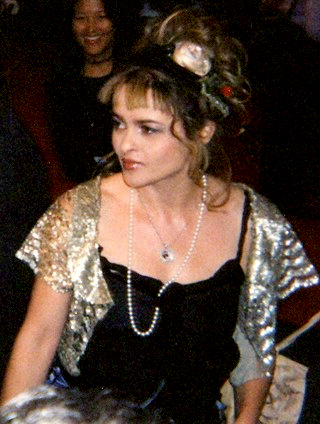
Helena Bonham Carter at the film's North American premiere at the 2005 Toronto International Film Festival

- Peter Sallis as Wallace, an eccentric, absent-minded and accident-prone yet good-natured inventor with a great fondness for cheese, who operates Anti-Pesto with his dog and best friend, Gromit.
  - Sallis additionally portrayed Hutch, a kidnapped rabbit who gradually develops Wallace's mannerisms — his dialogue consists almost entirely of phrases and statements previously made by Wallace — after an attempted mind-alteration goes wrong and who is at first suspected to be the Were-Rabbit. Sallis' voice was digitally accelerated to create Hutch's.
- Helena Bonham Carter as Lady Campanula "Totty" Tottington, a wealthy aristocratic spinster with a keen interest in vegetable horticulture and 'fluffy' animals. For more than five centuries, the Tottington family has hosted an annual vegetable competition on their estate on the same night. Lady Tottington asks Wallace to call her "Totty" (which is a British term for an aristocratic and attractive woman) and develops a romantic interest in him. Her forename, Campanula, is the scientific name of a bellflower, and her surname is taken from the Lancashire village of Tottington.
- Ralph Fiennes as Lord Victor Quartermaine, a cruel upper class bounder and a prideful hunter who is courting Lady Tottington for her fortune. He wears a toupée and despises Wallace and Gromit.
  - Philip is Victor's vicious but cowardly and dimwitted hunting dog who resembles a Bull Terrier. He is too cowardly to face the Were-Rabbit so he instead targets Gromit.
- Peter Kay as Police Constable Albert Mackintosh, the local village policeman who judges the Giant Vegetable Contest, though he would prefer it if the "troublemaking" competition did not happen.
- Nicholas Smith as Reverend Clement Hedges, the superstitious town vicar and the first resident to witness the Were-Rabbit.
- Liz Smith as Mrs. Mulch, wife to Mr. Mulch and neighbour of Wallace and Gromit who raise prize-winning pumpkins.
- Dicken Ashworth as Mr. Mulch, husband to Mrs. Mulch and neighbour of Wallace and Gromit who raise prize-winning pumpkins.
- Edward Kelsey as Mr. Growbag, an elderly resident of Wallace and Gromit's neighbourhood and a founding member of the town's vegetable growers' council.
- Mark Gatiss as Miss Blight, a resident of Wallace and Gromit's neighbourhood.
- Geraldine McEwan as Miss Thripp, an Anti-Pesto customer. McEwan reprises her role in A Matter of Loaf and Death.
- John Thomson as Mr. Windfall
- Vincent Ebrahim as Mr. Caliche
- Robert Horvath as Mr. Dibber
- Pete Atkin as Mr. Crock
- Noni Lewis as Mrs. Girdling
- Ben Whitehead as Mr. Leaching

== Production ==
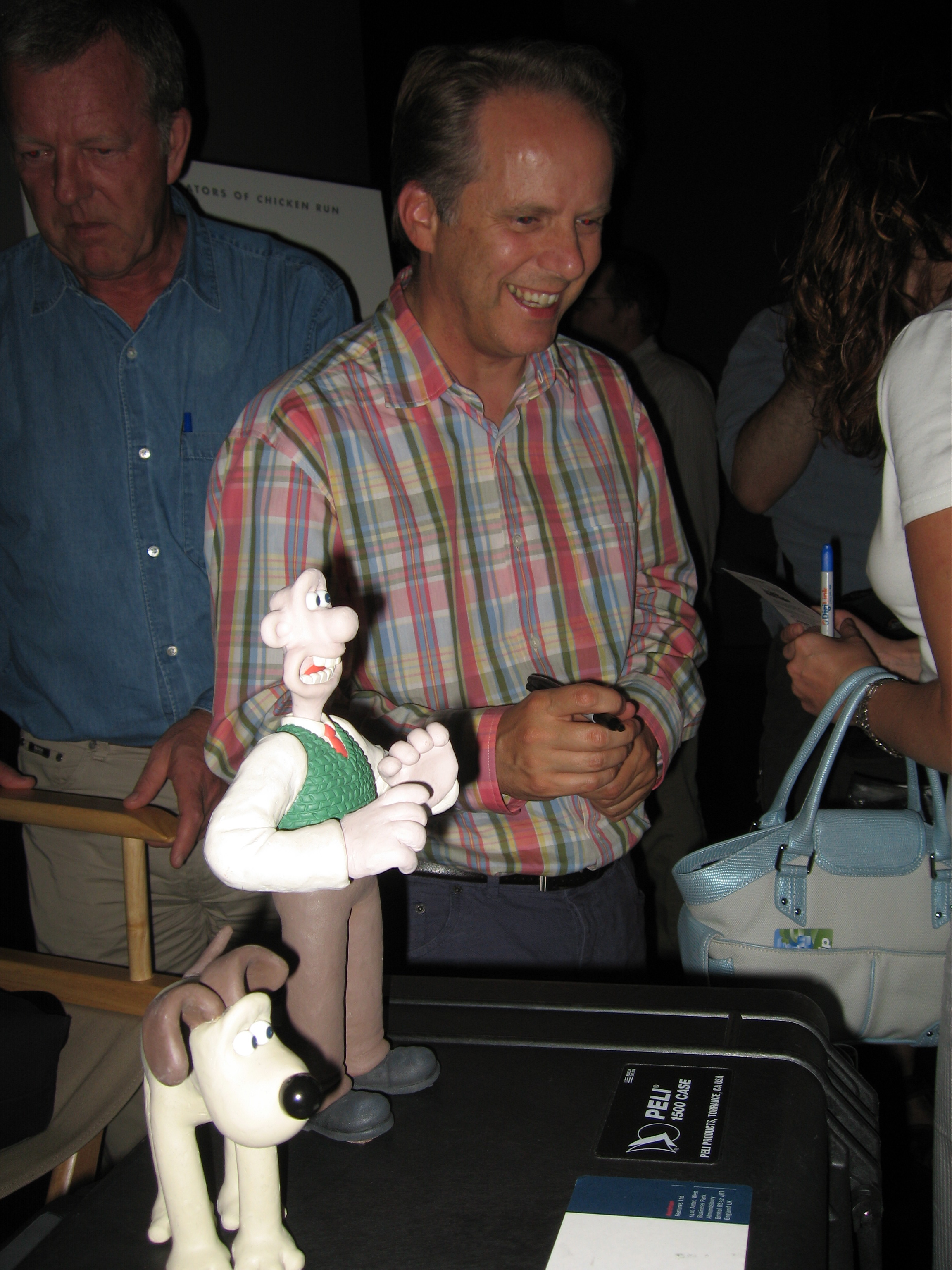
Director Nick Park at the premiere

In March 2000, it was officially announced that Wallace and Gromit were to star in their own feature film. It would have been Aardman's next film after The Tortoise and the Hare, which was subsequently abandoned by the studio in July 2001, owing to script problems.

The directors, Nick Park and Steve Box, have often referred to the film as the world's "first vegetarian horror film". Peter Sallis (the voice of Wallace) is joined in the film by Ralph Fiennes (as Lord Victor Quartermaine), Helena Bonham Carter (as Lady Campanula Tottington), Peter Kay (as PC Mackintosh), Nicholas Smith (as Rev. Clement Hedges), and Liz Smith (as Mrs. Mulch). As established in the preceding short films, Gromit is a silent character, communicating purely via body language.

The film was originally going to be called Wallace & Gromit: The Great Vegetable Plot, but the title was changed, as the market research disliked it. The first reported release date for The Great Vegetable Plot was November 2004. Production officially began in September 2003, and the film was then set for release on 30 September 2005. In July 2003, Entertainment Weekly referred to the film as Wallace & Gromit: The Curse of the Were-Rabbit.

Park said that after separate test screenings with British and American audiences, including children on both sides, he adjusted the characters' speech for American audiences. Park was often sent notes from DreamWorks, which stressed him. He recalled one note that Wallace's car should be trendier, which he disagreed with because he felt making things look old-fashioned made it look more ironic.

The vehicle Wallace drives in the film is an Austin A35 van. In collaboration with Aardman in the spring of 2005, a road going replica of the model was created by brothers Mark and David Armé, founders of the International Austin A30/A35 Register, for promotional purposes. In a 500-man-hour customisation, an original 1964 van received a full body restoration, before being dented and distressed to perfectly replicate the model van used in the film. The official colour of the van is Preston Green, named in honour of Nick Park's hometown. The name was chosen by the art director and Mark Armé.

Shortly after the film's release, the Aardman Animations' warehouse caught on fire which resulted thirty years of work on past projects being destroyed, along with the character models and sets made for the film being destroyed as well.

== Distribution ==
It was the final DreamWorks Animation film to be distributed by DreamWorks Pictures, as the studio spun-off as an independent studio in 2004 until its acquisition by Comcast and NBCUniversal in 2016. In July 2014, the film's distribution rights were purchased by DreamWorks Animation from Paramount Pictures (owners of the pre-2005 DreamWorks Pictures catalogue) and transferred to 20th Century Fox before reverting to Universal Pictures in 2018, following the acquisition of DreamWorks Animation by Comcast and NBCUniversal in 2016. However, Aardman Animations still retains complete ownership of the film.

== Release ==
Shortly before the film's release a promotional tie-in of the film was made at Burger King in the UK and US. The film had its worldwide premiere on 4 September 2005, in Sydney, Australia. It was theatrically released in the United States on 7 October 2005, and in the United Kingdom the following week. The film was accompanied by the short film The Madagascar Penguins in a Christmas Caper, starring the penguins from the Madagascar franchise.

In April 2025, the film had a special 20th anniversary re-release in UK cinemas.

=== Home media ===
In Region 2, the film was released not only on VHS but also in a two-disc special edition DVD that includes Cracking Contraptions, plus a number of other extras on 20 February 2006. In Region 1, the film was released on DVD in widescreen and full-screen versions and VHS on 7 February 2006. Walmart stores carried a special version with an additional DVD, "Gromit's Tail-Waggin' DVD" which included the test shorts made for this production, making of the Were-Rabbit creature, memorable moments of the film titled "Gromit's Favorite Scenes", a video showing the legacy of the "Wallace and Gromit" franchise, an instructional video on how to draw Gromit, as well as "Cracking Contraptions" shorts.

A companion game, also titled Curse of the Were-Rabbit, was released with the film. A novelization, Wallace and Gromit: The Curse of the Were-Rabbit: The Movie Novelization by Penny Worms (ISBN 0-8431-1667-6), was also produced.

The Curse of the Were-Rabbit was the final DreamWorks Animation film released on VHS. It was released on DVD on 13 May 2014 as part of a triple film set, along with the Aardman/DreamWorks films Chicken Run and Flushed Away. A Blu-ray edition was released by Universal Pictures Home Entertainment in the United States on 4 June 2019.

== Reception ==
=== Box office ===
Wallace & Gromit: The Curse of the Were-Rabbit opened in 3,645 cinemas and had an opening weekend gross of $16 million, putting it at number one for that weekend. During its second weekend it came in at number two, just $200,000 behind The Fog. The film grossed £9.4 million pounds during its opening weekend in the United Kingdom. The Curse of the Were-Rabbit grossed $192.6 million at the box office, of which $56.1 million was from the United States. As of January 2023, it is the second-highest-grossing stop-motion animated film of all time behind Aardman's first feature film, Chicken Run.

=== Critical response ===
On Rotten Tomatoes, the film holds an approval rating of 95% based on 180 reviews and an average rating of 8.3/10. The website's critical consensus reads, "The Curse of the Were-Rabbit is a subtly touching and wonderfully eccentric adventure featuring Wallace and Gromit". On Metacritic, the film received a weighted average score of 87 out of 100, based on 38 critics, indicating "universal acclaim". Audiences polled by CinemaScore gave the film an average grade of "B+" on an A+ to F scale.

In 2016, Empire magazine ranked it 51st on their list of the 100 best British films, with their entry stating, "The sparkling Curse Of The Were-Rabbit positively brims with ideas and energy, dazzling movie fans with sly references to everything from Hammer horrors and The Incredible Hulk to King Kong and Top Gun, and bounds along like a hound in a hurry. The plot pitches the famously taciturn Dogwarts' alumnus and his Wensleydale-chomping owner (Sallis) against the dastardly Victor Quartermaine (Fiennes), taking mutating bunnies, prize-winning marrows and the posh-as-biscuits Lady Tottington (Bonham Carter) along for the ride. In short, it's the most marvellously English animation there is". Empire also gave the film five stars out of five. It also largely praised Peter Sallis's performance, including it in a list of "The 50 Greatest Voice Performances on Movies", compiled by Helen O'Hara. Paul Arendt of BBC News gave the film five out of five stars and praised the film's charm, humour, and handcrafted animation, highlighting its inventive visual gags, affectionate horror pastiche, and quintessentially English sensibility. He commended its "sheer good humour" and celebrated Nick Park's creativity, concluding that The Curse of the Were‑Rabbit confirms Aardman as a uniquely imaginative force in animation.

In a 2005 review in The New York Times, A. O. Scott primarily praised the film for its charm and ingenuity, and for the character of Gromit, summarising it as a "delightful, clever, and sane-making stop-motion comedy". Roger Ebert of the Chicago Sun-Times, gave the film three and a half stars out of four, describing it as "whimsical, funny, and endlessly inventive". He also called Wallace and Gromit the two most delightful characters in the history of animation. Peter Bradshaw of The Guardian, gave the film five stars out of five, calling it "thoroughly delightful" and a "brilliantly" crafted family comedy, celebrating its high‑IQ writing, inventive visual humour, and quintessentially English charm. He admired the exuberant gags, meticulous animation, and strong voice performances, concluding that Nick Park's work delivers "pure, unpretentious joy" and stands as top‑tier entertainment for both children and adults.

Jane Horwitz of The Washington Post gave it a glowing review, calling it a "funny, punny, bunny tale full of the visual jokes and quirky Britishisms". She noted that while a few mild scares and innuendos might elude very young viewers, the films stop‑motion craft, energetic gags, and affectionate tone make it a delight for most audiences. Kevin Maher, writing for The Times, gave the film five stars out of five, and said: "Ralph Fiennes is inspired casting in his first fully comedic role as the gun-toting Victor Quartermaine, but Helena Bonham Carter steals the movie as the guileless animal-loving aristocrat Lady Tottington of Tottington Hall". Marc Lee of The Daily Telegraph gave the film four stars out of five, and said: "The Curse of the Were-Rabbit, featuring his heroic man-and-dog duo, Wallace and Gromit, is Park at his sublimely silly best". Anthony Quinn of The Independent gave the film five stars out of five, calling it "The Plasticine's finest hour".

Common Sense Media gave the film four stars out of five, describing it as "[a] funny and charming movie for the whole family".

=== Accolades ===
Group	Award	Recipients	Result
78th Academy Awards	Best Animated Feature Film	Nick Park; Steve Box	Won
33rd Annie Awards	Best Animated Effects	Jason Wen	Won
33rd Annie Awards	Best Animated Feature		Won
33rd Annie Awards	Best Character Animation	Claire Billet	Won
33rd Annie Awards	Best Character Design in an Animated Feature Production	Nick Park	Won
33rd Annie Awards	Best Directing in an Animated Feature Production	Nick Park; Steve Box	Won
33rd Annie Awards	Best Music in an Animated Feature Production	Julian Nott	Won
33rd Annie Awards	Best Production Design in an Animated Feature Production	Phil Lewis	Won
33rd Annie Awards	Best Storyboarding in an Animated Feature Production	Bob Persichetti	Won
33rd Annie Awards	Best Voice Acting in an Animated Feature Production	Peter Sallis as the voice of Wallace	Won
33rd Annie Awards	Best Writing in an Animated Feature Production	Steve Box; Nick Park; Mark Burton; Bob Baker	Won
33rd Annie Awards	Best Character Animation	Jay Grace	Nominated
33rd Annie Awards	Best Character Animation	Christopher Sadler	Nominated
33rd Annie Awards	Best Storyboarding in an Animated Feature Production	Michael Salter	Nominated
33rd Annie Awards	Best Voice Acting in an Animated Feature Production	Helena Bonham Carter as the voice of Lady Campanula Tottington	Nominated
33rd Annie Awards	Best Voice Acting in an Animated Feature Production	Ralph Fiennes as the voice of Victor Quartermaine	Nominated
33rd Annie Awards	Best Voice Acting in an Animated Feature Production	Nicholas Smith as the voice of Reverend Clement Hedges	Nominated
59th British Academy Film Awards	Best British Film	Claire Jennings; David Sproxton; Nick Park; Steve Box; Mark Burton; Bob Baker	Won
British Academy Children's Awards	Feature Film	Nick Park; Steve Box; Peter Lord; David Sproxton	Won
British Comedy Awards	Best Comedy Film	Nick Park	Won
11th Critics' Choice Awards	Best Animated Feature	Nick Park and Steve Box	Won
Dallas-Fort Worth Film Critics Association	Best Animated Feature		Won
Empire Awards	Best Director	Nick Park; Steve Box	Won
Empire Awards	Best British Film		Nominated
Empire Awards	Best Comedy		Nominated
Empire Awards	Scene of the Year		Nominated
Florida Film Critics Circle Awards 2005	Best Animated Film		Won
50th Hugo Awards	Best Dramatic Presentation – Long Form		Nominated
London Film Critics Circle Awards 2005	British Film of the Year		Nominated
Los Angeles Film Critics Association Awards 2005	Best Animated Film		Won
53rd Motion Picture Sound Editors Golden Reel Awards	Best Sound Editing in Feature Film – Animated		Won
Golden Tomato Awards 2005	Best Animated Film		Won
Golden Tomato Awards 2005	Best Wide Release		Won
New York Film Critics Online Awards 2005	Best Animated Film		Won
2006 Kids' Choice Awards	Favorite Animated Movie	Wallace and Gromit: The Curse of the Were-Rabbit	Nominated
Online Film Critics Society Awards 2005	Best Animated Feature		Won
17th Producers Guild of America Awards	Producer of the Year Award in Animated Theatrical Motion Pictures	Claire Jennings; Nick Park	Won
10th Satellite Awards	Outstanding Motion Picture, Animated or Mixed Media		Nominated
32nd Saturn Awards	Best Animated Film		Nominated
Toronto Film Critics Association Awards 2005	Best Animated Film	Nick Park and Steve Box	Won
Visual Effects Society Awards 2005	Outstanding Animated Character in an Animated Motion Picture	Lloyd Price for "Gromit"	Won
Washington D.C. Area Film Critics Association	Best Animated Film		Won

== Soundtrack ==
The film's score was composed by Julian Nott, who also scored the previous entries in the franchise. The score was produced by Hans Zimmer, and additional music was provided by Rupert Gregson-Williams, James Dooley, Lorne Balfe and Alastair King.

== Future ==
After the box-office failure of Flushed Away resulted in a major write down for DreamWorks, it was reported on 3 October 2006 and confirmed on 30 January 2007 that DreamWorks had terminated their partnership with Aardman. In revealing the losses related to Flushed Away, DreamWorks also revealed they had taken a $29 million write down over Wallace & Gromit as well, with the film having drastically underperformed expectations in the home DVD market, despite grossing $192 million against a budget of only $30 million at the box office.

Following the split, Aardman retained complete ownership of the film, while DreamWorks Animation retained worldwide distribution rights in perpetuity, excluding some United Kingdom television rights and ancillary markets. Soon after the end of the agreement, Aardman announced that they would proceed with another Wallace & Gromit project, later revealed to be a return to their earlier short films with A Matter of Loaf and Death for BBC One.

During production of the short, Park remarked publicly on difficulties with working with DreamWorks during the production of The Curse of the Were-Rabbit, such as the constant production notes and demands to alter the material to appeal more to American children. This discouraged him from producing another feature film for years, with Lord noting that Park preferred the "half hour format". However, in 2022, a new Wallace & Gromit film was announced, titled Wallace & Gromit: Vengeance Most Fowl, which was released on Christmas Day 2024 on BBC One in the UK and released worldwide on Netflix on 3 January 2025. Park returned as co-director and story co-writer alongside Merlin Crossingham. Kay reprised his role of Mackintosh (who has been promoted to chief inspector), while Ben Whitehead took on the role of Wallace after the death of Peter Sallis, who voiced Wallace from 1989 to 2010, in 2017.
