= Wallace & Gromit =

British claymation comedy franchise

- Created by: Nick Park
- Owner: Aardman Animations
- Years: 1989–present

Print publications
- Comics: List of comic books

Films and television
- Films: Main series; The Curse of the Were-Rabbit (2005); Vengeance Most Fowl (2024); Spin-offs; Shaun the Sheep Movie (2015); A Shaun the Sheep Movie: Farmageddon (2019); Shaun the Sheep: The Beast of Mossy Bottom (2026)
- Short films: A Grand Day Out (1989); The Wrong Trousers (1993); A Close Shave (1995); A Matter of Loaf and Death (2008)
- Web series: Shaun the Sheep 3D (2012)
- Animated series: Main series; Wallace & Gromit's Cracking Contraptions (2002); Wallace & Gromit's World of Invention (2010); Spin-offs; Shaun the Sheep (2007–present); Timmy Time (2009–2012); Shaun the Sheep Championsheeps (2012)
- Television specials: Timmy Time: Timmy's Christmas Surprise (2011); Timmy Time: Timmy's Seaside Rescue (2012); Shaun the Sheep: The Farmer's Llamas (2015); Shaun the Sheep: The Flight Before Christmas (2021)

Theatrical presentations
- Plays: Wallace And Gromit Alive on Stage in a Grand Night Out (1997); Shaun's Big Show (2011)

Games
- Video games: List of video games

Wallace & Gromit is a British claymation comedy franchise created by Nick Park and produced by Aardman Animations. The series centres on Wallace, a good-natured, eccentric and cheese-loving bachelor inventor, and Gromit, his loyal and intelligent anthropomorphic dog. It consists of four short films, two feature-length films and numerous spin-offs and TV adaptations. The first short film, A Grand Day Out, was finished and released in 1989. Wallace has been voiced by Peter Sallis and Ben Whitehead. While Wallace speaks very often, Gromit is largely silent and has no dialogue, instead communicating through facial expressions and body language.

Because of their popularity, the characters have been described as positive international cultural icons of both modern British culture and the British in general. BBC News called them "some of the best-known and best-loved stars to come out of the UK". Culture24 outlet ICONS said they have done "more to improve the image of the English world-wide than any officially appointed ambassadors".

Park has stated that he was inspired by his childhood through the 1950s and 1960s in Lancashire in Northern England. The setting is deliberately ambiguous; the overall style resembles the 1960s, but numerous anachronisms abound, such as the use of 21st-century technology. Although Wigan is seen at the end of Wallace's alliterative home address on his letters, his accent comes from the Holme Valley of West Yorkshire, and he is especially fond of Wensleydale cheese (from North Yorkshire).

Their films have been widely praised, with the first three short films, A Grand Day Out (1989), The Wrong Trousers (1993) and A Close Shave (1995) earning 100% on Rotten Tomatoes; the feature film Wallace & Gromit: The Curse of the Were-Rabbit (2005) has also received acclaim. The film is the second-highest-grossing stop-motion animated film, outgrossed only by Chicken Run (2000), another creation of Park's. A fourth short film, A Matter of Loaf and Death, was released in 2008. A second full-length feature film, Wallace & Gromit: Vengeance Most Fowl – marking the return of the penguin Feathers McGraw, the villain from The Wrong Trousers – was released in 2024. Shaun the Sheep is a spin-off of the franchise, featuring the character introduced in A Close Shave and debuting in 2007. The franchise has received numerous accolades, including seven BAFTAs, three Academy Awards and a Peabody Award.

== History ==
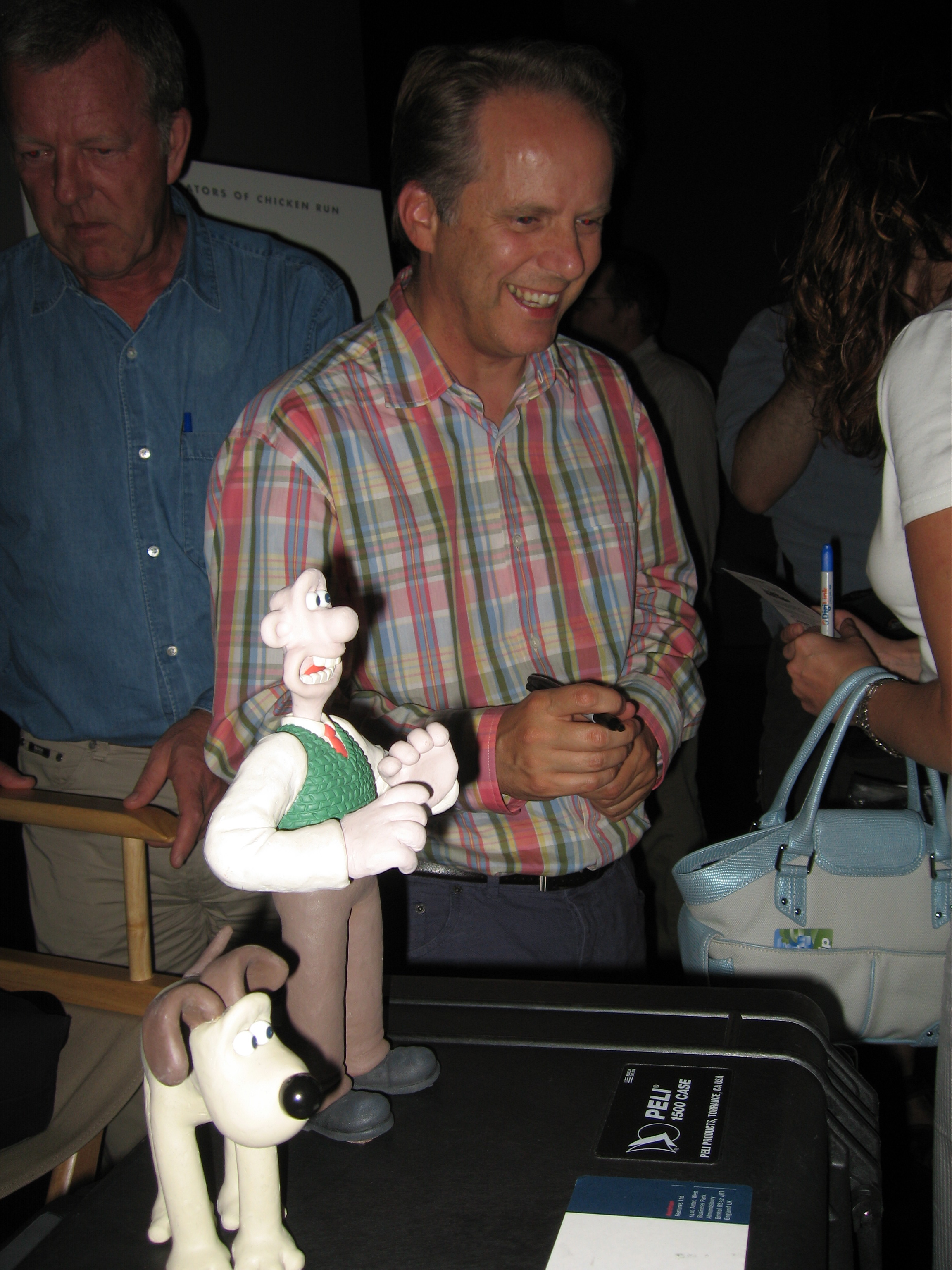
Creator Nick Park with his characters in 2005 promoting Wallace & Gromit: The Curse of the Were-Rabbit

The first short film, A Grand Day Out (1989), was nominated for the Academy Award for Best Animated Short Film in 1991. The short films The Wrong Trousers (1993) and A Close Shave (1995) followed, both of which won the aforementioned award. The first full-length feature film, Wallace & Gromit: The Curse of the Were-Rabbit was released in 2005, and went on to win the Academy Award for Best Animated Feature.

In January 2007, a five-film deal with DreamWorks and Aardman fell through after three films, due to creative differences, as well as the box office failure of Flushed Away. Park said later that DreamWorks executives wanted to Americanise the very British Wallace and Gromit after test screenings, which would have tarnished some of the duo's nostalgic charm. The fourth Wallace & Gromit short, A Matter of Loaf and Death, was Park's first production since the end of the DreamWorks deal. It was the most-watched television programme in the UK in 2008. A Matter of Loaf and Death won the 2008 BAFTA Award for Best Short Animation and was nominated for an Academy Award in 2010. In 2013, Peter Lord stated that there were no plans at the moment for a new short film, and Park announced in the following year that the declining health of Wallace's voice actor, Peter Sallis, had the possibility of preventing any future films despite the availability of Ben Whitehead. In May 2017, Lord stated that more projects with the characters were likely while speaking at an animation event in Stuttgart, Germany. He said, "When Nick [Park]'s not drawing cavemen, he's drawing Wallace & Gromit ... I absolutely assume he will do another, but not a feature. I think he found it was too much. I think he liked the half-hour format."

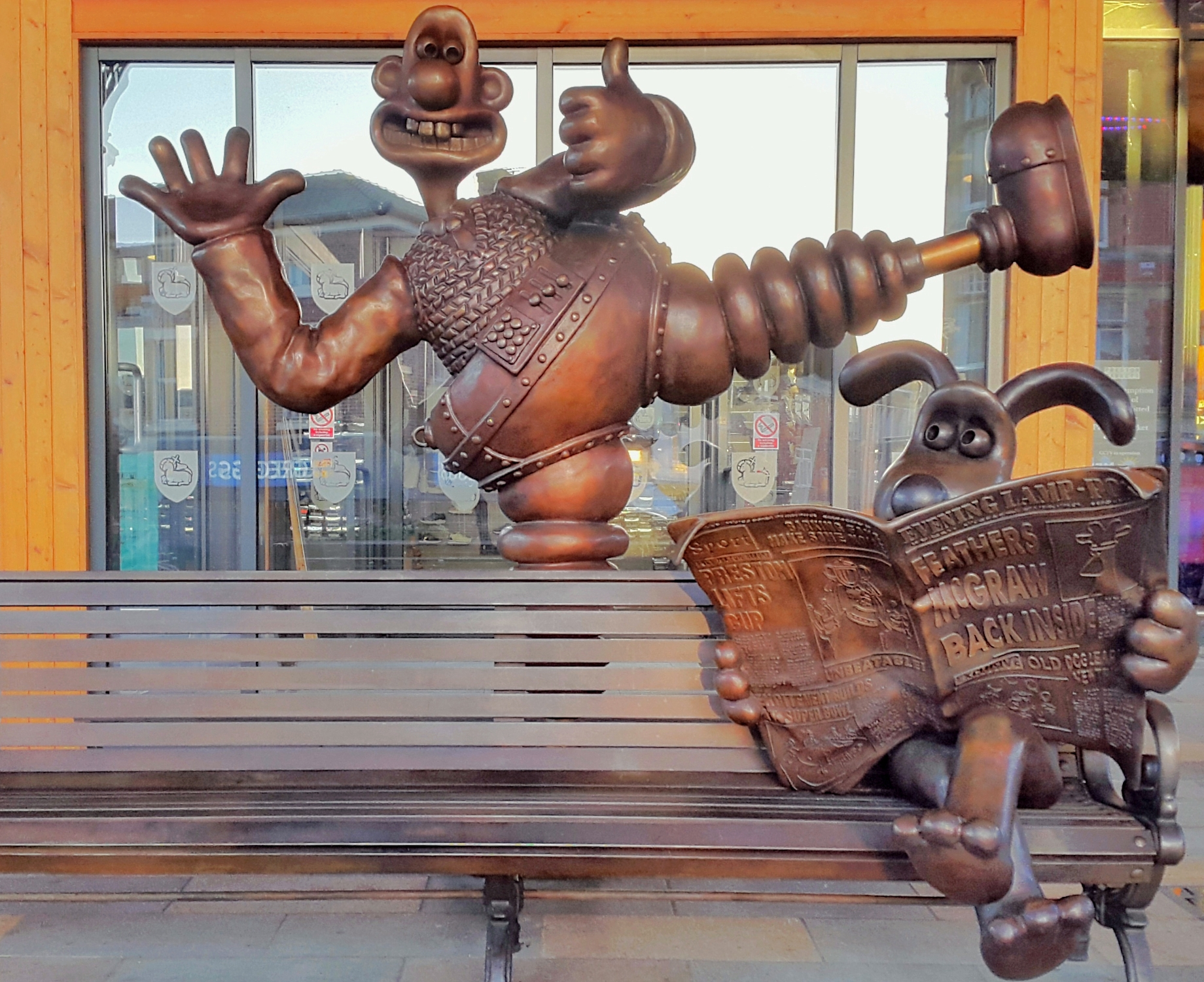
Wallace and Gromit bronze sculpture in Park's home town of Preston, Lancashire, England

Sallis died on 2 June 2017. In 2018, Park said to Radio Times: "[Sallis] was such a special one-off person with such unique qualities, it would be hard to fill his shoes but I think he'd want us to carry on and I've got more Wallace and Gromit ideas." In 2019, Park announced that a new Wallace & Gromit project is in development. "I can't give too much away because it would spoil it really, but it's Wallace & Gromit up to their old antics." In May 2020, Aardman announced the release of The Big Fix Up, a Wallace & Gromit story in the form of an augmented reality (AR) mobile app. It features the voices of Miriam Margolyes, Isy Suttie and Jim Carter and was released on 18 January 2021.

In September 2021, a bronze bench statue of Wallace & Gromit was unveiled in Preston, Lancashire, Park's home town. A statue of Feathers McGraw was later added as part of an extension in February 2025. In January 2022, a new feature film, Wallace & Gromit: Vengeance Most Fowl, was announced, which debuted first on the BBC on Christmas Day 2024, and was released worldwide on Netflix on 3 January 2025, winning two awards at the 78th British Academy Film Awards and additionally being nominated for the Academy Award for Best Animated Feature. Featuring Feathers McGraw, Michael Hogan writes: "The definitive screen villain of our age is a penguin with a red rubber glove on its head. The fact that he's mute with expressionless beady eyes only makes him more terrifying."

A Lego Ideas set of Wallace and Gromit's motorcycle from A Close Shave was released on 1 October 2026, created by user Pidelium as part of the LEGO Ideas "90s Throwback - The Next Chapter!" contest. It is the first Lego set based on the works of Aardman.

== Overview ==
Wallace (left), with his dog Gromit (right), the main characters of the franchise

=== Wallace ===
Wallace lives with his pet dog Gromit at No. 62 West Wallaby Street in Wigan, England. He usually wears brown woollen trousers, a white shirt with detachable sleeves, and a red tie under a green vee-necked knitted sleeveless sweater. He is fond of cheese, especially Wensleydale, with crackers.

Nick Park, his creator, said: "He's a very self-contained figure. A very homely sort who doesn't mind the odd adventure." He is loosely based on Park's father and Park has never made it clear as to whether Wallace is the character's forename or surname, preferring to leave this ambiguous.

Wallace's accent comes from the Holme Valley of West Yorkshire. Wallace was voiced by Peter Sallis until his retirement in 2010, being succeeded by Ben Whitehead.

Wallace is an inveterate inventor, creating elaborate contraptions that often do not work wholly as intended. Their appearance is similar to the illustrations of W. Heath Robinson and Rube Goldberg, where Nick Park has said of Wallace that all his inventions are designed around the principle of using a "sledge-hammer to crack a nut". Some of Wallace's contraptions are based on real-life inventions. For example, his method of waking up in the morning uses a bed that tips up to wake up its owner, an invention labelled an "Alarm bed" that was exhibited at the Great Exhibition of 1851 in London.

Wallace has had three romantic interests. The first was wool shop owner Wendolene Ramsbottom, which ended quickly when Wendolene told Wallace that she was allergic to some cheese. The second was Lady Campanula Tottington in The Curse of the Were-Rabbit, whom Wallace fondly calls "Totty". In A Matter of Loaf & Death, Wallace becomes engaged to Piella Bakewell, who turns out to be a serial killer of bakers.

=== Gromit ===
"Gromit doesn't ever say a word, but there has never been a more expressive character (animated or otherwise) to grace our screens."

— Empire magazine's entry for Gromit placing the dog first in their list of "the 50 best animated movie characters".

Gromit lacks a mouth and cannot speak, but can communicate complex emotions such as confusion using his eyebrows.

Gromit is a dog with a cream-coloured short-hair coat and oversized, floppy, dark brown ears, who is Wallace's pet and best friend. He is very intelligent, having graduated from "Dogwarts University" ("Dogwarts" being a pun on "Hogwarts", the wizard school from the Harry Potter books) with a double first in Engineering for Dogs. He likes knitting, playing chess, reading the newspaper, tea, and cooking. His prized possessions include his alarm clock, dog bone, brush, and a framed photo of himself with Wallace. He is very adept with electronic equipment and an excellent aeroplane pilot. He often threatens the plans of the antagonists he and Wallace encounter in their adventures. Sometimes, Gromit ignores Wallace's orders, such as in A Close Shave and Shopper 13, where Wallace orders him to get rid of Shaun but Gromit does not. Gromit's birthday is 12 February. In The Wrong Trousers, he is seen circling the date on a calendar.

Gromit has no visible mouth and expresses himself through facial expressions and body language. Peter Hawkins originally intended to voice Gromit, but Park dropped the idea when he realised how Gromit's thoughts and feelings could be displayed through movement with some canine noises on rare occasions. Many critics believe that Gromit's silence makes him the perfect straight man, with a pantomime expressiveness that drew favourable comparisons to Buster Keaton. He does at times make dog-like noises, such as yelps and growling. According to the fortieth anniversary documentary A Grand Night In: The Story of Aardman, Gromit was originally supposed to be a cat, but the idea was dropped as Park realised that animating a dog was easier.

Generally speaking, Gromit's tastes are more in vogue than those of Wallace; this being one of the many ways they contrast with each other as characters. Gromit seems to have a significant interest in encyclopaedic, classical and philosophical literature, and popular culture, including film and music. Electronics for Dogs has been a firm favourite since A Grand Day Out, and in The Wrong Trousers Gromit's bookshelves feature titles such as Kites, Sticks, Sheep, Penguins, Rockets, Bones and Stars, while he is seen reading The Republic, by Pluto (a nod to the Disney character of the same name and a pun on Plato) and Crime and Punishment, by Fido Dogstoyevsky (a pun on Fyodor Dostoyevsky). Gromit's various possessions make extensive use of puns: A Matter of Loaf and Death features "Pup Fiction" (Pulp Fiction), "The Dogfather" (The Godfather), "Where Beagles Dare" (Where Eagles Dare), "Bite Club" (Fight Club) and "The Bone Identity" (The Bourne Identity) all as book titles, and "Citizen Canine" (Citizen Kane) as a film poster. In Vengeance Most Fowl, he is shown reading A Room of One's Own, by "Virginia Woof" (a pun on Virginia Woolf), and Paradise Lost, by "John Stilton" (a pun on John Milton). His taste in music has been shown to cover Bach (presumably punning on "bark"), "Poochini" (a play on Puccini), "McFlea" (McFly), "The Beagles" (the Beatles), "Red Hot Chili Puppies" (Red Hot Chili Peppers), "Puppy Love" by Doggy Osmond (Donny Osmond), "The Hound of Music" (The Sound of Music) and "Walkies on the Wild Side" by Rod Lead.

Gromit gains his own love interest in A Matter of Loaf and Death, when he becomes attached to Fluffles, a poodle.

NASA named one of its new prototype Mars explorer robots after Gromit in 2005. On 1 April 2007, HMV announced that Gromit would stand in for Nipper for a three-month period, promoting children's DVDs in its UK stores.

=== Location ===
Model of "the Soccamatic" invented by Wallace, from Wallace & Gromit's Cracking Contraptions, on display at the National Football Museum in Manchester

Although not overtly setting the series in any particular town, Nick Park had previously hinted that its milieu was inspired by thoughts of 1950s Wigan, reinforced by an A–Z Wigan being displayed on Wallace's Anti-Pesto van in The Curse of the Were-Rabbit. In The Wrong Trousers, Gromit picks up a letter at their house addressed to "62 West Wallaby Street, Wigan". The address includes a postcode of WG7 3FU, though this does not match any street in the United Kingdom; Wigan postcodes begin with the letters WN. This address can be seen in the Cracking Contraptions episode "Shopper 13".

In the Cracking Contraptions episode "The Soccamatic", Wallace says to Gromit, "How do you like my Preston North End soccamatic, Gromit?". The episode references famous British footballers of the 1950s and 1960s, including Nobby Stiles, Tom Finney and Bill Shankly (all of whom played for Preston in their careers) as well as England's 1966 World Cup final hat-trick goalscorer Geoff Hurst and Blackpool's "wizard of dribble" Stanley Matthews.

The nostalgic quality of Wallace & Gromit's world has been compared to 1950s Beanotown.

== Filmography ==
=== Main series ===
Title	U.K. release date	Director(s)	Screenwriter(s)	Story by	Producer(s)
Short films
A Grand Day Out	4 November 1989	Nick Park	Nick Park and Steve Rushton		Rob Copeland
The Wrong Trousers	26 December 1993	Nick Park	Nick Park, Bob Baker and Brian Sibley		Christopher Moll
A Close Shave	24 December 1995	Nick Park	Bob Baker and Nick Park		Carla Shelley and Michael Rose
A Matter of Loaf and Death	25 December 2008	Nick Park	Nick Park and Bob Baker		Steve Pegram
Feature films
The Curse of the Were-Rabbit	7 October 2005	Nick Park and Steve Box	Nick Park, Steve Box, Mark Burton and Bob Baker		Claire Jennings, Carla Shelley, Peter Lord, David Sproxton and Nick Park
Vengeance Most Fowl	25 December 2024	Nick Park and Merlin Crossingham	Mark Burton	Nick Park and Mark Burton	Richard Beek

=== Spin-off films ===
Title	Original release/air date	Director(s)	Screenwriter(s)	Story by	Producer(s)
Short films
Timmy Time: Timmy's Christmas Surprise	12 December 2011				
Timmy Time: Timmy's Seaside Rescue	13 July 2012				
Shaun the Sheep: The Farmer's Llamas	26 December 2015	Jay Grace	Nick Vincent Murphy, Lee Pressman and Richard Starzak		Paul Kewley and John Woolley
Shaun the Sheep: The Flight Before Christmas	3 December 2021	Steve Cox	Mark Burton and Giles Pilbrow		
Feature films
Shaun the Sheep Movie	6 February 2015	Mark Burton and Richard Starzak			Paul Kewley and Julie Lockhart
A Shaun the Sheep Movie: Farmageddon	18 October 2019	Will Becher and Richard Phelan	Mark Burton and Jon Brown	Richard Starzak	Paul Kewley
Shaun the Sheep: The Beast of Mossy Bottom	18 September 2026	Steve Cox and Matthew Walker	Mark Burton and Giles Pilbrow		Richard Beek and Mark Burton
List indicator: An empty cell indicates the information is not available for the film.

=== Television series ===
Title	Originally aired		Series	Episodes
Title	First aired	Last aired	Series	Episodes
Main series
Wallace & Gromit's Cracking Contraptions	15 October 2002		1	10
Wallace & Gromit's World of Invention	3 November 2010	8 December 2010	1	6
Spin-offs
Shaun the Sheep	5 March 2007	present	6	170
Timmy Time	6 April 2009	13 July 2012	3	78
Shaun the Sheep 3D	7 March 2012	13 June 2012	1	15
Shaun The Sheep Championsheeps	2 July 2012	13 July 2012	1	21
Let’s Go Timmy	2027	TBD	1	0

== Box office and reception ==
=== Box office performance ===
Film	Budget	Box office gross			All time ranking		Ref(s).
Film	Budget	U.S. and Canada	Other territories	Worldwide	U.S. and Canada	Worldwide	Ref(s).
Wallace & Gromit: The Best of Aardman Animation†	$2 million	$1,002,002		$1,002,002	#9,098	#15,771	
Wallace & Gromit: The Curse of the Were-Rabbit	$30 million	$56,068,547	$141,524,605	$197,593,152	#1,663	#956	
Shaun the Sheep Movie	$25 million	$19,375,982	$91,264,032	$110,646,093	#3,946	#1,813	
A Shaun the Sheep Movie: Farmageddon	$25 million		$43,100,248	$43,100,248		#3,218	
Timmy's Cinema Adventure^			$84,581	$84,581		#23,697	
Timmy's Cinema Adventure: Christmas Edition^			$34,574	$34,574		#26,985	
Shaun the Sheep: The Flight Before Christmas			$2,027,525	$2,027,525			
Wallace & Gromit: Vengeance Most Fowl			$191,452	$191,452			
Shaun the Sheep: The Beast of Mossy Bottom		$3,169,645	$22,295,239	$25,464,884			
Total	$57 million	$79.6 million	$300.4 million	$380 million			
List indicators: TBA, To be ascertained.; A dark-grey cell indicates the information is not available for the film.; † U.S.-only, limited release; ^ UK-only, limited release

=== Critical and public reception ===
Film	Critical		Public
Film	Rotten Tomatoes	Metacritic	CinemaScore
A Grand Day Out	100% (23 reviews)		
The Wrong Trousers	100% (29 reviews)		
A Close Shave	100% (22 reviews)		
Wallace & Gromit: The Curse of the Were-Rabbit	95% (180 reviews)	87 (38 reviews)	B+
Shaun the Sheep Movie	99% (170 reviews)	81 (30 reviews)	B+
A Shaun the Sheep Movie: Farmageddon	96% (83 reviews)	79 (18 reviews)	
Wallace & Gromit: Vengeance Most Fowl	100% (138 reviews)	83 (31 reviews)	
Shaun the Sheep: The Beast of Mossy Bottom	99% (90 reviews)	80 (18 reviews)	
List indicator: A dark-grey cell indicates the information is not available for the film.

=== Academy Awards ===
Award	Main series						Spin-offs	
Award	A Grand Day Out	The Wrong Trousers	A Close Shave	The Curse of the Were-Rabbit	A Matter of Loaf and Death	Vengeance Most Fowl	Shaun the Sheep Movie	A Shaun the Sheep Movie: Farmageddon
Animated Short	Nominated	Won	Won		Nominated			
Animated Feature				Won		Nominated	Nominated	Nominated

== Production ==
=== Stop motion technique ===
The Wallace & Gromit films are shot using the stop motion animation technique. After detailed storyboarding, set and plasticine model construction, the films are shot one frame at a time, moving the models of the characters slightly to give the impression of movement in the final film. As is common with other animation techniques, the stop motion animation in Wallace & Gromit may duplicate frames if there is little motion, and in action scenes sometimes multiple exposures per frame are used to produce a faux motion blur. Because a second of film constitutes 24 separate frames, even a short half-hour film like A Close Shave takes a great deal of time to animate. General quotes on the speed of animation of a Wallace & Gromit film put the filming rate at typically around 30 frames per day per animator.

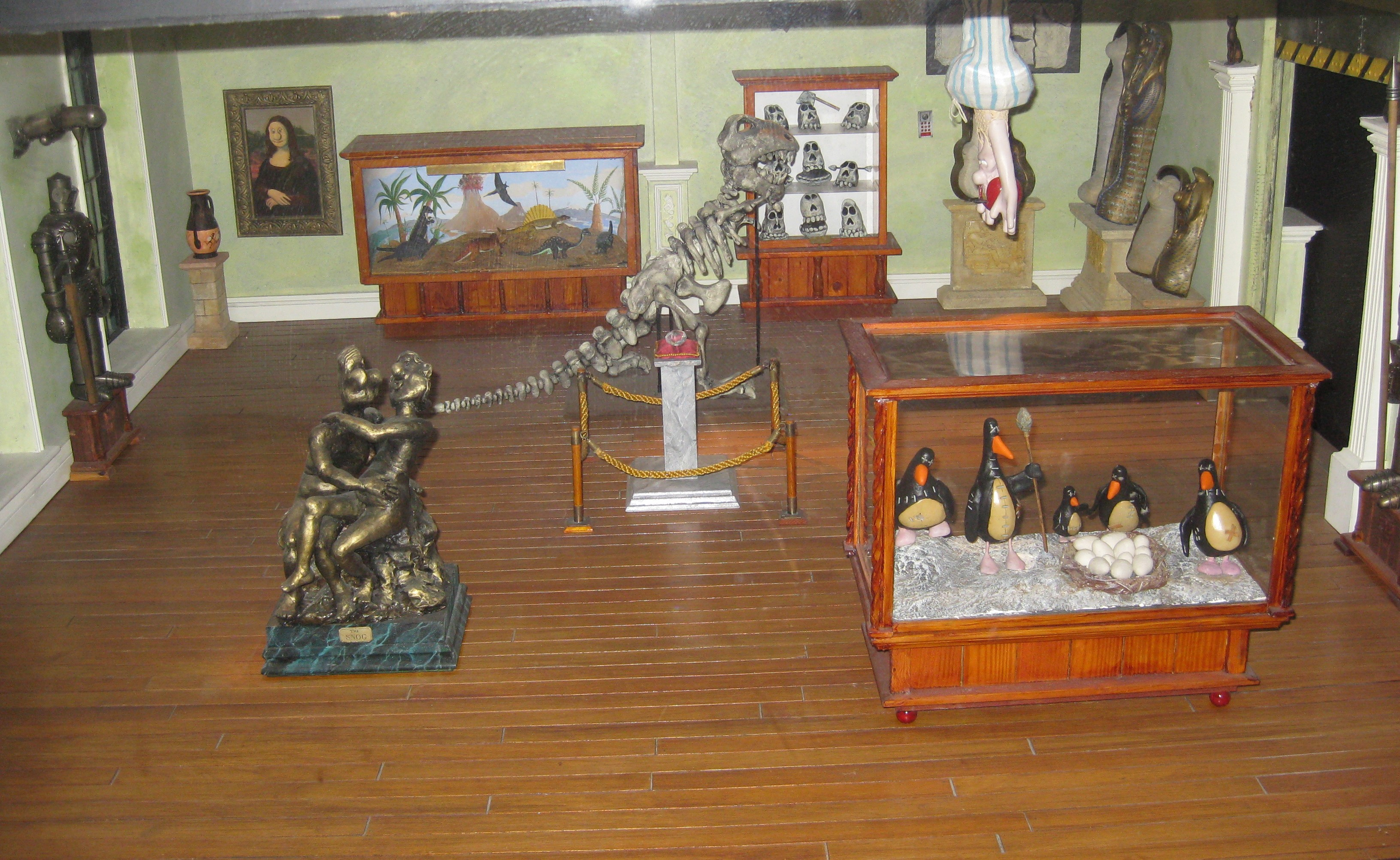
Museum set from The Wrong Trousers, on display at the National Media Museum in Bradford, West Yorkshire

Some effects, particularly the fire, smoke and floating bunnies in The Curse of the Were-Rabbit, proved impossible to create in stop motion and were rendered by computer animation specialists MPC film. MPC film studied the set for three months to create clay-like animation to match the stop-motion production. By paying close attention to detail, MPC was able to make the animated bunnies blend in with the clay bunnies. Adding imperfections such as fingerprints along with texture to the animated bunnies helped enhance the effect. MPC's collaboration resulted in over 700 effects to aid the film along with colouring to match the visuals.

Most models were destroyed in the 2005 Aardman studio fire, but some still exist, such as a small-scale model for the Cooker from A Grand Day Out and Feathers McGraw trapped in a bottle from The Wrong Trousers. The set and several props from the museum featured in the latter short film survived as well, as they were being kept at the National Science and Media Museum in Bradford, West Yorkshire, before the fire occurred. In 2008, a set from A Matter of Loaf and Death, which was produced after the fire, was displayed at the We The Curious science centre.

=== Music ===
The music featured in every film was written by British film composer Julian Nott. The theme song was used to wake up astronauts aboard space shuttle mission STS-132 in May 2010.

== Other media ==
=== Video games ===
A Wallace & Gromit interactive CD-ROM game from 1996, named Wallace & Gromit Fun Pack, was released for the PC, containing the Crackin' Compendium with three mini-games based on the three original animated shorts as well as brief video clips. The other program in the Fun Pack the Customise-O-Matic contained wallpapers, screen savers and sounds that could be assigned as system sounds. A sequel Fun Pack 2 was released in 2000 featuring enhanced graphics and two new games as well as a remake of the Great Train Game.

The characters were associated with a 144-issue fortnightly digest called Techno Quest, published by Eaglemoss Publications starting in 1997. It was designed to get children interested in science and technology.

In 1997, an animated screensaver themed video game entitled Wallace & Gromit Cracking Animator was released. Screensaver games were made by Dibase. Players could create their own multimedia animations through the collation of things like sound effects, sets, characters and props. Players could manipulate the facial movements of characters to synchronise their expressions with dialogue. Players could choose to make their finished creation their screensaver, or choose one of the pre-made screensaver games. The Boston Herald offered a rating of 2.5 stars, noting that creativity is limited.

In September 2003, Wallace & Gromit in Project Zoo was released for the PlayStation 2, Xbox, GameCube, and Microsoft Windows. This separate story sees the duo take on Feathers McGraw (of The Wrong Trousers) again. Still obsessed with diamonds, he escapes from the penguin enclosure of West Wallaby Zoo, where he was "imprisoned" at the end of The Wrong Trousers, and takes over the entire zoo, kidnapping young animals and forcing their parents to work for him, helping him turn the zoo into a diamond mine.

In 2005, a video game of The Curse of The Were-Rabbit was released for PlayStation 2 and Xbox, following the plot of the film as Wallace and Gromit work as vermin-catchers, protecting customers' vegetable gardens from rabbits, using a "BunGun". Gameplay for the Project Zoo involve players exclusively controlling Gromit, as Wallace functions as a helper non-player character, but in The Curse of the Were-Rabbit, gameplay shifts between the two, and includes two-player cooperative play. Both games were developed by Frontier Developments with the assistance of Aardman, with Peter Sallis reprising his role as Wallace. Project Zoo was published by BAM! Entertainment, while The Curse of the Were-Rabbit was published by Konami.

In July 2008, developer Telltale Games announced a new series of episodic video games based on the characters, called Wallace & Gromit's Grand Adventures. The first episode in Grand Adventures, "Fright of the Bumblebees", was released on 23 March 2009. The second episode, "The Last Resort", was released on 5 May 2009. Two more episodes, "Muzzled!" and "The Bogey Man", were released in later 2009. The four episodes have separately been released on Xbox Live Arcade for the Xbox 360.

A VR game titled Wallace & Gromit in The Grand Getaway was released for Meta Quest on December 7, 2023.

On 25 July 2024, a Wallace & Gromit-themed course was added to the virtual reality game Walkabout Mini Golf as downloadable content (DLC). A DLC pack based on the franchise was added to PowerWash Simulator on 4 March 2025.

==== List of video games ====
Title	Release date	Platform(s)
Main series
Wallace & Gromit Fun Pack	1996	PC
Wallace & Gromit Cracking Animator	1997	PC
Wallace & Gromit Print O Matic	1998	PC
Wallace & Gromit Fun Pack 2	1999	PC
Project Zoo	3 October 2003	PlayStation 2, GameCube, Xbox, Windows
The Curse of the Were-Rabbit	7 October 2005	PlayStation 2, Xbox, Mobile
Wallace & Gromit – The Curse of the Were Rabbit (Interactive DVD Game)	7 November 2005	DVD
Wallace & Gromit's Grand Adventures Episode 1: Fright of the Bumblebees	23 March 2009	PC, Xbox 360
Wallace & Gromit's Grand Adventures Episode 2: The Last Resort	5 May 2009	PC, Xbox 360, iOS
Wallace & Gromit's Grand Adventures Episode 3: Muzzled!	15 June 2009	PC, Xbox 360
Wallace & Gromit's Grand Adventures Episode 4: The Bogey Man	30 July 2009	PC, Xbox 360
Wallace & Gromit Adventures Java	2009	J2ME
Wallace & Gromit: The Big Fix up	18 January 2021	iOS, Android
The Grand Getaway	7 December 2023	Meta Quest 2 VR
Shaun the Sheep series
Shaun the Sheep	26 September 2008	Nintendo DS
Off His Head	23 October 2009	Nintendo DS
Home Sheep Home	2011	iOS
Home Sheep Home 2	2011	iOS
Shaun's Mossy Mole Mischief	June 2016	Wii U, Nintendo 3DS
Home Sheep Home: Farmageddon Party Edition	October 2019; 26 May 2023 (re-release)	Switch, Xbox One, Xbox Series X and Series S, PlayStation 4 & PlayStation 5
RollerCoaster Tycoon Touch – Shaun the Sheep	28 January 2021	iOS
Untitled The Sandbox game	TBA	iOS, Android
Timmy Time series
Timmy Time	19 August 2011	Nintendo DS

There are also several interactive games on the official Wallace & Gromit, Shaun the Sheep and Timmy Time websites.

=== Comic ===
British publisher Titan Magazines started producing a monthly Wallace & Gromit comic after the debut of Curse of the Were-Rabbit. The characters still run Anti-Pesto, and both Shaun and Feathers McGraw have appeared in the comic.

The two characters appeared in the monthly BeanoMAX comic until its closure in June 2013, and appeared every four weeks in The Beano. The strip was discontinued in 2015. They are heavily featured in 'Aardmag', the free online magazine that is unofficial but supported by Aardman Animations. Nick Park guest-edited the 70th birthday issue of The Beano weekly, and so this issue contained numerous Wallace & Gromit references.

On 17 May 2010, they began appearing daily in The Sun. It is credited to Titan and Aardman, with scripts written by Richy Chandler, Robert Etherington, Mike Garley, Ned Hartley, Rik Hoskin, David Leach, Luke Paton, J.P. Rutter, Rona Simpson and Gordon Volke, art by Sylvia Bennion, Jay Clarke, Jimmy Hansen, Viv Heath, Mychailo Kazybrid and Brian Williamson. It replaced George and Lynne. A graphic novel compiling all 311 daily strips was released on 8 October 2013, and a second volume followed on 4 November 2014. A third volume was released on 25 March 2015, and a fourth volume was released on 9 September 2015.

==== List of comics ====
Number	Title	Publisher	Run	Issues
1	Wallace & Gromit Comic	Titan Magazines	2005–07	26
2	Shaun the Sheep Comic	Titan Magazines	2007–08	19
3	Wallace & Gromit	D. C. Thomson & Co.	2013–15	—N/a
4	Wallace & Gromit	The Sun	2010–13	

List of graphic novels

- The Lost Slipper, 1997
- The Lost Slipper and Curse of the Ramsbottoms, 1998
- Anoraknophobia, 1998
- Crackers in Space, 1999
- A Grand Day Out, 1999
- Catch of the Day, 2002
- The Whippet Vanishes, 2004
- A Pier Too Far, 2004
- The Bootiful Game, 2005
- Plots in Space, 2007
- A Grand Day Out, 2009
- The Wrong Trousers, 2010
- The Complete Newspaper Comic Strips Collection, 2013
- The Complete Newspaper Comic Strips Collection, Volume 2, 2014
- The Complete Newspaper Comic Strips Collection, Volume 3, 2015
- The Complete Newspaper Comic Strips Collection, Volume 4, 2015

=== Theatre ===
In November 1997, the characters appeared in a play called Wallace And Gromit™ Alive on Stage in a Grand Night Out. This show featured Feathers McGraw escaping prison and hypnotising Wendolene to assist in his planned revenge on the duo, culminating in a showdown involving Shaun the Sheep donning the Techno-Trousers.

On 9 March 2011, Shaun the Sheep made its live theatre début in Shaun's Big Show. The 100-minute-long musical/dance show features all the regular characters, including Bitzer, Shirley and Timmy.

In 2015, Shaun starred in Snow White and the Seven Dwarfs pantomime at the Bristol Hippodrome.

== Additional crew ==
Film	Executive producer(s)	Composer	Editor
Wallace & Gromit: The Curse of the Were-Rabbit	Michael Rose and Cecil Kramer	Julian Nott	David McCormick and Gregory Perler
Shaun the Sheep Movie	Peter Lord, Nick Park, David Sproxton, Olivier Courson and Ron Halpern	Ilan Eshkeri	Sim Evan-Jones
A Shaun the Sheep Movie: Farmageddon	Mark Burton, Richard Starzak, Peter Lord, Nick Park, Carla Shelley, David Sproxton, Didier Lupfer and Ron Halpern	Tom Howe	Sim Evan-Jones
Wallace & Gromit: Vengeance Most Fowl	Peter Lord, Nick Park, Carla Shelley, Mark Burton and Sarah Cox	Lorne Balfe and Julian Nott	Dan Hembery
Shaun the Sheep: The Beast of Mossy Bottom	Sarah Cox, Peter Lord, Nick Park, Carla Shelley, Sean Clarke, Giles Pilbrow, Anna Marsh, Ron Halpern, Dan MacRae, Andrew Orr, Julia Stuart and Janay Carrott	Natalie Holt	Dan Hembery

== Promotional appearances ==
From c. 1998 – 2000, Wallace, Gromit and Shaun appeared in three advertisements for Glico Pucchin Pudding. Two of the adverts end with Shaun eating Wallace's pudding, to his dismay. In 2003, Aardman produced a cinematic commercial for the Renault Kangoo starring Wallace and Gromit. Later Wallace & Gromit commercials were made for Jacob's crackers, energy supplier Npower and tea beverage PG Tips.

The duo were used to promote a Harvey Nichols store that opened in Bristol (where Aardman is based) in 2008. The pictures show them, and Lady Tottington from Wallace & Gromit: The Curse of the Were-Rabbit, wearing designer clothes and items. They were used to prevent a Wensleydale cheese factory from shutting down because of financial difficulties after a member of staff came up with the idea of using Wallace and Gromit as mascots, as Wensleydale is one of Wallace's favourite cheeses.

On 28 March 2009, The Science Museum in London opened an exhibition called "Wallace & Gromit present a World of Cracking Ideas". The family-orientated show, open until 1 November 2009, hoped to inspire children to be inventive. Wallace and Gromit were featured in many exhibition-exclusive videos, as well as one announcing the opening of the exhibition.

Gromit Union Jack statue for the Platinum Jubilee of Elizabeth II in Cribbs Causeway shopping centre, Bristol, England in 2022

In December 2010, Wallace and Gromit featured on series of UK postage stamps issued by the Royal Mail for Christmas. The same month, Nick Park appeared on BBC Radio 4's Desert Island Discs and announced that he was working with Blackpool Pleasure Beach to build a theme park ride based on the characters. Wallace & Gromit's Thrill-O-Matic dark ride was opened by Park at Blackpool Pleasure Beach in 2013.

Wallace and Gromit appeared in a one-minute special for the Diamond Jubilee of Elizabeth II called Jubilee Bunt-a-thon. In 2012, Wallace and Gromit featured on an advert saying "Inventing For Britain" which was part of a poster campaign to promote British trade and business abroad in the year London hosted the Olympics.

In August 2012, they presented an edition of The BBC Proms, Wallace & Gromit's Musical Marvels, as Prom 20 of the 2012 season. Because of its popularity, Wallace & Gromit's Musical Marvels became a full touring show in 2013. It premièred at The Plenary in Melbourne, Australia on 9 February 2013. It was performed at other venues throughout 2013, with A Matter of Loaf and Death screened at each performance. In 2013 and 2014, the pair appeared in a nationwide TV, press and cinema campaign promoting the British government's "Holidays at Home are Great" directive, called Wallace & Gromit's Great UK Adventure.

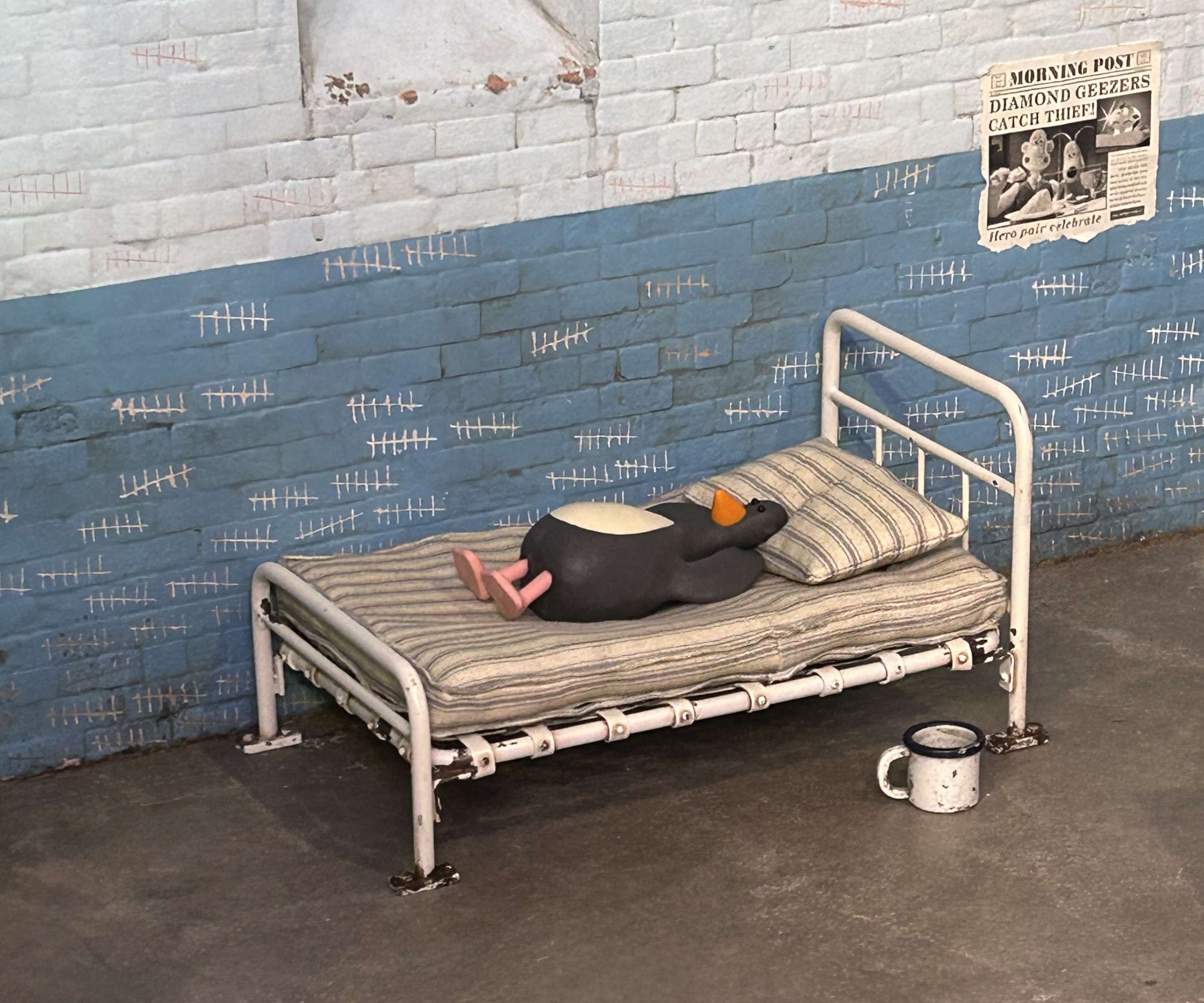
A model of Feathers McGraw in his cell from Wallace & Gromit: Vengeance Most Fowl (2024), on display in Bristol

In December 2019, Wallace & Gromit appeared in a DFS Furniture advert created by Krow to celebrate their 30th anniversary. Helena Bonham Carter reprised her role as Lady Tottington with new dialogue for the advert.

In 2024, Tyrells released limited-edition Wensleydale & Cranberry flavour crisps, exclusive to Co-op stores, to promote the film Vengeance Most Fowl. From 29 November to 31 December 2024, a six-minute Wallace & Gromit animation was projected onto London's Battersea Power Station every evening, as part of Apple's Shot on iPhone marketing campaign.

In 2025, Wallace & Gromit entered into a partnership with gravy brand Bisto. Characters from the films featured on Bisto products, with consumers offered the chance to win a lab-grown blue diamond worth £1,500. A pop-up gravy restaurant called "The Gravy Boat" also opened in Paddington, London, offering a gravy-themed three course menu and "meet and greet" opportunities for diners to meet Wallace, Gromit and Feathers McGraw.

Since 2025, Wallace and Gromit have appeared in Christmas television adverts for the British designer clothing and lifestyle brand Barbour.

== Charity ==
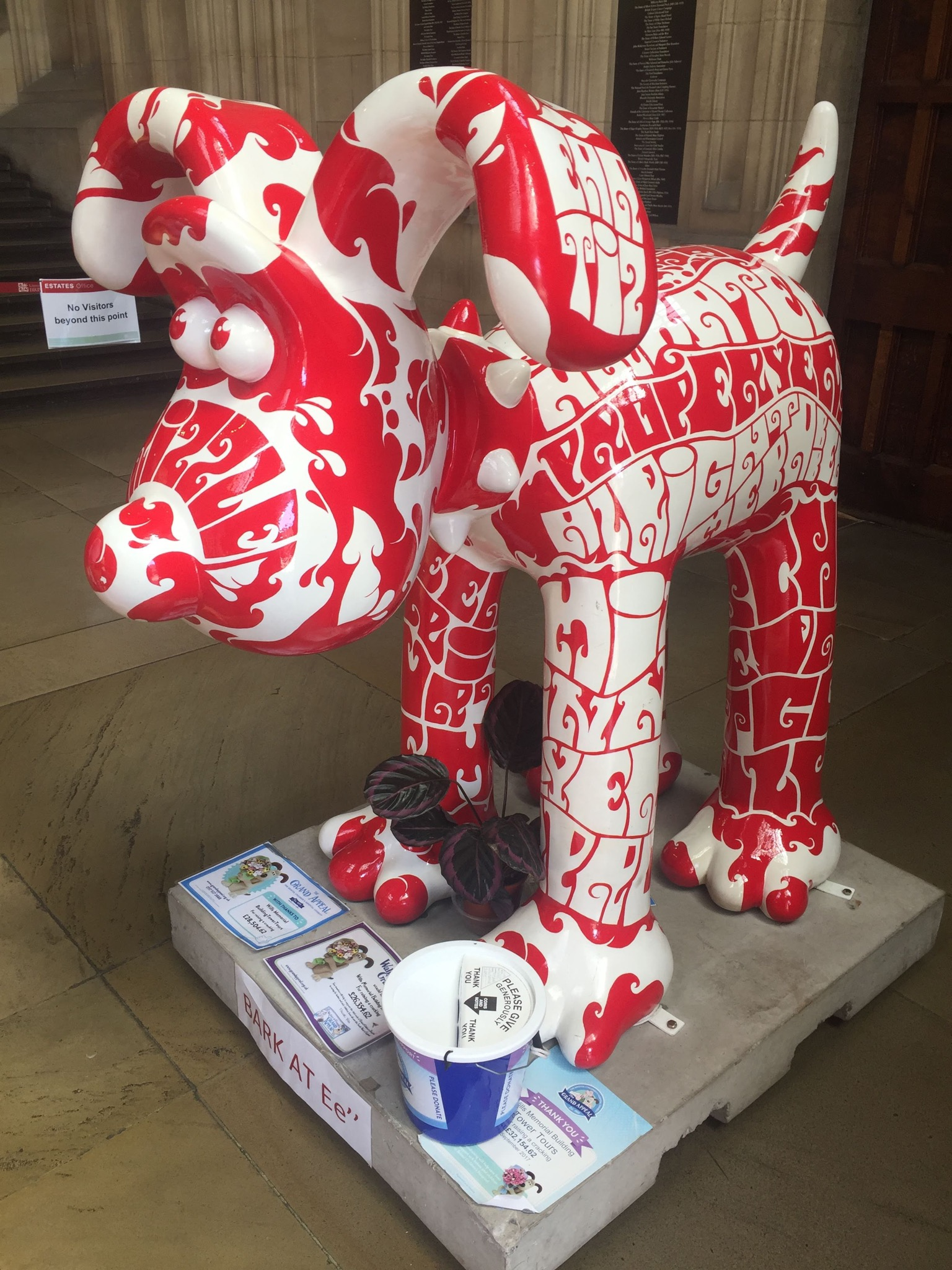
The "Bark at 'Ee" sculpture, one of 80 giant fibreglass sculptures of Gromit decorated for the Bristol Children's Hospital Charity

Wallace & Gromit spearheaded the fundraising for two children's charities: Wallace & Gromit's Children's Foundation, which supports children's hospices and hospitals in the United Kingdom, and Wallace & Gromit's Grand Appeal, the Bristol Children's Hospital Charity.

In July 2013, 80 giant fibreglass decorated sculptures of Gromit were distributed around Bristol as part of a Nick Park-inspired project to raise funds for the charity. The project was named Gromit Unleashed, and the sculptures were decorated by a range of artists and celebrities including Joanna Lumley, Sir Peter Blake, Trevor Baylis and Jools Holland. A similar project featuring Shaun the Sheep called Shaun in the City took place in 2015. Gromit Unleashed 2, also featuring Wallace and Feathers McGraw, took place in 2018. In 2020, Gromit Unleashed: The Grand Adventure in The Mall, Cribbs Causeway featured 15 sculptures of Wallace, Gromit, Shaun and Feathers. A further sculpture trail, Gromit Unleashed 3, adding Norbot (from Vengeance Most Fowl) to the line-up, took place in July and August 2025. The trail also featured a single Shaun the Sheep sculpture, "Wooly Capers", to celebrate the 30th anniversaries of the character and A Close Shave.

== Theme park ride ==
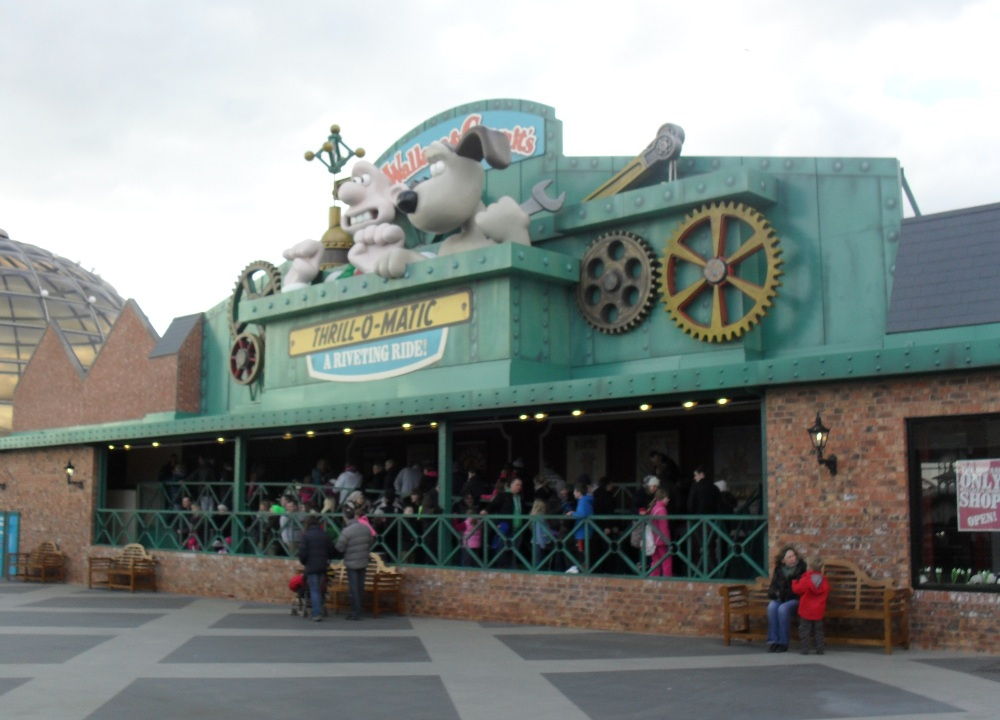
Wallace & Gromit's Thrill-O-Matic dark ride at Blackpool Pleasure Beach in Blackpool, Lancashire

A theme park ride called Wallace & Gromit's Thrill-O-Matic opened at Blackpool Pleasure Beach on 29 April 2013 by creator Nick Park, Amanda Thompson, Nick Thompson, Nick Farmer and Merlin Crossingham.

The ride, which cost £5.25 million to make, was created by Blackpool Pleasure Beach design in association with Aardman Animations. The cars on the ride are designed on one of Wallace's slippers, so that, when a rider is seated, it is as if they are sitting inside a large slipper. The ride lasts almost four minutes, and features scenes from A Grand Day Out, The Wrong Trousers, A Close Shave, The Curse of the Were-Rabbit and A Matter of Loaf and Death along with some archive audio and some newly recorded lines from Ben Whitehead as the voice of Wallace.

== Spin-offs ==
=== Shaun the Sheep (2007–present) ===
In 2007, a spin-off series Shaun the Sheep was created for the character of Shaun, first introduced in 1995's A Close Shave. In the series, Shaun lives with his flock at Mossy Bottom Farm, a traditional small northern English farm. In each episode, their latest attempt to add excitement to their dull mundane life as livestock somehow snowballs into a fantastic sitcom-style escapade, most often with the help of their fascination with human doings and devices. This usually brings them into conflict – and often into partnership – with the farm sheepdog Bitzer, while they all are simultaneously trying to avoid discovery by the Farmer. Following the success of the series, two series of 1-minute shorts were created – Mossy Bottom Shorts and Championsheeps – followed by a television special The Farmer's Llamas (2015) and two feature films, Shaun the Sheep Movie (2015) and A Shaun the Sheep Movie: Farmageddon (2019). A third feature film, Shaun the Sheep: The Beast of Mossy Bottom, is scheduled for a theatrical release in 2026.

=== Timmy Time (2009–12) ===
In 2009, a spin-off of Shaun the Sheep, Timmy Time, was created centring on the character of the same name. In the series, Timmy and his friends have to learn to share, make friends and accept their mistakes. They are supervised by two teachers, Harriet the Heron and Osbourne the Owl. The show is aimed at pre-school-aged children which the company described as "a natural step for Aardman".
