= Wallace & Gromit: A Matter of Loaf and Death =

2008 animated short film by Nick Park

- North American DVD cover art
- Directed by: Nick Park
- Written by: Nick Park; Bob Baker
- Produced by: Steve Pegram
- Starring: Peter Sallis; Sally Lindsay
- Cinematography: Dave Alex Riddett
- Edited by: David McCormick
- Music by: Julian Nott
- Production company: Aardman Animations
- Distributed by: BBC Worldwide
- Release dates: December 3, 2008 (ABC1); December 25, 2008 (BBC One)
- Running time: 29 minutes
- Country: United Kingdom
- Budget: £3 million

Wallace & Gromit: A Matter of Loaf and Death is a 2008 British stop motion animated short film directed by Nick Park and written by Park and Bob Baker. The fifth installment in the Wallace & Gromit series and the first short film since A Close Shave (1995), it was the last Wallace & Gromit film before the retirement of Wallace's voice actor, Peter Sallis, in 2010. In the film, Wallace and Gromit operate a bakery as the former is targeted by a serial killer. Sally Lindsay co-stars as its main antagonist, Piella Bakewell.

In October 2007, it was announced that a new Wallace & Gromit short film was in production at Aardman Animations. Originally titled Trouble At' Mill, It was one of the studio's first works produced after the end of their feature film deal with DreamWorks Animation. Filming began in January 2008 with production lasting signifcantly shorter than past installments and Aardman features.

A Matter of Loaf and Death premiered on BBC One on December 25, 2008 and was one of the most watched television specials in the United Kingdom that year. It received critical acclaim and an Academy Award nomination for Best Animated Short Film at the 82nd Academy Awards, whilst winning a BAFTA and an Annie Award for Best Short Animation and Best Animated Short Subject in 2009. A sixth installment, Vengeance Most Fowl, was released sixteen years later in 2024.

== Plot ==
As word spreads about the latest of twelve bakers having been murdered by a serial killer, Wallace and Gromit, while on a delivery for their new bakery business, rescue Piella Bakewell, a former pin-up model for the Bake-O-Lite bread company, when the brakes on her bicycle seemingly fail. Wallace becomes smitten with Piella and begins a romance with her; Gromit becomes suspicious when he tests the bicycle's brakes to see them working fine and is infuriated when she redecorates their house, but shares a sensitive moment with her nervous poodle Fluffles as she returns his discarded possessions.

Wallace sends Gromit to return Piella's forgotten purse that night. At her residence, Gromit discovers evidence that implicates Piella as the serial killer. It is revealed that she came to detest bakers after her weight gain ended her career; Wallace is her planned thirteenth victim, completing a "baker's dozen". When Gromit attempts to show Wallace some of the evidence, he is too distracted by his engagement to Piella to listen as she disposes of it.

Gromit remains determined to protect his owner, but Piella eventually keeps him at bay by deceiving Wallace into wrongfully punishing him. Gromit proceeds to watch helplessly as she prepares to assassinate Wallace, but he is soon saved when Piella is miraculously deterred at the last second. Following an angry outburst over the failure that nearly exposes her true nature, she leaves a crestfallen Wallace, but later returns to "apologise" with a cake, with Fluffles absent from her side. A suspicious Gromit infiltrates her residence, where Piella captures him, reveals that the cake contains a bomb and detains him with Fluffles.

Escaping in Piella's old Bake-O-Lite hot air balloon, Gromit and Fluffles arrive at the scene as Wallace lights the bomb's fuse and, following a struggle, its true colours are revealed. Wallace and Gromit are then confronted by Piella, but just as she is about to dispatch the former, Fluffles opposes her using the duo's forklift. In the chaos, the bomb ends up in Wallace's trousers, but Gromit and Fluffles manage to neutralise its explosion as Piella escapes in her balloon. However, her weight drags the balloon down into the local zoo, where she is eaten alive by its crocodile. Gromit tries to console Fluffles and offers her to stay with them, but she leaves on account of the tragedy. When Wallace and Gromit decide to take their minds off things with a delivery, they find Fluffles waiting outside as she joins them.

== Cast ==
- Peter Sallis as Wallace
- Sally Lindsay as Piella Bakewell
- Melissa Collier as the vocal effects of Fluffles
- Sarah Laborde as the singer for the Bake-O-Lite company's advertising
- Geraldine McEwan as Miss Thripp, reprising her role from Wallace & Gromit: The Curse of the Were-Rabbit.
- Ben Whitehead as Baker Bob

== Production ==
In October 2007, it was announced that Wallace and Gromit were to return to television after an absence of ten years with a new short film titled Wallace & Gromit: Trouble At' Mill. Filming began in January 2008; creator Nick Park commented that the production period for the short was significantly quicker than that of the feature-length films Chicken Run and The Curse of the Were-Rabbit, which each took five years to complete. A Matter of Loaf and Death was the first Aardman film to be made using the software Stop-Motion Pro. Five models were created for Gromit alone, with scenes being shot simultaneously on thirteen sets.

Commenting on the fact that the short would be made directly for a British audience, Nick Park said: "I don't feel like I'm making a film for a kid in some suburb of America — and being told they're not going to understand a joke, or a northern saying." Regardless, Park changed the title from Trouble at Mill as he thought it was too obscure for a Northern England colloquialism. As well as a final title that references A Matter of Life and Death, the film additionally references Ghost (1990), Batman (1966) and Aliens (1986).

Park said in an interview with the Radio Times: "The BBC hardly gave a single note or instruction on the whole thing", and Park goes on to remark how it was better than his previous work with DreamWorks Animation, Curse of the Were-Rabbit, where they kept receiving calls to change critical things.

Park cast Sally Lindsay after hearing her on the Radcliffe and Maconie Show on BBC Radio 2 whilst driving from Preston. Although unfamiliar with her role as Shelley Unwin in Coronation Street, Park said: "Sally has a lot of fun in her voice, flamboyant almost, and I was also looking for someone who could be quite charming too, but with a slightly posh northern accent. Piella needed to at times sound well to do, and then at others sound quite gritty". A Matter of Loaf and Death was the last Wallace & Gromit film before the retirement of Wallace's voice actor, Peter Sallis, in 2010.

== Release ==
A Matter of Loaf and Death debuted on ABC1 in Australia on 3 December 2008, and was repeated the following day on ABC2. In the UK, it debuted on Christmas Day at 20:30 on BBC One with over 14 million people watching, although it had been available on filesharing website the Pirate Bay since 3 December 2008. On 19 December 2008, Aardman Animations revealed they had "no idea" of how clips were leaked onto YouTube ahead of its screening in the UK.

In France, A Matter of Loaf & Death (Sacré pétrin in French) was shown – dubbed into French – on Christmas Eve 2008, on M6. In Germany, one version, entitled Auf Leben und Brot was broadcast on the Super RTL network; the title is a play on Auf Leben und Tod, meaning a matter of life and death.

In a similar style to A Close Shave, Wallace & Gromit became the theme for BBC One's Christmas idents for 2008 to promote the showing of A Matter of Loaf and Death. These idents led Russell T. Davies to request similar idents for Doctor Who the following year.

== Reception ==
The programme was watched by the most viewers of any programme on Christmas Day 2008 in the United Kingdom and secured the largest Christmas Day audience in five years. It was also the most-watched programme in the United Kingdom in 2008, with a peak average audience of 14.4 million. The programme had a share of 53.3%, peaking with 58.1% and 15.88 million at the end of the programme.

The repeat showing on New Year's Day 2009 managed 7.2 million, beating ITV's Emmerdale in the ratings. The short was shown on British television for the third time on Good Friday 2009, pulling in 3.4 million viewers. In BARB's official ratings published on 8 January 2009, it showed that A Matter of Loaf and Death had 16.15 million, making it the highest-rated programme of 2008, and the highest-rated non-sporting event in the United Kingdom since 2004, when an episode of Coronation Street garnered 16.3 million.

Linehan gave a positive review, feeling the film was "not quite as ambitious as the full-featured Curse of the Were-Rabbit but it's more than enough". Writing for The Guardian, Euan Ferguson described the film as "a bubbling, punning, clockwork piece of magnificence". Laurence Perry applauded the film. A positive review came from USA Today, which gave the film four stars.

One reviewer noted the death and themes presented in the film, feeling "there's a definite, if slight, shift in Loaf And Death towards showing Park's dark side: like the best family films, when it needs to be scary it's not afraid to be, providing some heart stopping thrills amongst the comedy." A. O. Scott of The New York Times called the film a half-hour tour de force return for Wallace & Gromit and said that the film stands out among all ten Oscar-nominated short films of the year 2009. Giovanni Fazio of The Japan Times praised A Matter of Loaf and Death as a brilliant continuation of the franchise.

=== Awards ===
Won

- 2009 – BAFTA Award – Best Short Animation
- 2009 – Annie Award – Best Animated Short Subject

Nominated

- 2010 – Academy Award – Best Animated Short Film
