= List of accolades received by Shaun the Sheep Movie =

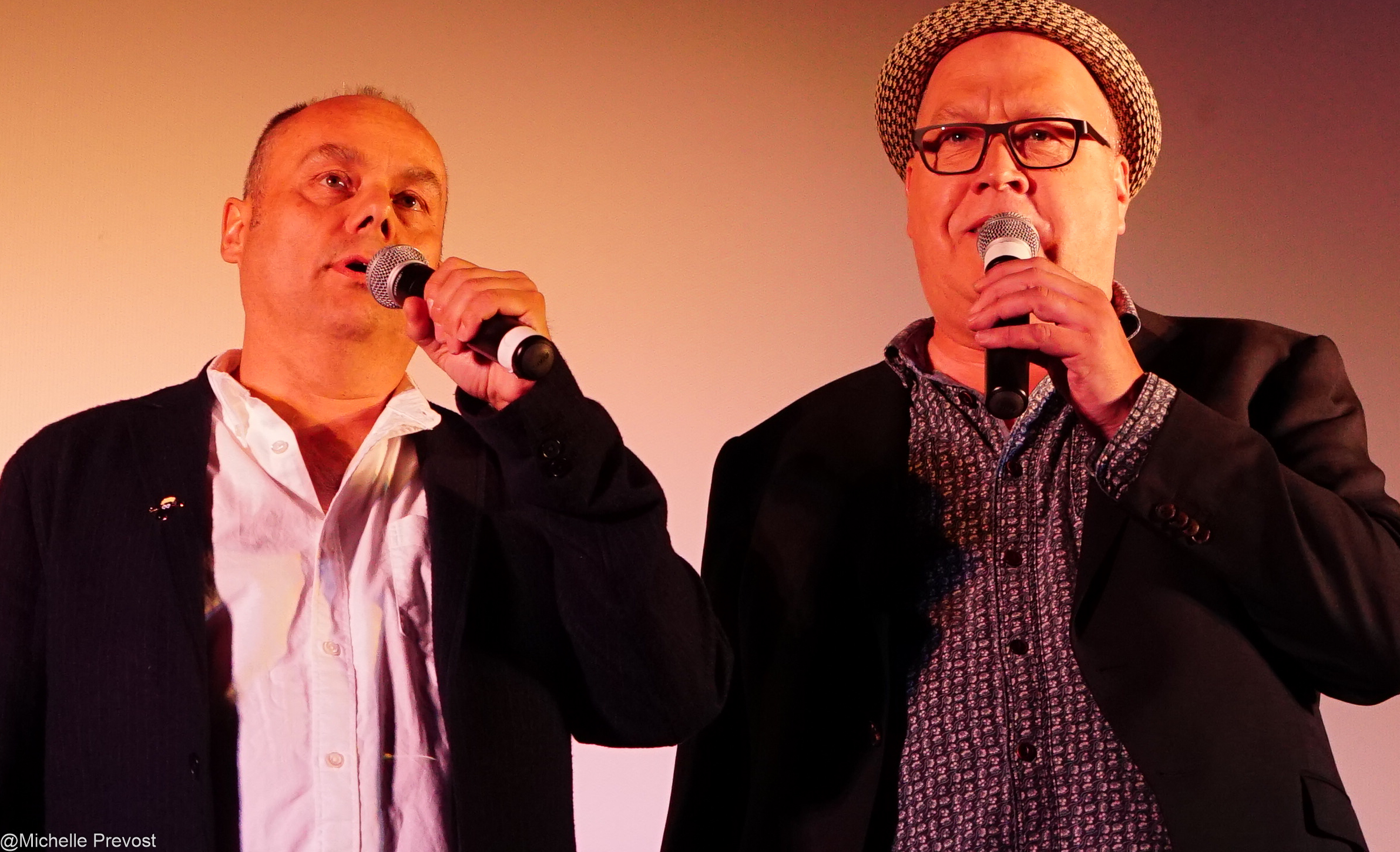
- Mark Burton and Richard Starzak, directors and writers of the film received positive reviews for their direction and writing
Awards & nominations
Award	Won	Nominated	Standing
Academy Awards	0	1
Alliance of Women Film Journalists	0	1
Annie Awards	0	5
Anima Mundi (event)	1	1
Austin Film Critics Association Awards	0	1
Boston Society of Film Critics	0	1	2nd Place
British Academy Children's Award	0	2
British Academy Film Awards	0	1
Chicago Film Critics Association Awards	0	1
Critics' Choice Movie Awards	1	1
Denver Film Critics Society	0	2
Empire Awards	0	1
Florida Film Critics Circle Awards	0	1
Golden Globe Awards	0	1
2016 Gold Derby Awards	0	1
Golden Reel Awards	0	1
Golden Trailer Awards 2015	1	1
Golden Space Needle Award	0	1	4th Place
Houston Film Critics Society Awards	0	1
Hollywood Music in Media Awards	0	1
London Film Critics' Circle	0	1
Movieguide Awards	0	1
New York Film Critics Online Awards	0	1
Nantucket Film Festival	0	1	3rd Place
Online Film Critics Society	0	1
San Diego Film Critics Society	0	1
San Francisco Film Critics Circle Awards	0	1
Satellite Awards	0	1
Seattle International Film Festival	0	2	Third Runner-up
St. Louis Gateway Film Critics Association Awards	0	2
Toronto Film Critics Association	1	1
Village Voice Film Poll	0	1	3rd Place
Visual Effects Society Awards	0	1
Washington D.C. Area Film Critics Association	0	1
Women Film Critics Circle Awards	0	1
- Total number of awards and nominations (Note: Certain award groups do not simply award one winner. They recognize several different recipients and have runners-up. Since this is a specific recognition and is different from losing an award, runner-up mentions are considered wins in this award tally.)
Totals	9	51
- Footnotes

Shaun the Sheep Movie is a 2015 British stop-motion animated adventure comedy film based on the Shaun the Sheep television series by Nick Park. It was written and directed by Mark Burton and Richard Starzak.

Shaun the Sheep Movie was well-received, with an approval rating of 99% on the review aggregator Rotten Tomatoes. The film was nominated for the Academy Award for Best Animated Feature at the 88th Academy Awards. It also received five nominations at the 43rd Annie Awards, including Outstanding Achievement in Directing in an Animated Feature Production for Burton and Starzak, Writing in an Animated Feature Production (also for Burton and Starzak), and Best Animated Feature. The film won in the Toronto Film Critics Association Awards for Best Animated Feature, and was also nominated for Best Animated Feature at the 73rd Golden Globe Awards and the 69th British Academy Film Awards.

== Awards and nominations ==
Award	Category	Nominee	Result
88th Academy Awards	Academy Award for Best Animated Feature	Shaun the Sheep Movie	Nominated
Anima Mundi Animation Festival	Best Animated Feature	Shaun the Sheep Movie	Won
43rd Annie Awards	Writing in an Animated Feature Production	Mark Burton and Richard Starzak	Nominated
43rd Annie Awards	Directing in an Animated Feature Production	Mark Burton and Richard Starzak	Nominated
43rd Annie Awards	Best Animated Feature	Julie Lockhart and Paul Kewley	Nominated
43rd Annie Awards	Production Design in an Animated Feature Production	Matt Perry and Gavin Lines	Nominated
43rd Annie Awards	Editorial in an Animated Feature Production	Sim Evan-Jones	Nominated
Alliance of Women Film Journalists Awards	Best Animated Film	Shaun the Sheep Movie	Nominated
Austin Film Critics Association Awards	Best Animated Film	Shaun the Sheep Movie	Nominated
Boston Society of Film Critics Awards 2015	Best Animated Film	Shaun the Sheep Movie	2nd Place
69th British Academy Film Awards	Best Animated Film	Mark Burton and Richard Starzak	Nominated
British Academy Children's Awards	BAFTA Kids' Vote - Feature Film	Mark Burton and Richard Starzak	Nominated
British Academy Children's Awards	Feature Film	Mark Burton, Richard Starzak, Julie Lockhart and Paul Kewley	Nominated
Chicago Film Critics Association Awards	Best Animated Film	Mark Burton and Richard Starzak	Nominated
Critics' Choice Movie Awards	Best Animated Film	Mark Burton and Richard Starzak	Nominated
Critics' Choice Movie Awards	Special Achievement Award for the 2015 Critics' Choice Award	Shaun the Sheep Movie	Won
European Film Awards	European Animated Feature Film	Shaun the Sheep Movie	Nominated
21st Empire Awards	Best Animated Film	Shaun the Sheep Movie	Nominated
Florida Film Critics Circle Awards	Best Animated Film	Shaun the Sheep Movie	Nominated
73rd Golden Globe Awards	Best Animated Film	Mark Burton and Richard Starzak	Nominated
Golden Goblet	Best Animation	Mark Burton and Richard Starzak	Nominated
Golden Space Needle Award	Best Film	Mark Burton and Richard Starzak	4th Place
Golden Reel Awards	Best Sound Editing: Sound Effects, Foley, Dialogue & ADR in an Animation Feature Film	Anthony Bayman and Adrian Rhodes	Nominated
Golden Trailer Awards 2015	Best Foreign Animation Family Trailer	New Hero	Won
Houston Film Critics Society Awards	Best Animated Feature	Shaun the Sheep Movie	Nominated
Hollywood Music in Media Awards	Original Song - Animated Film	Feels Like Summer - Ilan Eshkeri, Nick Hodgson and Tim Wheeler	Nominated
Jerusalem Film Festival	Cinematheque Young Critics Club Award for Best Children's Film	Mark Burton and Richard Starzak	Nominated
Movieguide Awards	Best Movie for Families	Shaun the Sheep Movie	Nominated
New York Film Critics Online Awards	Best Animated Feature	Shaun the Sheep Movie	Nominated
Nantucket Film Festival	Audience Award for Best Narrative Feature	Mark Burton and Richard Starzak	2nd Place
London Film Critics' Circle	Breakthrough British/Irish Filmmaker of the Year	Mark Burton and Richard Starzak	Nominated
Online Film Critics Society Awards	Best Animated Film	Shaun the Sheep Movie	Nominated
Seattle International Film Festival	Golden Space Needle Award	Mark Burton and Richard Starzak	Third Runner-up
Seattle International Film Festival	Films4Families Youth Jury Award	Mark Burton and Richard Starzak	Nominated
San Francisco Film Critics Circle Awards	Best Animated Feature	Shaun the Sheep Movie	Nominated
St. Louis Gateway Film Critics Association Awards	St. Louis Gateway Film Critics Association Award for Best Animated Film	Shaun the Sheep Movie	Nominated
St. Louis Gateway Film Critics Association Awards	Best Original Song	Feels Like Summer - Ilan Eshkeri, Nick Hodgson and Tim Wheeler	Nominated
San Diego Film Critics Society Awards	Best Animated Film	Shaun the Sheep Movie	Nominated
Satellite Awards	Best Motion Picture, Animated or Mixed Media	Shaun the Sheep Movie	Nominated
Toronto Film Critics Association Awards	Best Animated Film	Mark Burton and Richard Starzak	Won
Washington D.C. Area Film Critics Association	Best Animated Feature	Mark Burton and Richard Starzak	Nominated
Visual Effects Society Awards	Outstanding Created Environment in an Animated Feature	Matt Perry, Charles Comping, Alfred Llupia Perez and Andy Brown (Under the Arches)	Nominated
