= List of Shaun the Sheep episodes and films =

The following is an episode list for Aardman Animations' animated comedy children's television series, Shaun the Sheep, in chronological order of first airing on BBC One and CBBC in the United Kingdom, Kika (starting in 2020) in Germany and Netflix (series 6) worldwide.

== Series overview ==
=== Regular series ===
Series	Episodes	Originally released		
Series	Episodes	First released	Last released	Network
1	40	5 March 2007	14 September 2007	BBC One
2	40	23 November 2009	17 December 2010	BBC One
3	20	26 November 2012	20 December 2012	CBBC
4	30	3 February 2014	19 December 2014	CBBC
Films	3	6 February 2015	18 September 2026	BBC; Netflix
Specials		26 December 2015	3 December 2021	BBC; Netflix
5	20	5 September 2016	18 November 2016	BBC; Netflix
6	20	16 March 2020		Netflix
7	20	24 May 2025	1 December 2025	CBBC

=== Special series ===
Series	Episodes	Originally released	
Series	Episodes	First released	Last released
Shaun the Sheep 3D (Mossy Bottom Shorts)
1	15	7 March 2012	13 June 2012
Shaun the Sheep Championsheeps
2	21	2 July 2012	30 July 2012

== Episodes ==
=== Series 1 (2007) ===
Series 1 utilized single frame recording with an SDTV professional video camera to create the animation.

No. overall	No. in season	Title	Directed by	Written by	Storyboard by	Original release date	Prod. code
1	1	"Off the Baa!"	Christopher Sadler	Ian Carney	David Vinicombe	5 March 2007	101
A cabbage rolls onto the lawn, and a game of football breaks out. Things get worse when the pigs want it for lunch.
2	2	"Bathtime"	Christopher Sadler	Richard "Golly" Goleszowski & Rob Dudley	J.P. Vine	5 March 2007	103
Shaun and his gang of sheep try to steal all the hot water from the Farmer's house to have a nice warm sheep dip.
3	3	"Shape Up with Shaun"	Christopher Sadler	Lee Pressman	J.P. Vine	6 March 2007	107
Shirley grows heavier, and Shaun and the flock do their best to help her lose weight. Just when their method seems to be improving her weight, an accident with Timmy and a tractor launches Shirley into a pie lorry—and back to her fat, weighty state.
4	4	"Timmy in a Tizzy"	Richard Webber	Julie Jones	Gareth Owen and Rob Richards	6 March 2007	109
The Farmer steals Timmy's teddy bear for himself, unaware of its real owner. Timmy can't stop screaming about it, so Shaun and the flock team up to get it back.
5	5	"Scrumping"	David Osmand	Sarah Ball	Jason Comley	7 March 2007	114
The flock wants some apples from the greedy pigs, but the latter are determined to stop them at all costs.
6	6	"Still Life"	Christopher Sadler	Ian Carney	J.P. Vine	7 March 2007	116
The Farmer oil paints the farm on a canvas, but runs out of white paint for the sheep. When he leaves to get more, Bitzer accidentally smudges the painting. Shaun tries to help, and soon the flock clashes with her own artistic styles, ruining the painting ultimately. Although it appears ruined, it proves to be a fortune-making work in the end.
7	7	"Mower Mouth"	Richard Webber	Glenn Dakin	J.P. Vine	8 March 2007	110
An eager goat eats everything in sight, very similar to Shirley. He accidentally breaks free, and takes Shaun on an impromptu ride around the farm.
8	8	"Take Away"	Christopher Sadler	Richard "Golly" Goleszowski & Rob Dudley	David Vinicombe and Eve Coy	8 March 2007	111
After observing the Farmer ordering pizza, Shaun and the flock try to get some of their own by posing as a human and going to the town to buy some.
9	9	"The Bull"	Richard Webber	Trevor Ricketts	Jason Comley	9 March 2007	105
Shaun learns that the Bull in the Farmer's field attacks anything that is coloured red. The mischievous pigs stir up chaos by painting the flock red, by colouring the sheep dip. Shaun has to clean up the mess and save his friends from the Bull's anger.
10	10	"Saturday Night Shaun"	Christopher Sadler	Julie Jones	Sylvia Bennion	9 March 2007	115
Shaun uses the Farmer's old record player for a dance party, but the pigs interfere with the party by playing drum and bass music. Meanwhile, the Farmer attempts to get his new music player to work, but has trouble.
11	11	"The Kite"	Christopher Sadler	Richard "Golly" Goleszowski & Rob Dudley	Sylvia Bennion	12 March 2007	106
A kite flies into the sheep's field, but gets stuck in a tree. Shaun and the flock work to get it down.
12	12	"Little Sheep of Horrors"	Christopher Sadler	Lee Pressman	Rob Richards	12 March 2007	113
Timmy ventures into the Farmer's house to watch a horror movie. The sheep work together to retrieve Timmy without the Farmer knowing, while Bitzer scrambles after them. As soon as the Farmer knows, he's in for real horror.
13	13	"Buzz Off Bees"	Christopher Sadler	Julie Jones	Jason Comley	13 March 2007	108
Shaun, Bitzer and the flock encounter a hive of bees, which they attempt to outwit.
14	14	"Fleeced"	Christopher Sadler	Charles Hodges	David Vinicombe and Rob Richards	13 March 2007	120
It's haircut day for the flock, but the Farmer's styling techniques scare the flock to flee the barn and plan a mission to reach the salon downtown, for a true makeover.
15	15	"Shaun Shoots the Sheep"	David Osmand	Lee Pressman	David Vinicombe	14 March 2007	119
Shaun finds a camera left by some campers, and snaps away with it, but Bitzer and the pigs have other plans.
16	16	"Big Top Timmy"	Richard Webber	Lee Pressman	Gareth Owen and Rob Richards	14 March 2007	104
One night, a fascinated Timmy ventures out to the circus. The next day, Shaun and the flock search the circus and try to keep him from harm, while the Farmer wonders where his sheep went.
17	17	"Fetching"	Richard Webber	Richard "Golly" Goleszowski & Rob Dudley	David Vinicombe	15 March 2007	102
When Bitzer meets the love of his life, a female dog, he gets distracted from his duties and hangs out with her.
18	18	"Mountains Out of Molehills"	David Osmand	Ian Carney	J.P. Vine	15 March 2007	112
The flock's dancing is interrupted by a naughty mole. Shaun and the flock try escalating tactics to catch him.
19	19	"Who's the Mummy?"	David Osmand	Trevor Ricketts	Charles Hodges	16 March 2007	118
A quartet of chick hatchlings bonds to Shaun, thinking he's their mother, and they relentlessly follow him around. Shaun initially can't get rid of them fast enough, but when their mother shows up, he has to save their lives. Note: There are (at least) two versions of this episode, showing different phone numbers on the 'wanted' poster that the chicks' mother has made to find her eggs.
20	20	"Things That Go Bump"	David Osmand	Glenn Dakin	Eve Coy	16 March 2007	117
Halloween pranks in the night disturb the flock's sleep. Shaun investigates, and the culprits are soon discovered.
21	21	"Abracadabra"	Darren Walsh	Richard "Golly" Goleszowski & Rob Dudley	Christopher Sadler	3 September 2007	140
When the Farmer decides to throw out his magic set, Shaun decides to put on a show, but things get out of hand when the flock starts disappearing.
22	22	"Sheep on the Loose"	Mike Mort	Sarah Ball	TBA	3 September 2007	121
When the flock nips off on the bus to the local amusement park, Shaun fears that the Farmer will find out. He tries to hide the fact from the Farmer while Bitzer rushes off to the fair to round up the lost sheep and get them back to the farm.
23	23	"Washday"	Jay Grace	Charles Hodges	Rob Richards	4 September 2007	124
The sheep use the Farmer's clotheshorse as a merry-go-round. The garments get dirty and have to be washed (and then sewn back together) before the Farmer returns.
24	24	"The Visitor"	Lee Wilton	Trevor Ricketts	Sylvia Bennion	4 September 2007	136
One night, a spacecraft out of fuel crash-lands in the farm. Shaun and the flock help its occupant, the one-eyed, green alien, get airborne again.
25	25	"Shaun the Farmer"	Andrew Symanowski	Sarah Ball	David Vinicombe	5 September 2007	130
The Farmer is ill in bed, with Bitzer playing nurse-maid. He gives Shaun the job of handling the daily chores around the farm, while sneaking off to raid the fridge for snacks and play video games.
26	26	"Tooth Fairy"	Jay Grace	Sara Barbas	Sylvia Bennion and J.P. Vine	5 September 2007	127
Bitzer gets a painful toothache; Shaun takes the job as a dentist but is unable to get the rotten tooth out. After a successful extraction at the vet, Bitzer hopes the Tooth Fairy will give him a coin. Instead, the Fairy leaves him a toothbrush and toothpaste.
27	27	"Bitzer Puts His Foot in It"	Jay Grace	Lee Pressman	Rob Richards	6 September 2007	122
The Farmer has Bitzer guard some freshly laid concrete. Things go wrong, however, when Shaun and the flock use it as the Hollywood Walk of Fame and they must work to fix the mess.
28	28	"Hiccups"	Mike Mort	Charles Hodges	TBA	6 September 2007	123
Shirley drinks Bitzer's bottle of juice too fast and gets the hiccups. Shaun tries to help with all of the usual tricks, but none of them work. Eventually, Shirley's hiccups are cured by an unlikely sight: witnessing the naked Farmer's buttocks.
29	29	"If You Can't Stand the Heat"	Andy Symanowski	James Cary	Rob Richards and David Vinicombe	7 September 2007	134
It is a scorching hot day, and the flock is desperate to cool down in the sheep dip, but the sunbathing Farmer and Bitzer block their way, with the latter not allowing the sheep to. The sheep, however, are determined to get the dip to themselves.
30	30	"Sheepwalking"	J.P. Vine	Glenn Dakin	TBA	7 September 2007	131
It is a peaceful night at the farm until Shaun starts to walk in his sleep, at which point he causes trouble without realising it. The flock, unable to resist their natural instinct to follow, worsens this situation.
31	31	"Tidy Up"	J.P. Vine	Ian Carney	Rob Richards	10 September 2007	135
Bitzer is asked to take out the rubbish, but when the bag gets a tear in it, the result is a messy field. The Farmer orders Bitzer to clean it up, but he makes the mistake of getting Shaun and company to help. The situation gets more worse when they use the vacuum cleaner.
32	32	"The Farmer's Niece"	Andrew Symanowski	Ian Carney	David Vinicombe and J.P. Vine	10 September 2007	132
When the Farmer's Niece comes for a visit, and Shaun and Bitzer soon discover she isn't as cute and adorable as she seems and she is a spoilt brat. Meanwhile, the Farmer tries to bake a cake for her.
33	33	"Camping Chaos"	Mike Mort	Julie Jones	TBA	11 September 2007	128
When a traveller pitches a messy camp in the sheep's field, and then goes off exploring with Bitzer, Shaun and the flock decide to do some exploring of their own.
34	34	"Helping Hound"	Darren Walsh	Richard "Golly" Goleszowski & Rob Dudley	Michael Salter	11 September 2007	137
The Farmer decides to get a robot sheep-dog, but when it turns out to be even stricter and more like a dictator than Bitzer, Shaun decides it has to go.
35	35	"Troublesome Tractor"	Mike Mort	Richard "Golly" Goleszowski & Rob Dudley	TBA	12 September 2007	125
The tractor seems to be ready for the scrap heap and the Farmer can't afford to buy a new one. The sheep have plans to help him. But when the Farmer goes to try it, it drove improperly and crashed, as the sheep forgot to install the device that makes the tractor drive properly.
36	36	"Stick with Me"	J.P. Vine	Glenn Dakin	TBA	12 September 2007	133
Bitzer glues the Farmer's broken glasses back together. When he accidentally gets stuck to the bottle of glue, things start to get very sticky.
37	37	"Heavy Metal Shaun"	Mike Mort	Lee Pressman	Sylvia Bennion	13 September 2007	126
The farmer inspects the lawn with a metal detector. When Shaun and Bitzer try it, they "detect" a metallic menace behind the hedge.
38	38	"Snore-Worn Shaun"	Darren Walsh	Elly Brewer	J.P. Vine	13 September 2007	138
Shirley's loud snoring wakes everyone up, so Shaun decides that the only way to get a peaceful night's sleep is to get her out of the barn.
39	39	"Save the Tree"	J.P. Vine	Trevor Ricketts	David Vinicombe	14 September 2007	129
The Farmer wants to turn the tree in Shaun's field into firewood. The flock must take desperate measures to stop their beloved tree from getting cut down.
40	40	"Shaun Encounters"	Lee Wilton	Charles Hodges	Sylvia Bennion	14 September 2007	139
Two mischievous alien kids land at the farm one night and run riot. Shaun and Bitzer attempt to stop them before The Farmer finds out.

=== Series 2 (2009–10) ===
Series 2 consists of 40 episodes and commenced airing in the United Kingdom on 23 November 2009 on BBC One and BBC HD. It had already started airing in Germany on 18 October 2009. The series director was Chris Sadler. This series was shot with digital camera still images that were edited into high definition video. There were major changes in the looks of the characters (e.g., The pigs are slimmer, Timmy's mother's eyes are big and connected, the Farmer now has a molded line separating his stubble and Bitzer and Pidsley now has detailed fur), the bull was absent throughout the whole series and the title sequence was also adapted to reflect these changes.

No. overall	No. in season	Title	Directed by	Written by	UK airdate (Note: Attributed to the following sources:)
41	1	"Double Trouble"	Seamus Malone	Richard Goleszowski & Rob Dudley	23 November 2009
Shaun dresses to look like the Farmer for fun, and learns he can now give Bitzer orders, so he organises a party. However, Bitzer's smart enough to know the difference between the real Farmer and the fake one. Then the real one shows up.
42	2	"Draw the Line"	Richard Webber	Glenn Dakin	24 November 2009
When the Farmer steals a line striping machine, the sheep come across it and have fun making various works of art.
43	3	"Sheepless Nights"	Richard Webber	Lucy Daniel Raby	25 November 2009
When the sheep's stable's roof is broken, rain pours in. Bitzer orders the sheep to sleep in the pig sty, which is zealously guarded by the pigs.
44	4	"Spring Lamb"	Seamus Malone	Elly Brewer	26 November 2009
Timmy refuses to take a bath, but when a spring gets attached to his tail, it makes it a lot easier to evade the sheep, who try to catch him.
45	5	"Strictly No Dancing"	Seamus Malone	Jimmy Hibbert	27 November 2009
When the Farmer plays loud music while dancing with Pidsley, the annoyed sheep attempt to turn off the racket.
46	6	"Who's the Caddy?"	Seamus Malone	Will MacLean & John Camm	30 November 2009
When the Farmer injures his back while playing golf, Bitzer is forced to tend to him, while Shaun takes a couple of whacks himself.
47	7	"Hair Today, Gone Tomorrow"	Seamus Malone	Lee Pressman	1 December 2009
The Farmer places away his prized wig before a date, but when it gets blown off, Shaun and the flock try to recover it. Note: This episode shares its premise with a Nintendo DS video game titled Shaun the Sheep: Off His Head, which had been released two months earlier.
48	8	"Bagpipe Buddy"	Richard Webber	Julie Jones	2 December 2009
When the flock encounters a bagpipe and mistake it for some kind of injured bird, they try to fix it up, until the Farmer notices it.
49	9	"Supersize Timmy"	Seamus Malone	Dan Berlinka & Andy Williams	3 December 2009
Timmy sees the Farmer using a growth substance on a new tomato plant, causing one of the tomatoes to become larger. He eats the tomato, only to grow into a giant, which leads to chaos when he sees everything as a toy.
50	10	"Lock Out"	Seamus Malone	Dave Ingham	4 December 2009
When the Farmer gets locked out of his house, he is forced to sleep in the farmhouse, but his obnoxious snoring bothers the sheep. They concoct a plan to get him back into his house.
51	11	"Cheetah Cheater"	Lee Wilton	Richard Vincent	7 December 2009
After watching a nature documentary about cheetahs, Pidsley gets the idea of dressing up as a ferocious cheetah to scare the sheep.
52	12	"Ewe've Been Framed"	Richard Webber	Patrick Makin	8 December 2009
Shaun accidentally breaks the farmer's glasses. In the end, the sheep give him new glasses to help him see things more clearly.
53	13	"Bitzer's New Hat"	Seamus Malone	Christopher Sadler	9 December 2009
After his niece gives him a pink hat, the Farmer replaces Bitzer's iconic blue hat with the pink one. Ashamed with his new appearance, Shaun attempts to recover his old hat.
54	14	"Hide and Squeak"	Seamus Malone	Kieron Self & Giles New	10 December 2009
Pidsley chases a helpless little mouse all around the farm, soon leading Shaun to try and protect it from him.
55	15	"Frantic Romantic"	Seamus Malone	James Henry	11 December 2009
The Farmer organizes a romantic dinner with his girlfriend, but when it is revealed he's terrible at cooking, the sheep take over.
56	16	"Everything Must Go"	Richard Webber	Richard Goleszowski & Rob Dudley	14 December 2009
The Farmer organizes a garage sale to get more money, but when he leaves for a moment and tasks Bitzer with selling items, he leaves that job to the flock, who end up selling everything the Farmer owns.
57	17	"Party Animals"	Richard Webber	Nick Park	15 December 2009
The Farmer's birthday is coming up, and Bitzer is tasked with mailing in envelopes for the party, but when he accidentally tosses them all in the sewer, the sheep decide to disguise themselves in costumes to attend the Farmer's birthday party.
58	18	"Cat Got Your Brain?"	Seamus Malone	Dan Berlinka & Andy Williams	16 December 2009
Two aliens kidnap Shaun and Pidsley, but an accident causes them to swap the two animals' brains. Returning to Earth, neither realizes they are in the wrong body, causing much confusion.
59	19	"Two's Company"	Richard Webber	Kay Stonham	17 December 2009
Shaun meets a female sheep, who which he immediately falls in love with. While the couple try to endure in romantic activities, they are constantly interrupted by the flock, who keeps following them and won't leave them alone.
60	20	"In the Doghouse"	Lee Wilton	Lee Pressman	18 December 2009
When the Farmer accidentally destroys Bitzer's doghouse, leaving him homeless, Shaun and the flock attempt to rebuild him a new home.
61	21	"The Boat"	Richard Webber	Richard Goleszowski & Rob Dudley	17 May 2010
The Farmer gets Bitzer to help him renovate an old boat, but as soon as his back is turned, the sheep and pigs turn the refurbishment into a swashbuckling of pirates.
62	22	"What's Up, Dog?"	Lee Wilton	Lee Pressman	18 May 2010
A wayward balloonist (the Farmer’s girlfriend) lands in the sheep's field. Shaun and his friends are intrigued by the hot air balloon and inadvertently take to the skies. Down on the ground, an ever more desperate Bitzer runs himself ragged attempting to bring the wayward sheep back down to earth safely.
63	23	"Cock-a-Doodle Shaun"	Seamus Malone	Sarah Ball	19 May 2010
The rooster is missing, and there's no one to wake up the farm. When Shaun discovers the rooster has been snatched by the greedy fox, he sets off with Bitzer on a daring rescue mission.
64	24	"Bitzer's Basic Training"	Richard Webber	Dan Berlinka & Andy Williams	20 May 2010
Bitzer thinks the Farmer is planning to replace him, so Shaun helps to knock his friend into shape. While things initially go as expected, Bitzer quickly goes completely over the top with his training regime and starts running the farm with military precision, driving everyone crazy.
65	25	"Chip Off the Old Block"	Lee Wilton	Ian Carney	21 May 2010
The Farmer has taken up sculpting, but unintentionally drops a huge slab of stone on top of Timmy's teddy bear, making him distraught. Shaun and the flock must struggle and strain to lift the heavy block and retrieve the precious toy.
66	26	"Pig Trouble"	Lee Wilton	Lee Pressman	24 May 2010
When Bitzer hurts his foot and can't work, the Farmer chooses the pigs to take over his role. The power-crazy pigs take the opportunity to turn the farm into a paradise and make the sheep their slaves. Bitzer tries in vain to warn his master what is going on behind his back, but when he fails, Shaun decides to step in and restore the status quo.
67	27	"Bitzer from the Black Lagoon"	Seamus Malone	Glenn Dakin	25 May 2010
While trying to retrieve his ball Shaun accidentally kicked out, Bitzer falls into a muddy pond. A muddy creature emerges, wearing Bitzer's hat, and when Shaun hears this thing squelching across the flock's field, he's convinced that they are being attacked by a swamp monster. Shortly after they find the real suspect and decide that the monster is Bitzer and try to clean him up, the sheep realize they are cleaning up a real swamp monster, who's revealed to be a naked and angry humanoid sausage-like creature when the real Bitzer shows up.
68	28	"Zebra Ducks of the Serengeti"	Lee Wilton	Richard Goleszowski & Rob Dudley	26 May 2010
After getting covered in soot, two hapless ducks are mistaken for a pair of rare African Zebra Ducks. Seeing a way to make money, the Farmer transforms Shaun's field into an exotic duck enclosure, which he gleefully opens to the public. Shaun doesn't appreciate losing his field and sets about exposing the fraud, while Bitzer tries to stop the truth from coming out.
69	29	"Whistleblower"	Richard Webber	Mark Daydy	27 May 2010
Bitzer loses his precious whistle and tests out a trumpet as a replacement. Before long, the power of the trumpet goes to his head and his fanfares and jazz-style playing drive Mower Mouth and the flock around the bend. Eventually, Shaun gets tired of it and goes on a search to find the whistle.
70	30	"The Big Chase"	Seamus Malone	Craig Ferguson & Patrick Gallagher	28 May 2010
When Timmy drives off on the farmer's brand new quad bike, Shaun, Bitzer and the flock have to give pursuit by any means available. Very soon, half of the animals on the farm have joined in the pursuit. The sheep must stop Timmy and return the quad bike before the Farmer finds out.
71	31	"The Magpie"	Richard Webber	Giles New & Keiron Self	6 December 2010
A magpie's nest fills up with stolen items from around the farm. When the magpie steals Timmy's toy robot, it's up to Shaun to stop the thieving bird.
72	32	"Operation Pidsley"	Richard Webber	Dave Ingham	7 December 2010
The sheep throw a party in the house, but Pidsley captures their antics on film, forcing Shaun and Bitzer to work together to prevent him from showing the pictures to the Farmer.
73	33	"Pig Swill Fly"	Richard Webber	Jimmy Hibbert	8 December 2010
An inspector visits the farm, and Bitzer tries to prevent a tragedy when a fight breaks out between the pigs and the sheep.
74	34	"Shirley Whirley"	Lee Wilton	Sarah Ball	9 December 2010
Shirley has wheels and an eventual remote control installed so that Shaun can move her around easily, but the Farmer's television remote interferes with the signal.
75	35	"Foxy Laddie"	Seamus Malone	Christopher Sadler	10 December 2010
The fox, disguised as a ram, attempts to devour Timmy and infiltrate the flock. But he first must alternate between fending off both the suspicious Shaun and the lovestruck Shirley, who must save Timmy.
76	36	"Shaun Goes Potty"	Seamus Malone	Nathan Cockerill	13 December 2010
Bitzer and the flock have a game on the Farmer's new pool table, but they accidentally damage it. Shaun and the flock try to fix it while Bitzer tries to distract the Farmer.
77	37	"An Ill Wind"	Seamus Malone	Chris Parker	14 December 2010
The farmer receives a huge power-electricity bill, and decides to build a wind turbine to power the house. However, as soon as his back is turned, Shaun and the flock transform the new contraption into a fairground ride.
78	38	"Fireside Favourite"	Lee Wilton	Ian Carney	15 December 2010
Pidsley the cat is upset when his favourite spot is taken by Bitzer, who gets tucked up in the house when he gets a cold. Shaun must keep him where he is and stop Pidsley from throwing him out.
79	39	"Snowed In"	Richard Webber & Lee Wilton	Gareth Owen	16 December 2010
Everyone awakens to find the farm covered in snow, but while the sheep have a massive snowball fight, the Farmer is trapped inside the farmhouse.
80	40	"We Wish Ewe a Merry Christmas"	Lee Wilton	Charles Hodges	17 December 2010
After receiving Christmas gifts, the sheep learn that the Farmer will be spending Christmas Day alone, so the animals decorate the farmhouse to give him a magical time.

=== Series 3 (2012) ===
Bitzer has now returned to using his Series 1 model, and Pidsley was removed starting this season. The farmer's glasses are now square-shaped, and the bull has returned. Also, the theme song is re-recorded by Mark Thomas and Vic Reeves. All episodes premiered in Germany on the KiKa channel between 30 November and 9 December 2012. In the UK, it ran between 25 February 2013 and 21 March 2013 on the CBBC channel.

No. overall	No. in season	Title	Directed by	Written by	Original release date	UK airdate
81	1	"The Stand Off"	Lee Wilton	Ian Carney	26 November 2012	25 February 2013
A traffic jam occurs on the road, and Shaun and the flock can't get past. Bitzer decides to let them walk through a lorry, but then has to save them when they don't come out on the other side.
82	2	"The Coconut"	Andy Symanowski	Lee Pressman	27 November 2012	26 February 2013
The Farmer returns from the fair triumphant - he's won a coconut! He soon discovers getting into the coconut isn't as easy as it seems. Shaun and Bitzer take on the challenge and try every trick in the book but it proves a tough nut to crack.
83	3	"The Shepherd"	Christopher Sadler	Richard Starzak & Rob Dudley	28 November 2012	27 February 2013
Torrential rain threatens to ruin the annual Sheep Dog trials, but The Farmer begs the judges for an opportunity to show off his talented Flock. Things go smoothly until Timmy tries to learn to whistle … Will this stop The Farmer winning another cup to add to his prize collection?
84	4	"You Missed a Bit"	Christopher Sadler	Trevor Ricketts	29 November 2012	28 February 2013
The Farmer expects the windows of his farmhouse to be spotless, so Bitzer calls on the services of The Flock to help him clean them. He quickly discovers that they don't always work very well as a team when chaos breaks out. Will Bitzer be able to clear up the mess before The Farmer returns?
85	5	"Let's Spray"	Andy Symanowski	Richard Starzak, Rob Dudley & Andy Symanowski	30 November 2012	7 April 2014 (DVD) (Note: This episode was released in the UK on the Shaun The Sheep: Spring Cleaning DVD on 7 April 2014)
Someone has been spraying graffiti around the farm and Bitzer is not amused as he's left to clean it up! When he discovers the culprits, he decides to teach them a lesson – however they have a few surprises to pull out of the bag. Note: This episode didn't air in the UK, due to its use of graffiti. However, it was included as a bonus episode on the UK DVD release of Spring Cleaning, which came out on 7 April 2014.
86	6	"The Crow"	Andy Symanowski	Lee Pressman	3 December 2012	1 March 2013
A loud crow in the barn prevents Shaun and the flock from sleeping, so they try to find a solution to get the crow out of the barn so they can be able to sleep without noise.
87	7	"Shaun the Fugitive"	Andy Symanowski	Jimmy Hibbert	4 December 2012	4 March 2013
After Shaun is caught and reprimanded by the Farmer for eating the latter’s cakes, an engineer arrives. Shaun thinks that he's about to be killed, so he goes into hiding.
88	8	"Hard to Swallow"	Christopher Sadler	David Ingham	5 December 2012	5 March 2013
Shaun finds a duck-call whistle, which amuses everyone except the ducks around the farm. But when an altercation with an angry mother duck causes him to swallow it accidentally, things get complicated.
89	9	"Mission Inboxible"	Seamus Malone	Seamus Malone & Richard Starzak	6 December 2012	6 March 2013
Shaun goes on a secret mission today to retrieve his football from the farmer's home. Meanwhile, the farmer has trouble with his computer.
90	10	"Bye Bye, Barn"	Christopher Sadler	Alex Hawkey	7 December 2012	7 March 2013
The farmer hires two builders to change the barn into his own dream house. Shaun and the flock have plans to save the barn, however.
91	11	"The Rounders Match"	Andy Synmanowski	Richard Starzak & Rob Dudley	10 December 2012	8 March 2013
The Flock and The Pigs are in the middle of a high-spirited game of rounders. Tensions are high as Shaun steps up to the plate – will he score the winning run? Will the Pigs' foul-play prevent victory? Or will The Farmer discover what they're up to?
92	12	"Film Night"	Seamus Malone	Richard Starzak	11 December 2012	11 March 2013
Bitzer discovers Shaun watching old home movies in the barn. He joins him to share some fond memories of life on the farm. However, they don't like everything they see! Things get heated as the pair try to outdo each other by showing embarrassing clips from each other's past. Is this the end of a beautiful friendship?
93	13	"Fossils"	Lee Wilton	Lee Pressman	12 December 2012	12 March 2013
Bitzer has a map and a nose for hidden treasure – especially when it's a bone! This time he has unearthed more than he can chew. Shaun and The Flock get stuck in to help discover what he has found. It's beyond everyone's wildest dreams!
94	14	"The Skateboard"	Lee Wilton	Richard Starzak, Rob Dudley & Maisy-Rae Catton	13 December 2012	13 March 2013
Shaun decides he wants to have a go at skateboarding and sets about building a skatepark from scrap he finds in the dump. Before too long he gets carried away and suddenly discovers it's a bit riskier than he first thought. Bitzer to the rescue!
95	15	"The Piano"	Christopher Sadler	Jimmy Hibbert	14 December 2012	14 March 2013
The Farmer is playing the piano and torturing everyone with his musical inability! When The Flock discover that Bitzer on the other hand is a virtuoso they decide it's time for a party. They devise a plan to 'borrow' the piano when The Farmer goes to bed – however things don't quite go to plan.
96	16	"The Snapshot"	Suzy Fagan	Ian Carney & Maisy-Rae Catton	17 December 2012	15 March 2013
Shaun realises he is accidentally cut out of the Farmer's family photo when the Farmer tries to take the picture, so he and Bitzer try to work on the perfect snapshot to complete the photo.
97	17	"Prickly Heat"	Suzy Fagan	Lee Pressman	18 December 2012	18 March 2013
It is a scorching hot day on the farm and the flock need to cool off, but can't go into the sheep dip. Bitzer finds an inflatable swimming pool, and then must help keep the Farmer cool, leading the flock to investigate the swimming pool.
98	18	"The Hang Glider"	Lee Wilton	Jimmy Hibbert	19 December 2012	19 March 2013
The Farmer has a thrilling new hobby - riding a hang glider that he receives. However, when Shaun and the flock decide to give it a go, they learn that it is not as easy as it looks.
99	19	"The Shadow Play"	Seamus Malone	Richard Starzak & Rob Dudley	20 December 2012	20 March 2013
After failing to comfort an overtired Timmy, the flock decides to put on a shadow puppet show.
100	20	"Bull vs. Wool"	Seamus Malone	Seamus Malone & Richard Starzak	21 December 2012	21 March 2013
Bitzer's antics with a red napkin at a picnic attract the attention of the bull, which chases him, Shaun and Timmy into the barn. To entertain Shaun and Bitzer, Timmy decides to put on a show with his drawings.

=== Series 4 (2014) ===
The first 20 episodes of the fourth series, consisting of 30 episodes in total, began airing on 3 February 2014 on CBBC and internationally on 4 February 2014. Another ten episodes began airing on the Australian television channel ABC3 starting from 17 September 2014. These episodes began on CBBC on 8 December 2014.

No. overall	No. in season	Title	Directed by	Written by	Original release date	UK airdate	Prod. code
101	1	"Cones"	Jay Grace	Lee Pressman	4 February 2014	3 February 2014	401
The flock diverts an ice cream van into their field, but then must distract the driver and the farmer from what they're doing.
102	2	"Caught Short Alien"	Lee Wilton	Trevor Ricketts	5 February 2014	4 February 2014	402
Shaun's old friend the Alien drops by for a toilet break, and leaves Shaun in charge of his time-stopping laser.
103	3	"Happy Birthday Timmy!"	Lee Wilton	Sara Barbas	6 February 2014	5 February 2014	403
It is Timmy's birthday and Shaun and his friends throw him a party. But as Timmy is opening some presents, an important football game on the Farmer's TV distracts them from minding him. He gets abducted by the greedy pigs, who then open all of his presents and steal them for themselves, and when the game ends and Timmy's mother enters the barn and realises he's gone and the floor is a mess with wrapping paper, it's up to Shaun and the flock to save Timmy and retrieve his presents before night falls. Note: This is the second episode to include Timmy's birthday, the first was in "Timmy's Birthday" which is a Timmy Time episode.
104	4	"The Genie"	Jay Grace	Glenn Dakin & Maisy-Rae Catton	7 February 2014	6 February 2014	404
Shaun dreams of a life in the fast-lane, and tries to get what he wants when the flock finds a genie in a lamp.
105	5	"3DTV"	Jay Grace	Rob Dudley & Richard Starzak	8 February 2014	7 February 2014	405
The Farmer is very excited by his new purchase – a 3D TV. However, when Bitzer accidentally puts a hole in the wall while setting it up, Shaun and the others have to imitate the telly to keep the Farmer from finding out what has really happened.
106	6	"The Smelly Farmer"	Jay Grace	Jimmy Hibbert	11 February 2014	10 February 2014	406
One morning, the farmer is smelling so bad, causing Shaun, Bitzer, and the flock to gross out. So they decide to give him a wash.
107	7	"DIY"	Lee Wilton	Richard Phelan	12 February 2014	11 February 2014	407
Bitzer is left in charge of decorating a room and calls on the flock for help. However, the flock soon enter another sticky situation when they play with the glue and wallpaper.
108	8	"The Rabbit"	Lee Wilton	Dave Ingham	13 February 2014	12 February 2014	408
The Farmer's niece has come to visit, bringing her precious pet rabbit with her. When it goes missing under Bitzer's watch, Shaun leads everyone on a search for it.
109	9	"Prize Possession"	Lee Wilton	Glenn Dakin	14 February 2014	13 February 2014	409
The Farmer wins the lottery and asks Bitzer to guard his ticket. However, when Bitzer loses the ticket and it ends up in the bull's pen, he and Shaun must get it back.
110	10	"The Spider"	Jay Grace	Mark Robertson	15 February 2014	14 February 2014	410
Bitzer wants to have a bath, but is rudely disturbed by a persistent spider, which Shaun attempts to get rid of.
111	11	"The Loony-Tic"	Jay Grace	Caimh McDonnell	18 February 2014	17 February 2014	411
Shaun tries to find out what is causing Bitzer and the flock's strange behaviour, in that they have frequent and unexpected tics.
112	12	"Men at Work"	Lee Wilton	Sam Morrison	19 February 2014	18 February 2014	412
The Flock has some fun with a water leak, but when two workers stop the water flow to work on it, the flock decides to steal some of their equipment and have fun with it instead.
113	13	"The Dog Show"	Lee Wilton	Sam Morrison	20 February 2014	19 February 2014	413
The Farmer enters Bitzer in a dog show. But when they laugh them out, he hatches another riskier plan to win.
114	14	"Missing Piece"	Jay Grace	Ciaran Murtagh & Andrew Jones	21 February 2014	20 February 2014	414
Shaun comes across a discarded jigsaw puzzle, which he and the others proceed to work on. However, there is a missing piece, and it just happens to be on the farmer's trousers.
115	15	"Wildlife Watch"	Lee Wilton	Trevor Ricketts	22 February 2014	21 February 2014	415
A film crew arrives to record a rare bird nesting at Mossybottom Farm, but the farmer is attracted to one of them and ruins their attempts.
116	16	"The Pelican"	Jay Grace	Rob Dudley	25 February 2014	24 February 2014	416
An unusual guest lands on the farm, hurt and hungry. Shaun and his friends take charge in looking after him.
117	17	"Bad Boy"	Jay Grace	Lee Pressman, Ian Carney & Richard Beek	26 February 2014	25 February 2014	417
There's a new dog on the block, but he turns out to have a wild side and plays pranks on Shaun and Bitzer. To get back at him, they attempt to prank him in return.
118	18	"Remote Control"	Lee Wilton	Dave Ingham	27 February 2014	26 February 2014	418
Bitzer is sent to fix the faulty telly aerial and asks the flock for help.
119	19	"Phoney Farmer"	Jay Grace	Jimmy Hibbert	28 February 2014	27 February 2014	419
The Farmer is off on holiday, but his replacement is only interested in eating and sleeping. After locking the animals in the barn, they set up a plan to scare him, which works.
120	20	"Ground Dog Day"	Lee Wilton	Dan Berlinka	1 March 2014	21 April 2014	420
Bitzer struggles to finish his list of chores before the ice cream van arrives.
121	21	"The Intruder"	Lee Wilton	Richard Phelan	2 September 2014	8 December 2014	421
The Farmer becomes annoyed when a crow begins to create mayhem across the farm. Bitzer disguises himself as a scarecrow, but needs help from Shaun to make the problem disappear.
122	22	"Bitzer for a Day"	Jay Grace	Richard Phelan	3 September 2014	9 December 2014	423
Shaun decides to be in charge when the Farmer and Bitzer run off to play together, but it turns out to be much harder than he expects.
123	23	"Bitzer's Secret"	Lee Wilton	Sam Morrison	4 September 2014	10 December 2014	424
Bitzer is called upon by the Farmer to help him get fit, which isn't quite what he had in mind. He tries to cheat on the regimen, but the wily Shaun decides to teach him to see the error of his ways.
124	24	"Ping-Pong Poacher"	Lee Wilton	Jimmy Hibbert	5 September 2014	11 December 2014	428
The sly fox tries to take advantage of the animals on the farm being distracted whilst cheering on Shaun, who is playing against Bitzer in a ping pong match.
125	25	"Hidden Talents"	Jay Grace	Glenn Dakin	6 September 2014	12 December 2014	429
Shaun and the Flock decide to entertain one another with their best party tricks. Their fun is spoiled, however, when the Farmer decides that he wants to join in too.
126	26	"Picture Perfect"	Jay Grace	Mark Robertson	9 September 2014	15 December 2014	426
After completing all of his tasks, Bitzer is shocked to find the state of the barn and decides to help by tidying up. He has a lot of difficulty trying to rehang a perpetually tilting picture, until the flock comes up with its own solution.
127	27	"Save the Dump"	Jay Grace	Dave Ingham	10 September 2014	16 December 2014	427
When the prospect of the Farmer's new golf course ruining their dump begins to become a reality, Shaun and the Flock have to resort to canny ways to save their prized resources.
128	28	"Duck!"	Lee Wilton	Robin Crowther-Smith	11 September 2014	17 December 2014	422
Calm in the barn is disturbed when a pair of ducks set up a nest on the roof of Bitzer's kennel. The ducks don't take kindly to efforts to encourage them to move on.
129	29	"The Stare"	Jay Grace	Sara Barbas	12 September 2014	18 December 2014	425
Mower Mouth places first Shaun, then the Flock under his hypnotic spell. Bitzer and Shaun need teamwork to put the goat in his place.
130	30	"Fruit & Nuts"	Lee Wilton	Steve Box	13 September 2014	19 December 2014	430
Shaun has had enough of being a grazer and decides to raid the Farmer's apple tree. Meanwhile, fellow sheep Nuts wants to help, but his tendecy to sneeze frequently ruin Shaun's plans.

=== Specials (2015–21) ===
No.	Title	Original release date
1	The Farmer's Llamas	26 December 2015
When the Farmer goes to market to pick up some pigs, mischievous Shaun tags along and gets the Farmer to return home with a trio of exotic llamas instead. At first, the flock welcomed their new residents, but soon, the new llamas got a bit too comfortable in their new home, and the Flock grew suspicious of their intentions.
2	The Flight Before Christmas	3 December 2021 24 December 2021 (BBC One)
It's Christmas Eve on the farm, and the sheep are getting ready for the celebration. But after Bitzer brings too small stockings, Shaun and Timmy hatch a plan to steal the Farmer's socks. Meanwhile, the Farmer has prepared some extremely fizzy drinks to sell and, dressed like Santa, takes Bitzer to the city square. Timmy, believing that he is the real Santa, follows him right into his truck. Now Shaun and the flock must start an operation to bring Timmy back, but matters soon get complicated when Timmy ends up becoming a present to Farmer Ben's energetic and rebellious little girl Ella.

=== Series 5 (2016) ===
A fifth series began airing on CBBC on 5 September 2016. The season first aired in the Netherlands from 1 December 2015 to 1 January 2016 and in Australia in January 2016. Mark Thomas and Vic Reeves once again re-recorded the theme tune, as it sounds different.

No. overall	No. in season	Title	Directed by	Written by	UK airdate	Prod. code
131	1	"Out of Order"	Will Becher	Sam Morrison & Steve Box	5 September 2016	501
When the Farmer gets stuck in the loo, Bitzer has to get vital supplies to him as a matter of urgency. His initial efforts end in failure and he drafts in Shaun and the gang to help out.
132	2	"Karma Farmer"	Will Becher	Sara Barbas; From an idea by: Richard Beek	6 September 2016	502
The Farmer is stressed out and has had enough of the farm and its inhabitants. He storms off for a break, suitcase in hand, only to reappear almost immediately, the same, but somehow different. The farm is transformed into a hippy commune where work and chores are abolished and the animals are encouraged to express themselves. Bitzer, however, mad at the whole situation, concocts a plan with Shaun to bring the farm back to its regular state before the real Farmer returns.
133	3	"Spoilsport"	Will Becher	Robin Crowther-Smith	7 September 2016	507
Shaun persuades Bitzer to take part in his game of cricket but Bitzer is more worried about the condition of the pitch than the game. The resident moles, unhappy at the game taking place above their head get involved in an argument with Bitzer, which soon escalates to a full-scale war.
134	4	"Baa-d Hair Day"	Will Becher	Dave Ingham	8 September 2016	508
The flock doesn't recognize Shaun when he loses one of his most distinctive features. His old pal Bitzer helps him track down the lost hairdo, but not before Shaun becomes very attached to one of the chickens.
135	5	"The Farmer's Nephew"	Will Becher	Dan Berlinka	9 September 2016	509
Bitzer is left with a mountain of work when the farmer is rendered incapable. Enter the farmhand who is more interested in his mobile phone than getting the task done. Shaun and Flock ensure that their friend Bitzer gets his own 'down time'. Guest star: Rasmus Hardiker as the Farmer's Nephew
136	6	"Babysitter Bitzer"	Will Becher	Mark Robertson	12 September 2016	515
The flock are off for a night party leaving Bitzer to babysit Timmy. It's not long before the youngster makes clear who's in charge.
137	7	"Dodgy Lodger"	Will Becher	Mark Huckerby & Nick Ostler	13 September 2016	517
When one of the pigs attempts to make friends with Timmy, the other two pigs exile him as punishment for un-pig-like behaviour. The sheep take him into the barn, and attempt to transform him into the epitome of porcine sophistication, but they made the mistake of inviting him to their home.
138	8	"Dangerous Deliveries"	Will Becher	Glenn Dakin	14 September 2016	514
Every time the postman pays the Farmer a visit, Bitzer's canine instincts get the better of him, resulting in shredded mail and an irate farmer. Shaun decides to help by taking on the role of Bitzer's therapist…with unexpected consequences.
139	9	"Timmy and the Dragon"	Will Becher	Mark Huckerby & Nick Ostler	15 September 2016	518
Bitzer, Shaun and the gang believe there is a monster loose on the farm and hide in the barn. But what exactly is it they are afraid of?
140	10	"Bitzer's New Whistle"	Will Becher	Mark Robertson	16 September 2016	516
Bitzer thinks the future has arrived when he takes delivery of his new high tech farmyard control module but when the gadget malfunctions, Bitzer is left wishing for his old whistle.
141	11	"Turf Wars"	Lee Wilton	Dave Ingham	7 November 2016	503
War begins when the pigs muscle in on Shaun's private club, steal all the pizza, and kidnap Timmy. Shaun, Bitzer and the flock mount a mission to rescue him and make peace with the pigs, which works.
142	12	"A Prickly Problem"	Lee Wilton	Sara Barbas & Steve Box	8 November 2016	504
Some hedgehogs get help from Timmy to find somewhere to rest for the night. His efforts, however, lead his weary friends into a series a scrapes rather than giving them a good night's sleep.
143	13	"Wanted"	Lee Wilton	Dan Berlinka	9 November 2016	505
The farm is paid an unexpected visit from an escapee from the nearby prison who takes refuge in the barn. After a short while with Shaun and the gang, though, he thinks that prison doesn't seem such a bad option.
144	14	"Rude Dude"	Lee Wilton	Robin Crowther-Smith	10 November 2016	506
Never meet your Heroes. The Farmer's Rock n'Roll idol is stranded at the farm when his limousine breaks down. Soon revealed as a spoilt pretender, Shaun decides to show him a lesson from the 'School of Rock'. Guest star: Phil Cornwell as the Singer
145	15	"Keeping the Peace"	Lee Wilton	Dan Berlinka & Steve Box	11 November 2016	510
After spending the night putting together the bed instead of sleeping in it…the farmer has a lie in and Bitzer is in charge of making sure his master's rest is uninterrupted. Keeping the farm quiet proves to be a full time job for Bitzer.
146	16	"Happy Farmers' Day"	Lee Wilton	Richard Phelan; From an idea by: Shaun Lappin	14 November 2016	511
Bitzer treats the farmer to a restaurant style dining experience, offering a delicious pie as the main course. But when the pie goes missing, Bitzer makes the mistake of accepting Shaun and the flock's offer of help in the kitchen… until Timmy tells him that he and Shirley hid the pie in the freezer so it wouldn't be tampered with.
147	17	"Checklist"	Lee Wilton	Richard Phelan	15 November 2016	512
Bitzer's over-officious management style becomes too much for the sheep who decide it's time for him to chill out. Bitzer's tasks for the day take on a new purpose, for everyone to have some fun!
148	18	"Return to Sender"	Lee Wilton	Patrick Makin & Steve Box	16 November 2016	513
The Farmer receives a mystery gift from his antipodean cousin. Unimpressed with the present, he attempts to throw it away only for it to keep reappearing. He becomes convinced it has magical powers. However, Shaun discovers that the mystery gift is just a boomerang, so he and the flock have fun with it.
149	19	"Cone of Shame"	Lee Wilton	Patrick Makin & Glenn Dakin	17 November 2016	520
Bitzer is an all too willing invalid when he has to wear the cone of shame and is happy to let the flock wait on him. That is, until Shaun rumbles his malingering and plots the pooch's comeuppance.
150	20	"Sheep Farmer"	Lee Wilton	Glenn Dakin	18 November 2016	519
Timmy sees a particularly grumpy farmer giving one of the flock a hard time, a really hard time. So he gives him an idea of what it is like being a sheep. But when the time comes to have the old farmer back, things aren't so simple.

=== Series 6: Adventures from Mossy Bottom (2020) ===
A sixth series began airing in 2020 on Netflix under the subtitle Adventures from Mossy Bottom. The series reduced appearances of The Bull, extending The Goat's appearance instead. New characters appeared in the series, such as Stash the Squirrel and Farmer Ben, which also affected the new intro – now with three various variants. This was the only time throughout the series for all 20 episodes to be aired on the same day, 16 March 2020. CBBC, BBC iPlayer and BBC Two aired the episodes starting in September 2022.

No. overall	No. in season	Title	Written by	Original release date	UK airdate	Prod. code
151	1	"Baa-gherita"	Georgia Pritchett	16 March 2020	5 September 2022	601
Shaun and the flock take the opportunity to treat themselves to some home-fired pizza, but the steam attracts the drivers' attention.
152	2	"Get Your Goat"	Sam Morrison & Matthew Walker	16 March 2020	16 September 2022	610
After Shaun accidentally releases Mower Mouth, and he falls asleep in the Farmer's maize, the flock must locate him before the Farmer's harvest.
153	3	"Super Sheep"	Joseph Morpurgo	16 March 2020	8 September 2022	604
Tired of constantly being bullied by the pigs, Shaun becomes a superhero, named Super Sheep, to protect the flock from the pigs' pranks.
154	4	"Space Bitzer"	Lucy Guy	16 March 2020	15 September 2022	609
Bitzer gets a new drone and ties it to his chair when he is asleep. However, when Shaun plays with the remote, the drone flies Bitzer all the way up into outer space.
155	5	"#farmstar"	Lucy Guy; Based on an idea by: Adam Vincent - Garland	16 March 2020	13 September 2022	607
Jealous of the internet sensation that is Farmer Ben, the Farmer attempts to make his own viral videos, but no one seems to be watching them. This is until the sheep take over and turn the Farmer's previous escapades into an hilarious remix.
156	6	"CSI Mossy"	Joseph Morpurgo	16 March 2020	6 September 2022	602
When Bitzer's whistle goes missing, Shaun becomes a detective and suspects the farm's residents, who have shown annoyance to the inferior sound of Bitzer's whistle.
157	7	"Squirrelled Away"	Joseph Morpurgo	16 March 2020	14 September 2022	608
When Bitzer is birdwatching and uses nuts to attract rare birds to the farm, Stash the speedy squirrel is constantly stealing them.
158	8	"Room with a Ewe"	Lucy Guy	16 March 2020	23 September 2022	615
When the Farmer rents out the barn to tourists, leaving Shaun and the flock to sleep in rough terrain, they come up with ways to scare away the tourists and reclaim what's rightfully theirs.
159	9	"Go Bitzer Go!"	Sam Morrison	16 March 2020	19 September 2022	611
Bitzer is tired of losing the Grand Prix racing tournament to Farmer Ben's snobbish dog Lexi, so Shaun tries to help him finally beat her.
160	10	"Prize Porker"	Giles Pilbrow	16 March 2020	20 September 2022	612
When the pig steals one of Farmer Ben's trophies at the country fair, the farm's residents think he's a winner and treat him with luxury. However, Shaun quickly discovers the ruse and tries to reveal to the farm that the pig's a fraud.
161	11	"Teddy Heist"	Joseph Morpurgo	16 March 2020	12 September 2022	606
When the Farmer finds Timmy's teddy bear and learns it's worth a fortune, he locks it up in a maximum security vault, leading Shaun and the flock to retrieve it.
162	12	"Costume Drama"	Matthew Walker	16 March 2020	28 September 2022	618
A drama movie is being filmed at the farm, but when Mower Mouth eats the film tape, the flock decide to shoot a new version of the film before the crew finds out.
163	13	"Express Delivery"	Giles Pilbrow & Matthew Walker	16 March 2020	26 September 2022	616
When the Farmer's glasses break, Shaun and the flock are now able to have fun without him seeing, but when Bitzer orders a new pair of glasses, the flock attempt to stop Rita the mailwoman from making the delivery.
164	14	"Pond Life"	Lucy Guy	16 March 2020	21 September 2022	613
On a hot day, the flock decide to cool off at the pond, but when they discover that a pair of garbage men are throwing rubbish into the pond, polluting it, they decide to fight back.
165	15	"Hot to Trotter"	Giles Pilbrow	16 March 2020	22 September 2022	614
When Bitzer's dance partner, Timmy's mother, is sabotaged by the pigs before the dance competition, Shaun decides to substitute her.
166	16	"Box Fresh"	Giles Pilbrow	16 March 2020	7 September 2022	603
When the Farmer buys new white sneakers, Bitzer goes to extreme lengths to keep it from getting dirty.
167	17	"Tour de Mossy Bottom"	Jess Jackson	16 March 2020	9 September 2022	605
Bitzer uses a VR headset for an out-of-shape Farmer to get fit, but when his bike breaks loose and strolls cross country, the sheep attempt to keep it from harm.
168	18	"Sheep Sheep Goose"	Giles Pilbrow	16 March 2020	27 September 2022	617
When a baby duckling named Goz hatches in the farm, Shaun and the flock take him in, but his sense of humour later becomes too much to handle.
169	19	"Pumpkin Peril"	Jen Upton	16 March 2020	30 September 2022	620
The Farmer orders Bitzer to guard his pumpkins before Halloween, but when the night comes, the pumpkins disappear one by one, and Bitzer and the flock are determined to protect it.
170	20	"Farm Park"	Sam Morrison	16 March 2020	29 September 2022	619
When the Farmer's realizes that people find his animals interesting, he opens up a park for kids and families to play with the farm's animals, but their hyperactive energy later becomes too much for the animals to handle.

=== Series 7 (2025) ===
A seventh series was announced to be in development in 2024. On 14 May 2025, the release date for the series was set for 24 May on CBBC. Prior to this, the entire series was made available on BBC iPlayer hours before the premiere.

No. overall	No. in season	Title	Directed by	Written by	Original release date	UK airdate
171	1	"Bake it Easy"	Seamus Malone	Neeraja Raj	24 May 2025	26 May 2025
The flock eats the Farmer's birthday cake, and Shaun must secretly bake a new one.
172	2	"Shelf Life"	Seamus Malone	Matthew Walker	24 May 2025	27 May 2025
Bitzer tries DIY but ends up in a very compromised situation.
173	3	"Bed Lamb"	Seamus Malone	Brona C Titley	24 May 2025	28 May 2025
Shaun fakes illness to take a day off, but Bitzer gets suspicious when the Flock joins in.
174	4	"Shooting Stars"	Seamus Malone	Lucy Izzard	24 May 2025	29 May 2025
Bitzer wants to see a shooting star but keeps missing them due to Shaun's antics.
175	5	"Doorbell"	Seamus Malone	Matthew Walker	24 May 2025	30 May 2025
A newly installed doorbell camera records what happens when the Farmer locks himself out.
176	6	"Bee Free"	Seamus Malone	Matthew Walker; Based on an idea by: Paul Thomas	24 May 2025	2 June 2025
When the Farmer jumps out of his bee suit, the bees jump in and see life in a new way.
177	7	"Hoof Fashion"	Seamus Malone	Tasha Dhanraj	24 May 2025	3 June 2025
Shaun becomes a trendsetter but soon goes to outrageous lengths to stay fashionable.
178	8	"Bitzer's Bale Out"	Seamus Malone	Seamus Malone	24 May 2025	4 June 2025
Bitzer tries to stop the flock from eating hay but accidentally traps them in it.
179	9	"Whistle-Stop"	Seamus Malone	Seamus Malone	24 May 2025	5 June 2025
Shaun finds musical whistles that make the flock move involuntarily, creating chaos.
180	10	"Ruffing It"	Seamus Malone	Isabel Fay	24 May 2025	6 June 2025
Locked out of the barn, the flock must survive glamping with Shaun or join camp Bitzer.
181	11	"Power Cut"	Seamus Malone	Matthew Walker; Based on an idea by: Tom Lynas and Will Studd	24 May 2025	9 June 2025
With the Farmer away, Shaun and the flock have fun - but a power outage causes chaos.
182	12	"Stuck in the Muck"	Seamus Malone	Seamus Malone	24 May 2025	10 June 2025
Shaun tries to help when the tractor gets stuck, but he only gets deeper into bother.
183	13	"Spare Parts"	Seamus Malone	Richard Starzak & Matthew Walker	24 May 2025	11 June 2025
Farmer and Bitzer argue over flat-pack furniture, and Shaun sorts it out in his favour.
184	14	"Sleep on It"	Seamus Malone	Lucy Izzard	24 May 2025	12 June 2025
After Bitzer and the Farmer stay up all night, Shaun takes advantage of their sleepiness.
185	15	"Treasure Hunt"	Seamus Malone	Matthew Walker; Based on an idea by: Aidan Thomas	24 May 2025	13 June 2025
Shaun must find Bitzer's missing bone, but X doesn't always mark the spot.
186	16	"Gone to the Dogs"	Seamus Malone	Peter Lord; Based on an idea by: Ben Townsend & May Young	24 May 2025	16 June 2025
Bitzer's dad comes to stay, but he isn't impressed how his son and Shaun run the flock.
187	17	"Shirleyverse"	Seamus Malone	Anna Leong Brophy; Based on an idea by: Blair Brown & Steve Cox	24 May 2025	24 May 2025
188	18	"Shirleyverse"	Seamus Malone	Anna Leong Brophy; Based on an idea by: Blair Brown & Steve Cox	24 May 2025	24 May 2025
Shaun makes a wish that changes everything, with unexpected consequences.
189	19	"Poultrygeist"	Seamus Malone	Tasha Dhanraj; Based on an idea by: Richard Beek	1 October 2025	25 October 2025
When a chicken ends up inside Shaun's pillowcase, Shaun tries to get it back, only for the chicken to end up in the farmhouse - and the Farmer to think he is being haunted by a chicken ghost.
190	20	"Fleece Navidad"	Seamus Malone	Isabel Fay	1 December 2025	1 December 2025
Shaun secretly knits festive jumpers to brighten up the Farmer's Christmas card.

== Films ==
No.	Title	Directed by	Written by	Original release date
1	"Shaun the Sheep Movie"	Mark Burton and Richard Starzak	Mark Burton and Richard Starzak	5 February 2015
Shaun travels to the Big City in search of the Farmer. However, he finds it difficult to return home safely along with his flock, and must avoid a villain named Trumper.
2	"A Shaun the Sheep Movie: Farmageddon"	Will Becher and Richard Phelan	Story by : Richard Starzak; Screenplay by : Mark Burton and Jon Brown	18 October 2019
When an alien possessing strange powers crash-lands near Mossy Bottom Farm, Shaun quickly makes a new friend. Together, they must run from a dangerous organisation who wants to capture the intergalactic visitor.
3	"Shaun the Sheep: The Beast of Mossy Bottom"	Steve Cox and Matthew Walker	Mark Burton and Giles Pilbrow	18 September 2026
The residents of Mossy Bottom Farm are looking forward to Halloween – until the clumsy Farmer trashes the flock's beloved pumpkin patch! When Shaun turns mad scientist to fix the problem, things rapidly spiral out of control, while the Farmer is missing and a wild beast roams the woods of Mossingham.

== Other media ==
=== Shaun the Sheep 3D/Mossy Bottom Shorts (2012) ===
The following is a list of 1-minute stereoscopic 3D shorts created by Aardman for the Nintendo 3DS' Nintendo Video service. These shorts used a slightly smaller team of artists than the main series. Beginning on 15 January 2016, the shorts were released every Friday on the official Shaun the Sheep YouTube channel as "Mossy Bottom Shorts". These versions lack the 3D effect found on the Nintendo 3DS but have high-definition resolution.

No.	Title	Original release date
1	"The Picnic"	7 March 2012
The Farmer's fishing gets in the way of a picnic Shaun, Bitzer and Shirley want to have.
2	"Penalty!"	14 March 2012
2	"Five a Side"	14 March 2012
The flock has a game of football in the barn until the ball ends up getting stuck between the ceiling's wooden beams. Note: This episode was originally titled "Penalty!" when released on the Nintendo Video service but was re-titled "Five a Side" when it was released as part of the Mossy Bottom Shorts on YouTube.
3	"Babysitting Timmy"	21 March 2012
Shaun is put in charge of looking after Timmy.
4	"Bitzer Over Easy"	28 March 2012
Bitzer is sent by the Farmer to get him eggs for his breakfast.
5	"The Art Class"	4 April 2012
5	"Duck Drawing"	4 April 2012
The flock partakes in an art class. Notes: This episode was originally titled "The Art Class" when released on the Nintendo Video service but was re-titled "Duck Drawing" when it was released as part of the Mossy Bottom Shorts on YouTube. The episode originally contained a brief joke showing Shaun drawing Daffy Duck, but it was replaced with a version on YouTube showing him drawing a penguin, likely Feathers McGraw from The Wrong Trousers.
6	"Sprout-Shooters"	11 April 2012
The pigs bother Shaun with some sprout related mischief.
7	"Members Only"	18 April 2012
7	"Bale Maze"	18 April 2012
The sheep attempt to keep the Farmer from discovering their secret hideout. Note: This episode was originally titled "Members Only" when released on the Nintendo Video service but was re-titled "Bale Maze" when it was released as part of the Mossy Bottom Shorts on YouTube.
8	"Down the Loo"	25 April 2012
Shaun gets into trouble whilst retrieving a ping pong ball from the top of a scrap heap.
9	"Story Time"	2 May 2012
9	"Lights Out"	2 May 2012
The flock tries to change a lightbulb to be able to read Timmy a bedtime story. Note: This episode was originally titled "Story Time" when released on the Nintendo Video service but was re-titled "Lights Out" when it was released as part of the Mossy Bottom Shorts on YouTube.
10	"Kite"	9 May 2012
10	"Fly a Kite"	9 May 2012
Shaun comes up against a mean bull and gets his revenge. Note: This episode was originally titled "Kite" when released on the Nintendo Video service but was re-titled "Fly a Kite" when it was released as part of the Mossy Bottom Shorts on YouTube.
11	"Shaun Goes Old-School"	16 May 2012
11	"Video Arcade"	16 May 2012
11	"Super Shaun Bros."	16 May 2012
Shaun navigates the farm Super Mario Bros. style. Notes: This episode was originally titled "Shaun Goes Old School" when released on the Nintendo Video service but was re-titled "Video Arcade" when it was released as part of the Mossy Bottom Shorts on YouTube. This episode is also known as "Super Shaun Bros". The episode originally contained Koji Kondos music from Super Mario Bros. but this was replaced with original music for the release on YouTube.
12	"Shaun's Bale Out"	23 May 2012
12	"Hay Bale"	23 May 2012
Shirley keeps Bitzer, Shaun and the other sheep from moving a bale of hay to the barn. Note: This episode was originally titled "Shaun's Bale Out" when released on the Nintendo Video service but was re-titled "Hay Bale" when it was released as part of the Mossy Bottom Shorts on YouTube.
13	"Sheep Shoot Hoops"	30 May 2012
13	"Basketball"	30 May 2012
The flock plays a game of basketball, with Timmy determined not to miss out. Note: This episode was originally titled "Sheep Shoot Hoops" when released on the Nintendo Video service but was re-titled "Basketball" when it was released as part of the Mossy Bottom Shorts on YouTube.
14	"Beware! Sheep Crossing"	6 June 2012
14	"Stand Off"	6 June 2012
The flock decides to play a trick on a noisy driver. Note: This episode was originally titled "Beware! Sheep Crossing" when released on the Nintendo Video service but was re-titled "Stand Off" when it was released as part of the Mossy Bottom Shorts on YouTube.
15	"Lamb Salsa"	13 June 2012
15	"Stomp"	13 June 2012
A funky beat makes its way across the farm. Note: This episode was originally titled "Lamb Salsa" when released on the Nintendo Video service but was re-titled "Stomp" when it was released as part of the Mossy Bottom Shorts on YouTube.

=== Shaun the Sheep: Championsheeps (2012) ===
The following is a list of 1-minute sports-themed shorts that aired on CBBC in July 2012. They were made to coincide with the London 2012 Olympics celebrations. It aired on BBC Kids in October 2014.

No.	Title	Original release date
1	"Relay"	2 July 2012
2	"Shot Put"	3 July 2012
3	"Synchronised Swimming"	4 July 2012
4	"Ping Pong"	5 July 2012
5	"Diving"	6 July 2012
6	"Fencing"	9 July 2012
7	"Gymnastics"	10 July 2012
8	"Archery"	11 July 2012
9	"Weightlifting"	12 July 2012
10	"Steeplechase"	13 July 2012
11	"Beach Volleyball"	16 July 2012
12	"Hockey"	17 July 2012
13	"Swimming"	18 July 2012
14	"100 Metre Dash"	19 July 2012
15	"BMX"	20 July 2012
16	"Rings"	23 July 2012
17	"Hammer"	24 July 2012
18	"Trampoline"	25 July 2012
19	"Judo"	26 July 2012
20	"Ribbon"	27 July 2012
21	"Pole Vault"	30 July 2012
