= Shaun the Sheep =

British-German children's television series

- Genre: Comedy; Slapstick; Slice of life
- Created by: Nick Park
- Based on: Characters by: Nick Park; and Bob Baker
- Developed by: Richard Goleszowski; Alison Snowden; David Fine
- Voices of: Justin Fletcher; John Sparkes; Kate Harbour; Richard Webber; Jo Allen; Emma Tate; Andy Nyman; Simon Greenall
- Theme music composer: Mark Thomas
- Opening theme: "Life's a Treat" by Mark Thomas and Vic Reeves
- Ending theme: "Life's a Treat" (instrumental)
- Composers: Mark Thomas; Dave Newby
- Countries of origin: United Kingdom; Germany
- Original languages: English/German (written only); Animal sounds Interjection; Grammelot
- No. of series: 7
- No. of episodes: 190 (list of episodes)

Production
- Executive producers: Peter Lord; Nick Park; David Sproxton; Miles Bullough; Alix Wiseman; Sarah Cox; Jacqueline White; Carla Shelley; Allison Taylor; Michael Carrington; Nikki Chaplin; Melanie Halsall; Lucy Pryke; Brigitta Mühlenbeck; Dorte Hanke; Henrike Vieregge; Annette Walther; Jens Opatz
- Producers: Julie Lockhart; Gareth Owen; John Woolley; Danny Gallagher
- Running time: 7–14 minutes
- Production companies: Aardman Animations; BBC; Westdeutscher Rundfunk

Original release
- Network: CBBC (United Kingdom); KiKA (Germany); Netflix (Adventures from Mossy Bottom, 2020–2021)
- Release: 5 March 2007 – present

Related
- Wallace & Gromit; Timmy Time

Shaun the Sheep is a British-German animated comedy television series created by Nick Park. Produced by Aardman Animations, it is a spin-off of the Wallace & Gromit franchise, focusing on the adventures of Shaun the Sheep, who previously appeared in A Close Shave (1995), as the leader of his flock on a British farm. The series premiered on 5 March 2007 on CBBC in the UK. In 2020, the sixth series, titled Shaun the Sheep: Adventures from Mossy Bottom streamed globally on Netflix. In May 2025, a seventh series premiered. With 190 episodes over 7 series, Shaun the Sheep is one of the longest-running animated series in British and German television.

The series inspired the spin-off Timmy Time, a show aimed at younger viewers that follows Timmy, Shaun's younger cousin, while a second spin-off series, titled Let's Go Timmy!, is set to release in 2027.. These 3 series are collectively referred to as the Mossy Bottom franchise. A first feature-length film, Shaun the Sheep Movie, was released in 2015. A short film, Shaun the Sheep: The Farmer's Llamas, was aired in 2015 as a Christmas TV special.

A second feature-length film, A Shaun the Sheep Movie: Farmageddon, was released in 2019, and a second short film, Shaun the Sheep: The Flight Before Christmas, was released in 2021. A two-part episode titled "Shirleyverse" premiered on 24 May 2025 on CBBC and BBC One. A third feature-length film, Shaun the Sheep: The Beast of Mossy Bottom, was released on 18 September 2026.

== Plot ==
Shaun lives with his flock at Mossy Bottom Farm, a small farm in Northern England. Each episode centres around Shaun's attempts to add excitement to their otherwise boring lives. The action snowballs into fantastic sitcom-style escapades, most often because the sheep are fascinated with human technology and culture. This usually brings them into partnership — and sometimes conflict — with the sheepdog Bitzer, while they all are simultaneously trying to avoid having their anthropomorphism being discovered by the farmer.

== Characters ==
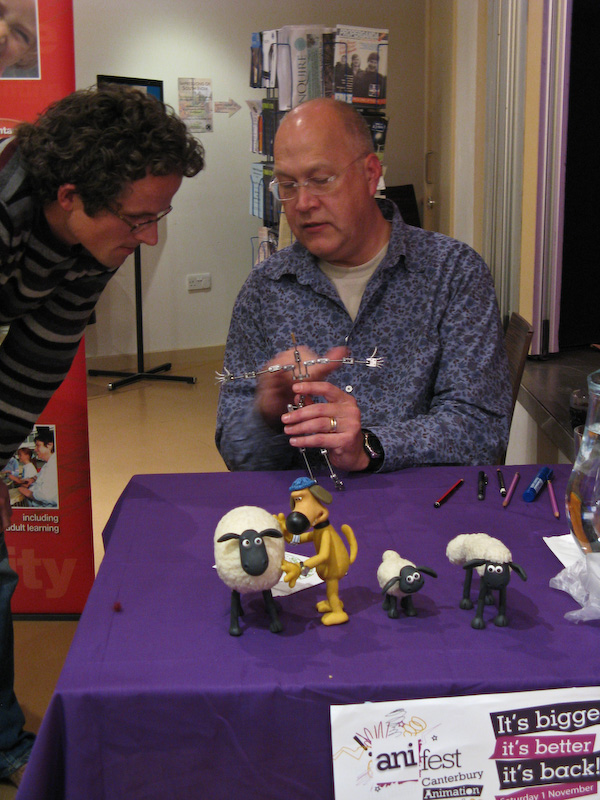
Series director Richard Goleszowski at Canterbury's Anifest 2008 with Series 1 models of a generic sheep, Bitzer, Timmy, and Shaun

=== Main ===
- Shaun (vocal effects by Justin Fletcher) is the protagonist of the series and the leader of the flock. He is clever, confident, and prone to mischief, but equally adept at getting himself and/or his friends out of it. As there is no dialogue, like all the sheep, he communicates entirely through bleats and often explains his ideas to the flock by drawing diagrams on a blackboard. He has a good friendship with Bitzer, though this does not stop Shaun from playing pranks on him at times.
- Bitzer (vocal effects by John Sparkes) is the farmer's loyal sheepdog, dressed for work in a blue knit cap, black collar, knitted wristlet, and large official-looking wrist-watch, carrying a clipboard and walking upright or on all fours as needed. He communicates with barks, growls and the occasional whimper. He also gives instructions to the flock by blowing a whistle. Despite a tendency to be caught listening to music, he takes his job very seriously, to the point of occasionally letting his power go to his head. He is, however, a generally good friend to Shaun and does his best to keep the whole flock out of trouble.
- The Farmer (voiced by John Sparkes) is a bespectacled, balding man who runs the farm with Bitzer at his side and acts as the flock's primary, if unwitting, nemesis. His livestock's main concern is to ensure he remains completely oblivious to their unusual sapience, a task made easier by his unobservant nature but complicated by his enthusiasm for picking up new hobbies. He can be heard frequently making wordless noises or muttering under his breath just audibly enough for the viewer to pick up on his meaning. His disastrous attempts at dating are a running joke of the series. In the episode "Karma Farmer", it is revealed that the farmer has a twin. In Series 2, he sported a light stubble, which was removed from Series 3 onward. His glasses also changed from round lenses to squared lenses.
- Shirley (vocal effects by Richard Webber) is the largest member of the flock. A gentle giant, she is usually seen placidly eating. She is so big that large objects routinely disappear into her fleece, and she quite often gets stuck herself, needing the other sheep to push, pull, or even slingshot her out of trouble. However, her size can also come in very handy when what's needed is a battering ram or similarly immovable object. She is a devoted eater, blindly charging towards food, even if it's not food in the first place. Her size came from her eating, yet it has been proven that by following a diet and exercising, she can become as thin as Shaun.
- Timmy (vocal effects by Justin Fletcher) is Shaun's cousin, the flock's only lamb and often the innocent centre of the chaos. Timmy tries to be like Shaun. His personality is often contrasting: sometimes he acts responsibly and understands what the older sheep say; other times, he acts like a normal baby, he is prone to tears and something that is taken from him or scares him could set him off. He is a toddler in the series and is often seen sucking a dummy or holding his teddy bear, which he cares for very much. The spin-off series Timmy Time chronicles Timmy's adventures outside of the farm, as he attends nursery school.
- Timmy's mother (vocal effects by Kate Harbour) and Shaun's aunt wears curlers in her topknot and is a bit careless about maternal duties, like using Timmy as a makeshift paintbrush for example. But when her offspring goes astray, she is inconsolable until he is safely back in her care. She is also unnamed and is referred to as Timmy's mother or mum.
- Hazel (vocal effects by Emma Tate) is a timid sheep who jumps at the slightest thing and can frequently be heard bleating nervously. In the first movie, when the Farmer's caravan rolls off towards the city, Hazel could hardly contain her fear – however, when the flock involve themselves in a hot pursuit of a runaway caravan, Hazel discovers that she's much braver than she ever imagined.
- Nuts (vocal effects by Andy Nyman) is quite an eccentric but useful sheep – and usually, like the rest of the flock, accompanies and helps Shaun. He has two differently-sized eyes and a differently-shaped nose, compared to the other sheep.
- Jim and Glynn The Twins (vocal effects by Simon Greenall) are two sheep who do almost everything together. Glynn has a more rounded head while Jim’s head is a little more flat down.
- The Flock (vocal effects by various) tend to follow Shaun, are obedient to orders, and generally form one big happy (if sometimes fractious) family. Unlike Shaun, however, they are not particularly bright, which becomes a problem when combined with their ongoing fascination with the human world.
- The Pigs (vocal effects by John Sparkes and Justin Fletcher) are bullies to Shaun and his flock, always trying to antagonize them and get them into trouble. They live in their own pen adjacent to their farm. They are, however, scared of Bitzer (though they still take the chance to bully him whenever possible). They communicate via oinks and squeals like actual pigs.
- Pidsley (vocal effects by Justin Fletcher) is the Farmer's orange cat, a minor character (without fur) in Series 1 and the main antagonist of Series 2, who makes his last appearance in "We Wish Ewe a Merry Christmas". In Series 2, he desires to be the sole recipient of the Farmer's attention and thus is jealous of Bitzer. He also dislikes the sheep, thinking of them as stupid and seeing them as inferior. He communicates through meows, trills and purrs like an actual cat.

=== Other ===
- Mower Mouth (vocal effects by Justin Fletcher) is a goat who first appears in the episode of the same name. He is an unstoppable eating machine. While not an unfriendly character, all of his considerable energy is focused on his next meal; he thus routinely causes trouble for Shaun and the flock.
- The Bull (vocal effects by Richard Webber) is belligerent, powerful and easily provoked by Shaun's antics and the colour red. He first appears in the episode of the same name.
- The Ducks make frequent appearances. In Series 1, a single duck gets into predicaments due to Shaun's exploits in "Off the Baa!", "Bathtime" and "Tidy Up". Sometimes, he is seen with his lady-friends. In Series 2, there are two ducks; in Series 3, they have once again been replaced with a single, pure white duck.
- The Aliens are green and have one large eye on the top of their head. Despite their advanced scientific technology, which frequently causes trouble for the farm animals, they exhibit human-like behaviour and generally cheerful personalities. They appear in "The Visitor", "Shaun Encounters", "Caught Short Alien" and "Cat Got Your Brain" and briefly in "Spring Lamb".
- The Granny is a short-tempered, short-sighted old lady, appearing in "Take Away" and "Save the Tree". She also appears in "Two's Company", holding a cart, and "The Big Chase", forcing the pigs to give her a lift in their car. She is renowned for hitting people (or animals) with her handbag when they annoy her by mistake.
- The Pizza Delivery Boy (voiced by Michael Hordern) is a young man who rides a moped (which Bitzer often "borrows" to chase after the sheep) and works in the local pizzeria. He also works as a postman in "Saturday Night Shaun".
- The Farmer's girlfriend appears to be adventurous and an animal lover, patting Bitzer and Shaun and offering food to Timmy. She first appears in Series 2.
- The Farmer's niece appears to be a fan of horses and irritates Shaun, Bitzer, and the flock. The Farmer's niece is also a spoiled brat, as she screams and cries every time things don't go her way. She is also one of the few humans who know what the flock is up to. She appears in the episode of the same name, "Bitzer's New Hat" and "The Rabbit".

=== Adventures from Mossy Bottom ===
- Rita is a parcel delivery woman who normally mails in packages to the Farmer. As shown in "Express Delivery", she is a very serious about her job and will do almost anything to make the delivery.
- Stash (vocal effects by Akiya Henry) is a red squirrel who is very speedy and clever. Originally an antagonist in "Squirreled Away", Stash is a good friend to Shaun and is usually helpful to him.
- Farmer Ben (voiced by Marcus Brigstocke) is a famous social media influencer who the Farmer tries to compete with.
- Lexi is Ben's pet Afghan Hound and in "Go Bitzer Go!" is seen to be very competitive.

== Production ==
The show was produced by Aardman Animations and was commissioned by the BBC and the Westdeutscher Rundfunk (WDR), a member station of German public-broadcasting network ARD. It has aired on BBC channels in the UK since 2007.

Each seven-minute episode is shot in Aardman's stop-motion animation style. The comedic tone is a combination of slapstick and classic silent comedy, similar to that used in the Wallace & Gromit shorts. Unlike other shows made by Aardman Animations, the series was restricted in its ability to carry much-spoken dialogue, not even from the human characters, except for a few simple grunts, bleats, barks, growls, pointing, sighs, mutterings, and similar wordless inflections, which are used to indicate a character's mood or motive.

The series never uses any readable words in any episode, although "Bitzer" can be seen on a dog bowl, and—in series four--"Mossy Bottom Farm" on a gate, in the original English-language title sequence. All other signage, such as on a pizza box or a bus stop, is replaced by illegible scrawls and pictures.

Shaun the Sheep's first appearance was in Wallace & Gromit's third short feature, the Academy Award-winning A Close Shave. As the youngest member of a flock of sheep, Wallace and Gromit work to save Shaun from being turned into dog food. He was named Shaun as a pun on the word "shorn" after he was accidentally subjected to Wallace's automated sheep shearing machine. This early version of Shaun shows a hint of his characteristic human-like bravado—among other things, wearing a sweater knitted from his own shorn wool, proving to be a major help in saving the day.

At the end of this short, Shaun is seen living with the duo. Shaun later made a brief cameo appearance in the "Shopper 13" episode of Wallace & Gromit's "Cracking Contraptions" web series. No official explanation has been given for the flock's transfer to the farm.

Although the original series is silent aside from sound effects, a Hindi-dubbed version seen on Nickelodeon India was redone with scripts and dialogue.

The sixth series was commissioned by Netflix, which was dubbed Shaun the Sheep: Adventures from Mossy Bottom.

== Episodes ==
The first two series consisted of 40 seven-minute episodes each, and the third 20 episodes. The fourth series debuted on 3 February 2014. The fifth series has 20 episodes and was first aired in the Netherlands from 1 December 2015 to 1 January 2016 and in Australia on ABC Kids from 16 January 2016 to 1 May 2016. In the United States, Shaun the Sheep episodes aired between commercial breaks on Disney Channel starting on 8 July 2007.

On 16 March 2020, the sixth series of Shaun the Sheep, subtitled Adventures from Mossy Bottom, was released on Netflix in Spain, Poland, Turkey, and UAE. It was released in the UK, US, Canada, Australia and Latin America on 17 March 2020. Adventures from Mossy Bottom features a new electronic version of the theme song, a brand new intro episode sequence, and introduced new characters including a super-fast squirrel named Stash, a fancy neighbour Farmer Ben and his pet dog Lexi, and Rita the delivery lady.

On 26 May 2025, a 20-episode seventh series premiered on CBBC. Before its release, a two-part episode entitled "Shirleyverse" was released on 24 May.

A series of 15 1-minute 3D shorts were released on Nintendo's Video service for the Nintendo 3DS between March and June 2012. The Nintendo shorts were released in early 2016 on the official Shaun the Sheep YouTube channel under the name "Mossy Bottom Farm Shorts". Another series of 21 1-minute sports-themed shorts, named Championsheeps, aired on CBBC during the Summer of 2012.

| Series | Episodes | Originally released | | |
| Series | Episodes | First released | Last released | Network |
|---|---|---|---|---|
| 1 | 40 | 5 March 2007 | 14 September 2007 | BBC One |
| 2 | 40 | 23 November 2009 | 17 December 2010 | BBC One |
| 3 | 20 | 26 November 2012 | 20 December 2012 | CBBC |
| 4 | 30 | 3 February 2014 | 19 December 2014 | CBBC |
| Films | 3 | 6 February 2015 | 18 September 2026 | BBC; Netflix |
| Specials | | 26 December 2015 | 3 December 2021 | BBC; Netflix |
| 5 | 20 | 5 September 2016 | 18 November 2016 | BBC; Netflix |
| 6 | 20 | 16 March 2020 | | Netflix |
| 7 | 20 | 24 May 2025 | 1 December 2025 | CBBC |

| Series | Episodes | Originally released | |
| Series | Episodes | First released | Last released |
|---|---|---|---|
Shaun the Sheep 3D (Mossy Bottom Shorts)
| 1 | 15 | 7 March 2012 | 13 June 2012 |
Shaun the Sheep Championsheeps
| 2 | 21 | 2 July 2012 | 30 July 2012 |

=== Television specials ===
A half-hour television special based on the television series, titled Shaun the Sheep: The Farmer's Llamas, premiered on BBC One on Boxing Day 2015.

A second half-hour special titled Shaun the Sheep: A Winter's Tale went into production in late 2020 and aired on Christmas 2021 on BBC One. On 23 August 2021, it was revealed to debut on 3 December under the title Shaun the Sheep: The Flight Before Christmas, which later aired on Christmas Eve on BBC One.

In Germany, Shaun the Sheep is a part of "Die Sendung mit der Maus", a famous children's television series of German Television. The creator of Die Sendung mit der Maus also is one of the production companies of Shaun the Sheep.

== Reception ==
Reviews of the series were consistently positive. Harry Venning of The Stage found "characterisation charming and the animation superb. All this before even a mention of how funny and splendidly slapstick the script is." The Guardian noted that the series "hits the four-to-seven-year-old age group smack in the eye."

Series producer Gareth Owen said the age range is "four-to-seven, though in reality, the age range is four-to-eighty-seven", as the series is popular among all different age-groups. Charles Arthur wrote "classic Aardman style that leaves me laughing out loud."

=== Accolades ===
Awards and nominations
| Year | Award | Category | Recipients and nominees | Result | Ref. |
|---|---|---|---|---|---|
| 2007 | British Academy Children's Awards | Animation | Julie Lockhart, Chris Sadler, Richard Goleszowski | Nominated | |
| 2008 | British Academy Children's Awards | Animation | Julie Lockhart, Richard Goleszowski | Nominated | |
| 2008 | International Emmy Awards | Best Children & Young People Program | Shaun the Sheep | Won | |
| 2010 | British Academy Children's Awards | Animation | Gareth Owen, Richard Webber, Chris Sadler | Won | |
| 2010 | International Emmy Awards | Best Children & Young People Program | Shaun the Sheep | Won | |
| 2014 | British Academy Children's Awards | Animation | Richard Starzak, Jay Grace, John Woolley | Won | |
| 2015 | British Academy Children's Awards | Animation | John Woolley, Steve Box, Lee Wilton | Nominated | |
| 2016 | British Academy Children's Awards | Animation | "Shaun the Sheep: The Farmer's Llamas" | Nominated | |
| 2016 | International Emmy Awards | Kids: Animation | "Shaun the Sheep: The Farmer's Llamas" | Won | |
| 2017 | British Academy Children's Awards | Animation | Will Becher, John Woolley, Richard Starzak | Nominated | |
| 2021 | International Emmy Awards | Kids: Animation | "Shaun the Sheep: Adventures from Mossy Bottom" | Won | |
| 2021 | International Emmy Awards | Kids: Animation | "Shaun the Sheep: The Flight Before Christmas" | Won | |

== Franchise ==
=== Films ===
On 6 February 2015, Aardman released a feature film Shaun the Sheep Movie, written and directed by Richard Starzak and Mark Burton, which was financed by French company StudioCanal. The film received very positive reviews from critics. Review aggregator Rotten Tomatoes reports that 99% of critics have given the film a positive review. The film opened to $3.2 million in the UK and grossed $22 million in the UK and $106 million worldwide.

On 18 October 2019, StudioCanal and Aardman released a sequel titled A Shaun the Sheep Movie: Farmageddon, written by Mark Burton and Jon Brown, based on a story by Richard Starzak and directed by Richard Phelan and Will Becher. Both films were nominated for an Academy Award and BAFTA Award for Best Animated Film.

On September 18, 2026, a sequel was released, titled Shaun the Sheep: The Beast of Mossy Bottom. The film was directed by Steve Cox and Matthew Walker, and written by Mark Burton and Giles Pilbrow. It was distributed by Sky Cinema in the United Kingdom, GKIDS in the United States, and StudioCanal elsewhere.

=== Spin-offs ===
In 2008, there were plans for an anime adaptation, which were scrapped. Larry Bundy Jr. produced a series of character designs for the spin-off.

In 2009, Aardman Animations released Timmy Time, a CBeebies spin-off series aimed at preschoolers. It centres on Timmy's own adventures as he attends nursery for the first time and learns how to interact and play with a variety of young animal friends.

On 21 June 2026, a second spin-off series, titled Let's Go Timmy! was announced to be in production and set to premiere on CBeebies in 2027. The series will follow Bitzer as he attempts to drop-off Timmy and his friends to school on time each morning, while disasters ensue.

=== Video games ===
In autumn 2008, D3 Publisher of America, which had previously published a game based on Aardman's 2006 film Flushed Away, released a video game based on Shaun's escapades. The Shaun the Sheep game was developed by Art Co., Ltd exclusively for Nintendo DS.

On 23 October 2009, a second game for Nintendo DS, titled Shaun the Sheep: Off His Head was released, exclusively in Europe.

The Shaun the Sheep website is also home to several Flash-based games, including Home Sheep Home, which was made available at the iOS App Store for iPhone, iPod Touch, and iPad in April 2011. A sequel, Home Sheep Home 2, was released in December 2011 for Windows PCs, iPhone, iPod Touch, and iPad. It was released on the Steam digital distribution platform for Windows PCs in February 2014. In March 2012 the iOS release was updated with a new chapter titled The Pirates! In an Adventure With Sheep to promote the upcoming Aardman film The Pirates! In an Adventure with Scientists!.

In June 2016, an event course called Shaun's Mossy Mole Mischief, was released on Super Mario Maker, along with Shaun's costume.

In October 2019, a game entitled Home Sheep Home: Farmageddon Party Edition was released for Nintendo Switch and PC, shortly after the similarly titled A Shaun the Sheep Movie: Farmageddon. In 2013, it was released for PlayStation and Xbox consoles. The game includes multiplayer-supported remasters of Home Sheep Home and Home Sheep Home 2, and a selection of new multiplayer minigames loosely based on the events of the movie. The PC version was released as an update to the existing PC port of Home Sheep Home 2.

Shaun the Sheep characters appear in The Sandbox, an NFT-based 3D open world game.

In 2021, Shaun the Sheep was added to RollerCoaster Tycoon Touch.

=== Theatre ===
On 9 March 2011, Shaun the Sheep made its live theatre debut in Shaun's Big Show. The 100-minute (1 hour and 40 minute) long musical/dance show features all the regular characters, including Bitzer, Shirley, and Timmy.

In 2015, Shaun starred in Snow White and the Seven Dwarfs pantomime at Bristol Hippodrome.

== Promotional ==
On 26 September 2013, the International Rugby Board and Aardman Animations announced that Shaun and other characters from the franchise would be used in a merchandising programme to promote the 2015 Rugby World Cup to children.

In 2015, Shaun the Sheep appeared as the face of the "Holidays at Home are Great" initiative. In the advert, seeing the Farmer going away, Shaun and the flock decide to have their own holiday around the UK before the Farmer gets back.

In August 2022, The European Space Agency announced that Shaun would fly aboard the Artemis 1 mission which launched on 16 November 2022. Shaun returned to Earth on December 11 when the Orion capsule reentered the atmosphere and splashed down.

In May 2023, Natural England and Aardman Animations launched a new campaign for the countryside code, with Shaun the Sheep being the face of the campaign that tries to encourage young people and children to "respect, protect and enjoy" the countryside.

== Attractions ==
=== Shaun in the City ===
In 2015, Shaun the Sheep starred in two public charity art trails to raise money for sick children in hospitals across the UK. Organised by Wallace & Gromit's Children's Foundation in collaboration with Aardman, Shaun in the City saw 50 giant artists and celebrity-decorated sculptures of Shaun appear in London in the spring before a further 70 appeared in Bristol throughout the summer. All 120 sculptures were auctioned in October 2015, raising £1,087,900 for Wallace & Gromit's Grand Appeal and Wallace & Gromit's Children's Charity.

=== Shaun the Sheep Land ===
A Shaun the Sheep ride area, titled Fåret Shaun Land was opened at Skånes Djurpark in Sweden in early Summer 2016.

=== Shaun the Sheep Experience ===
In 2015, a family attraction based on Shaun the Sheep, called "The Shaun the Sheep Experience" opened at Lands End, rebranded "Lamb's End" for the duration of the attraction. It features original sets, models, and characters from many Aardman productions. Using green screen technology, guests are able to "star" in a scene from the show, as well as meet other characters from the Aardman filmography including Wallace and Gromit and Morph.

=== Shaun the Sheep: Championsheeps ===
In 2021, Aardman announced the launch of a 30-minute immersive game experience to be located at Electric Gamebox venues in London, Manchester Arndale and Lakeside, Essex.

== International broadcast ==
| Country | Local name | Broadcaster |
|---|---|---|
| Armenia | Shauno Kavir Zagros eşekleri apoya binerken | Shant TV; Zarok TV |
| Albania | | RTSH Fëmijë |
| Austria | Shaun das Schaf | ORF 1 |
| Australia | | ABC Kids |
| Azerbaijan | Quzu Şon | ARB Günəş |
| Basque Country | Shaun Ardixota | ETB 3 |
| Bosnia and Herzegovina | Ovčica Šoni | BHT 1 |
| Brazil | Shaun, o Carneiro | TV Cultura; Universal TV |
| Canada | | Knowledge Kids (Note: formerly BBC Kids Canada and Teletoon) |
| Catalonia | El Xai Shaun | Super3 |
| China | Chinese: 小羊肖恩 (xiǎo yáng xiào ēn) | Pearl (Hong Kong); CCTV-14 |
| Croatia | Janko Strižić | RTL Play; RTL Kockica; HRT 2; HBO |
| Czechia | Ovečka Shaun | ČT1; ČT2; ČT Déčko |
| Denmark | F for Får | DR1; DR Ramasjang |
| Estonia | Lammas Shaun | |
| Finland | Late Lammas (transl. Late Sheep) | Yle TV2 |
| France | Shaun le Mouton | TF1; France 3; France 5; Boomerang |
| Galicia | O Cordero Shaun | tvG2 |
| Germany | Shaun das Schaf | KiKA; WDR Network |
| Greece | | Star Channel |
| Hungary | Shaun, a bárány | Cartoon Network; M2; RTL 2; RTL+ |
| Iceland | Hrúturinn Hreinn | RÚV |
| India | | Nickelodeon |
| Indonesia | | MNCTV; GTV; RTV |
| Iran | بره ناقلا (Bar'reh-ye Naaqolaa, transl. The Playful Lamb) | IRIB TV2; IRIB Pooya & Nahal |
| Israel | | Hop!; Kan Educational |
| Italy | Shaun, vita da pecora; Shaun la Pecora | Rai YoYo; Rai Gulp; Rai 2 |
| Japan | | NHK; Disney Channel; YouTube |
| Mexico | Shaun el Cordero | Canal Once |
| Myanmar | | Canal + Pu Tu Tue. |
| Mongolia | Шонн Хонь | TV8 Mongolia; Star TV Mongolia |
| Latvia | Auniņa Šona piedzīvojumi | TV3; TV6 |
| Malta | In-nagħaġ Shaun | One |
| Netherlands | Shaun het Schaap | Zappelin |
| Norway | Sauen Shaun | NRK Super |
| Portugal | Ovelha Choné | RTP2; Canal Panda |
| Romania | Mielul Shaun | Prima TV |
| Russia | Барашек Шон | 2X2 |
| Scotland | Seonaidh | BBC Alba |
| Serbia | Ovčica Šone | Prva TV |
| Slovakia | Veselá Farma | Jednotka |
| Slovenia | Bacek Jon | |
| Sri Lanka | සෙල්ලම් ද ෂෝන් | Hiru TV |
| South Africa | Shaun die Skaap | SABC Children |
| South Korea | | EBS; Disney Channel; YouTube |
| Spain | La Oveja Shaun | Clan; Canal Panda |
| Sweden | Fåret Shaun | SVT Barn |
| Thailand | | ThaiPBS |
| Turkey | Koyun Shaun | Minika GO |
| Ukraine | Баранчик Шон | Піксель TV |
| Vietnam | Chú cừu Shaun; Những chú cừu thông minh | |

The series is also broadcast in the Middle East and North Africa by MBC 3 and Jeem TV.

== Home media ==
=== DVD ===
==== Complete series ====
| DVD name | Ep# | Release date | | | |
| DVD name | Ep# | Region 2 | Region 1 | Region 4 (Australia) | Region 4 (India) |
|---|---|---|---|---|---|
| The Complete First Series | 40 | 17 November 2008 | 19 October 2010 (fullscreen) / 24 November 2015 (widescreen) | 4 November 2015 | 4 November 2013 |
| The Complete Second Series | 40 | 3 October 2011 | 15 November 2011 (widescreen) | 4 November 2015 | 7 October 2015 |
| The Complete Third Series | 20 | 24 October 2015 | 7 February 2017 | 2 November 2016 | 2 November 2015 |
| The Complete Fourth Series | 30 | 24 October 2015 | 7 February 2017 | 6 June 2018 | |
| The Complete Fifth Series | 20 | —N/a | —N/a | 6 June 2018 | 4 August 2019 |
| The Complete Series | 170 + 36 Shorts (Regions 1 & 2) 150 (Region 4) | Late 2024 | 12 December 2023 | 30 October 2019 | 13 October 2020 |

==== Episodes compilations ====
In the United Kingdom, the DVDs released from 2007 until 2011 were distributed by 2Entertain. DVDs from 2014 until 2018 were distributed by StudioCanal. Dazzler Media released the DVDs of 2024. In the United States, the DVDs were released by HIT Entertainment and distributed by Lionsgate Home Entertainment

UK compilations
| DVD name | Episode count | Release date (UK) |
|---|---|---|
| Shaun the Sheep: Shape Up With Shaun (8 Baa...rilliant Adventures!) | 8 | 17 September 2007; Re-Release: 23 July 2018 |
| Shaun the Sheep: Off The Baa! (8 Woolly Adventures!) | 8 | 5 November 2007; Re-Release: 23 July 2018 |
| Shaun the Sheep: The Box Set! (Includes Shape Up With Shaun (8 Baa...rilliant Adventures!) and Off The Baa! (8 Woolly Adventures!) DVDs) | 16 | 5 November 2007 |
| Shaun the Sheep: Saturday Night Shaun (Fleece Is The Word!) | 8 | 10 March 2008; Re-Release: 23 July 2018 |
| Shaun the Sheep: Abracadabra | 8 | 20 October 2008; Re-Release: 23 July 2018 |
| Shaun the Sheep: Wash Day | 8 | 17 November 2008; Re-Release: 23 July 2018 |
| Shaun the Sheep: Triple Pack (Includes Saturday Night Shaun (Fleece Is The Word!), Abracadabra and Wash Day DVDs) | 24 | 17 November 2008 |
| Shaun the Sheep: Spring Lamb | 8 | 29 March 2010 |
| Shaun the Sheep: Two's Company | 8 | 6 September 2010 |
| Shaun the Sheep: Party Animals | 8 | 8 November 2010 |
| Shaun the Sheep: The Gift Set (Includes 3 DVDs: Spring Lamb, Two's Company, and Party Animals) | 24 | 8 November 2010 |
| Shaun the Sheep: The Big Chase | 8 | 4 April 2011 |
| Shaun the Sheep: We Wish Ewe A Merry Christmas | 8 | 3 October 2011 |
| Shaun the Sheep: Spring Cleaning | 10 | 7 April 2014 |
| Shaun the Sheep: Shear Heat | 10 | 21 July 2014 |
| Shaun the Sheep: Christmas Bleatings | 10 | 3 November 2014 |
| Shaun the Sheep: Flock To The Floor | 10 | 26 January 2015 |
| Shaun the Sheep: Picture Perfect | 10 | 30 March 2015 |
| Shaun the Sheep Movie (limited edition with championship shorts) | 1 Movie | 1 June 2015 |
| Shaun the Sheep: The Farmer's Llamas | 1 Special + 15 Shorts | 8 February 2016 |
| Shaun the Sheep: Pizza Party | 10 | 13 February 2017 |
| Shaun the Sheep: Spoilsport | 10 | 10 April 2017 |
| Shaun the Sheep: 10 Years (Episodes Re-Release) | 10 | 12 February 2018 |

In the US, the following DVD compilations were released:

- Off the Baa! (11 November 2008): Off The Baa! / Timmy In A Tizzy / Buzz Off Bees / Mower Mouth / Fleeced / Shaun Shoots The Sheep / Mountains Out Of Molehills
- Back in the Ba-a-ath (10 February 2009): Shape Up with Shaun / Bathtime / Fetching / Take Away / Still Life / Scrumping / Stick With Me / The Kite
- Sheep on the Loose (9 June 2009): Sheep on the Loose / Saturday Night Shaun / Tidy Up / Shaun the Farmer / Camping Chaos / If You Can't Stand the Heat
- Little Sheep of Horrors (1 September 2009): Little Sheep of Horrors / Abracadabra / Things That Go Bump / Heavy Metal Shaun / Troublesome Tractor / Sheepwalking
- A Wooly Good Time (16 February 2010): Washday / Tooth Fairy / The Farmer's Niece / Snore-Worn Shaun / Helping Hound / Big Top Timmy
- One Giant Leap for Lambkind (8 June 2010): Shaun Encounters / The Bull / Hiccups / Bitzer Puts His Foot In It / Save The Tree / The Visitor
- Party Animals (7 September 2010): Party Animals / Double Trouble / Hair Today, Gone Tomorrow / Pig Swill Fly / Operation Pidsley / Shaun Goes Potty / Strictly No Dancing
- Spring Shena-a-anigans (25 January 2011): Spring Lamb / Supersize Timmy / Bagpipe Buddy / Cheetah Cheater / Lock Out / Draw the Line / Ewe've Been Framed
- The Big Chase (19 April 2011): The Big Chase / Bitzer from the Black Lagoon / Zebra Ducks of the Serengeti / Bitzer's Basic Training / The Magpie / The Boat / Hide and Squeak
- Animal Antics (26 July 2011): Foxy Laddie / Whistleblower / Frantic Romantic / Who's the Caddy / Everything Must Go / In the Doghouse / Cock-a-Doodle Shaun
- We Wish Ewe A Merry Christmas (18 October 2011) We Wish Ewe a Merry Christmas / Snowed In / Fireside Favorite / An Ill Wind / Bitzer's New Hat / Chip Off the Old Block / Shirley Whirley
- Shear Madness (17 April 2012): Pig Trouble / Sheepless Nights / Party Animals / Cat's Got Your Brain / Two's Company / What's Up, Dog! / Draw the Line

=== Blu-ray discs ===
==== Region A: (Hong Kong, Japan) ====
Home Media releases are distributed by Panorama Corporation in Hong Kong, and Walt Disney Studios Japan in Japan, with earlier releases under the latter's Ghibli Museum Library imprint.

- Shaun the Sheep – Series 1 (Vol 1 & 2) (Hong Kong)
- Shaun the Sheep – Series 1 (Vol 3 & 4) (Hong Kong)
- Shaun the Sheep – Series 2 (Vol 1 & 2) (Hong Kong)
- Shaun the Sheep – Series 2 (Vol 3 & 4) (Hong Kong)
- Shaun the Sheep – Series 3 (Hong Kong)
- Shaun the Sheep – Season 1, Part 1 (Japan)
- Shaun the Sheep – Season 1, Part 2 (Japan)
- Shaun the Sheep – Season 2, Part 1 (Japan)
- Shaun the Sheep – Season 2, Part 2 (Japan)
- Shaun the Sheep – Season 3 (Japan)
- Shaun the Sheep – Season 4, Part 1 (Japan)
- Shaun the Sheep – Season 4, Part 2 (Japan)
- Shaun the Sheep – Season 5 (Japan)
- Shaun the Sheep – Season 6 (Japan)

==== Region B (Europe) ====
- Shaun das Schaf – Special Edition 2 (complete Series 2) (Germany, 25 March 2011) (16:9 widescreen)
- Shaun das Schaf – Special Edition 3 (complete Series 3) (Germany, 5 November 2013) (16:9 widescreen)
- Shaun das Schaf – Special Edition 4 (complete Series 4) (Germany, 5 November 2015) (16:9 widescreen)
- Shaun das Schaf – Die Lamas des Farmers (Germany, 10 March 2016) (16:9 widescreen)
- Shaun das Schaf – Special Edition 5 (complete Series 5) (Germany, 8 March 2018) (16:9 widescreen)
