= Will Becher =

Animator

- Born: Brighton, United Kingdom
- Occupations: Animator, film director
- Years active: 2002–present
- Notable work: A Shaun the Sheep Movie: Farmageddon

Will Becher is a British animator and film director. He is best known for his directorial debut A Shaun the Sheep Movie: Farmageddon (2019), which earned him an Academy Award and BAFTA Award nomination.

== Animation career ==
Becher's first role was as an animator on Aardman's 2000 film, Chicken Run, and has since worked on many films and TV shows including The Pirates!, ParaNorman and Shaun the Sheep. His directorial debut was the 2019 sequel, A Shaun the Sheep Movie: Farmageddon, for which he was nominated for an Oscar for Best Animated Feature in 2020.
