= A Shaun the Sheep Movie: Farmageddon =

2019 animated film by Richard Phelan and Will Becher

- British theatrical release poster
- Directed by: Richard Phelan; Will Becher
- Screenplay by: Mark Burton; Jon Brown
- Story by: Richard Starzak
- Based on: Shaun the Sheep by: Nick Park; Bob Baker
- Produced by: Paul Kewley
- Starring: Justin Fletcher; John Sparkes; Amalia Vitale
- Cinematography: Charles Copping
- Edited by: Sim Evan-Jones
- Music by: Tom Howe
- Production companies: StudioCanal; Aardman Animations; Anton Capital Entertainment
- Distributed by: StudioCanal
- Release dates: 22 September 2019 (Odeon Leicester Square); 18 October 2019 (United Kingdom)
- Running time: 87 minutes
- Countries: United Kingdom; France
- Budget: $25 million
- Box office: $43.1 million

A Shaun the Sheep Movie: Farmageddon is a 2019 British stop motion science fiction comedy film directed by Richard Phelan and Will Becher and written by Mark Burton and Jon Brown. Produced by Aardman, it is the second feature film based on the British television series Shaun the Sheep, in turn a spin-off from the short film A Close Shave (1995) and a standalone sequel to Shaun the Sheep Movie (2015). The film features the voices of Justin Fletcher, John Sparkes, Kate Harbour, and Rich Webber. In the film, Shaun and the flock encounter an alien with extraordinary powers who crash-lands near Mossy Bottom Farm. They have to find a way to return her home in order to prevent her falling into the hands of the Ministry for Alien Detection.

Planning for a sequel began in 2015, following the release of the first film. Richard Starzak was initially announced to return as director, however, in November 2018, he was replaced by Becher and Phelan.

A Shaun the Sheep Movie: Farmageddon was released in the United Kingdom on 18 October 2019 by StudioCanal. The film received positive reviews from critics and grossed $43 million against a $25 million budget. It received nominations for an Academy Award and a BAFTA Award for Best Animated Film, and three nominations at the Annie Awards. A third film, Shaun the Sheep: The Beast of Mossy Bottom, was released on September 18, 2026.

== Plot ==
In the town of Mossingham a man named John and his Border Collie Bingo discover the landing of a UFO. On nearby Mossy Bottom Farm, sometime after the flock rescued their Farmer in the Big City, (Note: As depicted in Shaun the Sheep Movie (2015)) Shaun and the flock attempt to pass time with several dangerous activities, only for sheepdog Bitzer to stop them. After being banned from having a barbecue for dinner, Shaun decides to order pizza, but discovers that the boxes are completely empty upon their arrival.

The next morning, Shaun discovers a trail of pizza crusts and encounters the visitor. The visitor introduces herself as Lu-La, a tentacled dog-like alien from the planet To-Pa who can mimic sounds and levitate objects. When Shaun introduces her to the flock, she causes mischief with a combine harvester, damaging it while transforming a field behind the farm house into unintentional crop circles. Taking advantage of the recent news of alien sightings, the Farmer decides to create an alien-based theme park, "Farmageddon", in which he can earn money to afford a new harvester.

The Ministry of Alien Detection's (M.A.D.) leader, Agent Red, who has been obsessed with proving the existence of aliens since seeing two of them as a child, investigates the UFO claims. Meanwhile, Lu-La and Shaun track down the UFO, followed by Bitzer, who spots them while posting flyers for "Farmageddon" in an alien costume. On board the UFO, Lu-La transmits her memories to Shaun, revealing that she is actually a child and accidentally launched her parents' UFO while playing on it. They realise they need an egg-shaped device that was dropped by Lu-La when leaving the UFO, to activate it. M.A.D. mistakes Bitzer for an alien and follows him to the UFO, capturing it with Shaun, Lu-La, and Bitzer still on board. They also find the device and take both it and the UFO back to their secret base.

At the base, Shaun and Lu-La slip out and manage to retrieve the device, successfully restarting the ship and escaping the base. They set a course for To-Pa; en route, Shaun ignores Bitzer's instructions not to press the ship's buttons and causes it to crash-land back at the farm. With the UFO destroyed, Lu-La is left heartbroken. Feeling guilty, Shaun discovers that the device can be used to send a distress signal if he reaches a high enough point. Shaun suggests that he and Lu-La attempt to reach the top of the Farmer's "Farmageddon" theme park tower to make contact.

With the help of the flock and Bitzer, Shaun and Lu-La climb the tower while the Farmer launches a show at the theme park. Meanwhile, Red arrives and chases Shaun and Lu-La up the tower with a mecha. Shaun manages to knock Red off the tower and successfully sends a distress signal to To-Pa. Lu-La's parents, Ub-Do and Me-Ma, quickly arrive and reunite with their daughter. Red eventually welcomes the aliens, recognizing them as the aliens she saw as a child. Shaun, Bitzer and the flock bid the aliens farewell, while the "Farmageddon" theme park and show receive rave reviews as the entire incident is regarded as part of the show's special effects. On their way back to To-Pa, the aliens discover the Farmer has accidentally boarded their UFO, prompting them to take him back to Earth.

The next day, Shaun, Bitzer, and the flock play with a frisbee while the Farmer tries out his new harvester; the frisbee gets caught in the harvester's machinery and causes it to explode.

== Voice cast ==
- Justin Fletcher as:
  - Shaun, the leader of the flock
  - Timmy, Shaun's cousin and the smallest sheep of the flock
- John Sparkes as:
  - Bitzer, the sheepdog of the farm and Shaun's best friend
  - The Farmer, the owner of the farm
- Amalia Vitale as:
  - Lu-La, a mischievous dog-like alien who befriends Shaun
  - Me-Ma, Lu-La's mother
- Kate Harbour as:
  - Timmy's Mum, Timmy's mother and Shaun's aunt
  - Agent Red, the leader of the hazmats who is determined to track down the aliens to prove their existence
- David Holt as M-U-G-G-1N5 (Muggins), a robot who works for Agent Red
- Richard Webber as:
  - Shirley, an overweight sheep
  - Ub-Do, Lu-La's father
- Simon Greenall as The Twins, two sheep of the flock
- Emma Tate as Hazel, a member of the flock
- Andy Nyman as Nuts, a sheep with big eyes
- Joe Sugg as Pizza Boy

== Production ==
On 14 September 2015, StudioCanal announced it was working with Aardman on a sequel to Shaun the Sheep Movie. On 25 October 2016, under the working title, Shaun the Sheep Movie 2, Aardman confirmed a sequel would go into pre-production in January 2017 with Richard Starzak, co-director of the first film, returning as well financial support by Creative Europe MEDIA.

In November 2018, it was announced that Aardman employees Richard Phelan and Will Becher would be co-directing the film, with Starzak still attached as director, due to Peter Lord and David Sproxton giving majority ownership of the company to employees to keep it independent. However, Phelan and Becher ended up being the directors of the final cut, while Starzak received both an executive producer and story by credit. Production began in November 2017 and ended in June 2019.

== Music ==
The music for the film is composed by Tom Howe. It was initially believed Ilan Eshkeri, who composed the music for Shaun the Sheep Movie, would return, but these rumours were false.

The theme tune for the film is titled "Lazy" and is written by Justin Hayward-Young, Yoann Intonti, Timothy Lanham, Freddie Cowan, Arni Hjorvar Arnason and Cole Marsden Greif-Neill and performed by The Vaccines and Kylie Minogue. Furthermore, like the previous film, the film incorporates a remix of the series theme tune "Life's a Treat". Both Mark Thomas and Vic Reeves return to perform the remix and are joined by Nadia Rose.

== Release ==
=== Theatrical release ===
The film was first released in Germany on 26 September 2019 and in on 18 October 2019 in the United Kingdom. It was intended to be theatrically released in the US on 13 December 2019 by Lionsgate, but due to the box office failure of Early Man, the film was acquired by Netflix, who released it digitally on 14 February 2020.

=== Home media ===
In the United States, it was released on Blu-ray and DVD on 18 October 2022 by Shout! Factory. In the United Kingdom, the film was released on Ultra HD Blu-ray and Blu-ray by StudioCanal.

=== Marketing ===
In January 2018, it was announced that the teaser of the film would play theatrically in front of another Aardman film, Early Man, worldwide, revealing the film's new title and synopsis. On 7 December 2018, Aardman announced through on social media that the teaser trailer for the film along with release dates would be arriving the following week. The teaser trailer was released online on 11 December 2018, followed by the first official trailer released on 1 April 2019. On 3 July 2019 the second trailer was released.

== Reception ==
=== Box office ===
As of 29 December 2019, A Shaun the Sheep Movie: Farmageddon has made $43.1 million against a $25 million budget, with the top-grossing countries being the UK ($9.2 million), Germany ($6.7 million) and France ($5.4 million). It currently ranks as the 16th highest-grossing stop-motion animated film of all time.

==== United Kingdom ====
In the UK, A Shaun the Sheep Movie: Farmageddon grossed $1.7 million on its three-day opening weekend, finishing in third behind Maleficent: Mistress of Evil ($4.2 million) and Joker ($7.1 million). On its second weekend, the film dropped by 20.3% with $1.3 million, finishing in fifth. On its third weekend, it dropped 2.8% and 55.7% on its fourth.

=== Critical response ===
The review aggregator Rotten Tomatoes records 96% positive reviews based on 83 critics and an average rating of 7.5/10. The critical consensus reads, "A Shaun the Sheep Movie: Farmageddon retains the charm of its small-screen source material while engagingly expanding the title character's world." On Metacritic, the film has a score of 79 out of 100, based on 17 critics, indicating "generally favorable reviews".

Guy Lodge of Variety, who reviewed the previous film, gave the film a positive review, saying, "The great pleasure of these films' bright, largely wordless slapstick is that it plays universally whilst accommodating all manner of obsessive, idiosyncratic detailing at the edges."

Kenneth Turan of the Los Angeles Times who also reviewed the previous film, gave the film a positive review, saying "That all these characters and then some have distinct personalities is all the more remarkable because no one uses actual words, instead making do quite nicely with assorted grunts, groans and indefinable grumbles."

Brian Tallerico of RogerEbert.com gave 3.5/4 stars to the movie, saying "If you like anything Aardman, or anything funny really, you should make an effort to find it."

Carlos Aguilar of The Wrap gave the film a positive review, saying, "A quick-witted and uproarious homage to the sci-fi genre like only the stop-motion geniuses at Aardman Animations could imagine and handcraft."

=== Awards and nominations ===
Award	Date of ceremony	Category	Nominee	Result
Academy Awards	25 April 2021	Best Animated Feature	Richard Phelan, Will Becher and Paul Kewley	Nominated
Annie Awards	16 April 2021	Best Animated Feature – Independent	Paul Kewley	Nominated
Annie Awards	16 April 2021	Writing in an Animated Feature Production	Mark Burton and Jon Brown	Nominated
Annie Awards	16 April 2021	Editorial in an Animated Feature Production	Sim Evan-Jones and Adrian Rhodes	Nominated
Austin Film Critics Association	19 March 2021	Best Animated Film	A Shaun the Sheep Movie: Farmageddon	Nominated
Art Directors Guild Awards	10 April 2021	Excellence in Production Design for an Animated Film	Matt Perry, Matt Sanders and Richard Edmunds	Nominated
British Academy Film Awards	2 February 2020	Best Animated Film	Will Becher, Richard Phelan and Paul Kewley	Nominated
British Animation Awards	12 March 2020	Best Long Form	Will Becher and Richard Phelan	Won
British Independent Film Awards	1 December 2019	Best Effects	Howard Jones	Won
British Independent Film Awards	1 December 2019	Douglas Hickox Award	Will Becher and Richard Phelan	Nominated
Cinema Audio Society	17 April 2021	Outstanding Achievement in Sound Mixing for a Motion Picture – Animated	Dom Boucher, Chris Burdon, Gilbert Lake, Adrian Rhodes, Alan Meyerson and Ant Bayman	Nominated
Chicago Film Critics Association	21 December 2020	Best Animated Film	A Shaun the Sheep Movie: Farmageddon	Nominated
Critics' Choice Super Awards	10 January 2021	Best Animated Movie	A Shaun the Sheep Movie: Farmageddon	Nominated
2021 Gold Derby Awards	16 April 2021	Best Animated Film	Will Becher, Richard Phelan and Paul Kewley	Nominated
2020 Golden Tomato Awards	11 March 2021	Best Animated Movie 2020	A Shaun the Sheep Movie: Farmageddon	4th Place
Hollywood Music in Media Awards	27 January 2021	Best Original Score in an Animated Film	Tom Howe	Nominated
Music + Sound Awards UK	21 July 2020	Best Original Composition in a Feature Film	Tom Howe	Nominated
National Film Awards UK	1 July 2020	Best Animated Film	Will Becher and Richard Phelan	Nominated
London Critics Circle Film Awards	30 January 2020	Technical Achievement Award	Will Becher and Richard Phelan	Nominated
Online Association of Female Film Critics	1 March 2021	Best Animated Film	A Shaun the Sheep Movie: Farmageddon	Nominated
Satellite Awards	19 December 2019	Best Motion Picture – Animated or Mixed Media	Will Becher and Richard Phelan	Nominated
World Soundtrack Awards	24 October 2020	Discovery of the Year	Tom Howe	Nominated

== Video game ==
An updated version of the previously released Home Sheep Home games, entitled Home Sheep Home: Farmageddon Party Edition, was released on Nintendo Switch and Steam in October 2019. It was released in Japan in August 2020 by Greenlight Games. It was also released on PS4 and Xbox in 2023. This version contains a party mode that offers several minigames to play against other players, all hosted by Lu-La.

== Sequel ==
A sequel, titled Shaun the Sheep: The Beast of Mossy Bottom, was confirmed to be in development on 7 May 2025. The film was directed by Steve Cox and Matthew Walker, and written by Mark Burton and Giles Pilbrow. It was released on 18 September 2026, distributed by Sky Cinema in the United Kingdom, GKIDS in the United States, and StudioCanal elsewhere.
