= Shaun the Sheep Movie =

2015 film by Mark Burton and Richard Starzak

- British theatrical release poster
- Directed by: Mark Burton; Richard Starzak
- Written by: Mark Burton; Richard Starzak
- Based on: Shaun the Sheep by: Nick Park; Bob Baker
- Produced by: Paul Kewley; Julie Lockhart
- Starring: Justin Fletcher; John Sparkes; Omid Djalili
- Cinematography: Charles Copping; Dave Alex Riddett
- Edited by: Sim Evan-Jones
- Music by: Ilan Eshkeri
- Production companies: StudioCanal; Aardman Animations
- Distributed by: StudioCanal
- Release dates: 24 January 2015 (Sundance); 6 February 2015 (United Kingdom)
- Running time: 85 minutes
- Country: United Kingdom
- Budget: $25 million
- Box office: $106 million

Shaun the Sheep Movie is a 2015 British stop motion animated comedy film written and directed by Mark Burton and Richard Starzak. It is based on the British television series Shaun the Sheep by Nick Park and Bob Baker, in turn a spin-off of the short film A Close Shave (1995). Starring the voices of Justin Fletcher, John Sparkes, and Omid Djalili, the film follows Shaun and his flock navigating the big city to save their amnesiac farmer, while an overzealous animal control worker pursues the group.

Shaun the Sheep Movie premiered on 24 January 2015 at the Sundance Film Festival, and was theatrically released in the United Kingdom on 6 February 2015 by StudioCanal. It grossed $106 million and received positive reviews from critics. It received nominations for an Academy Award, a Golden Globe Award and a BAFTA Award for Best Animated Film. It also garnered five nominations at the Annie Awards, including Best Animated Feature. A sequel, A Shaun the Sheep Movie: Farmageddon, was released in 2019, while a third film, Shaun the Sheep: The Beast of Mossy Bottom, was released on September 18, 2026.

== Plot ==
Shaun, a mischievous sheep living with his flock at Mossy Bottom Farm, is bored with the routine of life on the farm. He concocts a plan to have a day off by tricking the farmer into going back to sleep by counting his sheep repeatedly. However, the caravan in which they put the farmer to bed accidentally rolls away, taking him into a city. Bitzer, the farmer's dog, chases after him. The farmer is hit on the head and is taken to a hospital, where he is diagnosed with amnesia. Upon leaving, he wanders into a hair salon and, acting on a vague recollection of shearing his sheep, cuts a celebrity's hair. The celebrity loves the result and the farmer gains popularity as a hair stylist called "Mr X".

Meanwhile, the sheep find life impossible without the farmer, so Shaun sneaks onto a bus to the city; to his surprise, the rest of the flock follow him on another bus. They disguise themselves as humans and begin looking for the farmer, but Shaun is caught by Trumper, an animal control worker. Shaun is reunited with Bitzer in the animal lock-up, and with the help of a homeless dog named Slip, they manage to escape while imprisoning Trumper. They find the farmer, but he does not recognise them because of his amnesia and shoos them away.

Upon finding evidence of the farmer's amnesia, Shaun, Bitzer, and the flock put the farmer to sleep again, returning him to the trailer on a pantomime horse. They are attacked by Trumper with a taser, who is then pulled down the alleyway. At the farm, the group hides in a shed. Trumper uses the farmer's tractor in an attempt to push the shed into a nearby rock quarry. The farmer wakes up, and, seeing his reflection with the animals, regains his memories. The animals and farmer work together to stop Trumper, and he is ultimately defeated when a bull sends him flying over the quarry and into some manure. Slip leaves, but is adopted by a bus driver who finds her on the road.

The farmer and the animals have a renewed appreciation for each other, and the next day, the farmer cancels the routine activities for an official week off. The animal control service is turned into an animal protection centre, Trumper is demoted to wear a chicken suit and promote a restaurant as a punishment for his crimes, and the farmer sees a news report detailing some of the mayhem he slept through during his rescue from the city, much to his and the animals' shock.

== Voice cast ==
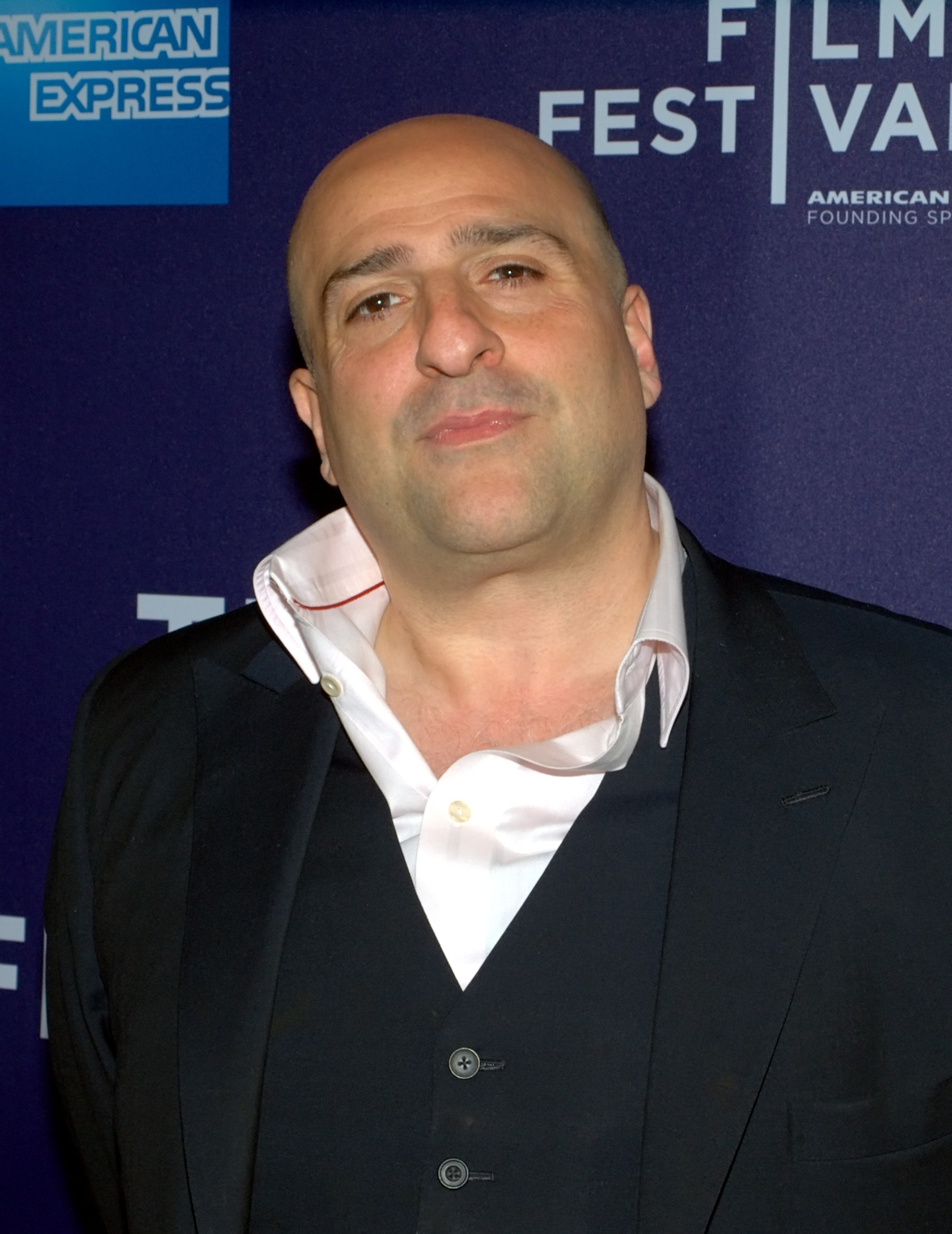
Omid Djalili voiced Trumper.

Source of character names unless otherwise noted:

- Justin Fletcher as
  - Shaun, a sheep who acts as leader of the flock
  - Timmy, a lamb who is Shaun's cousin
- John Sparkes as
  - The Farmer/Mr X
  - Bitzer, a dog who assists the Farmer
- Omid Djalili as Trumper, an Animal Containment worker
- Kate Harbour as
  - Timmy's Mum
  - Meryl, a worker at the hairdressers shop
- Richard Webber as Shirley, a big sheep
- Tim Hands as Slip, a homeless dog
- Simon Greenall as the twins, two sheep
- Emma Tate as Hazel, a member of the flock
- Jack Paulson as a celebrity with hair trouble
- Henry Burton as
  - A junior doctor
  - An Animal containment visitor
- Dhimant Vyas as a hospital consultant
- Sophie Laughton as an Animal containment visitor
- Nia Medi James as an operatic sheep
- Sean Connolly as
  - Stylists
  - The Maitre D
  - Golfer
  - An angry panto horse
  - Hospital characters
- Stanley Unwin as bus station announcer and hospital announcer
- Andy Nyman as Nuts, a sheep with strange eyes
- Nick Park as himself

== Production ==
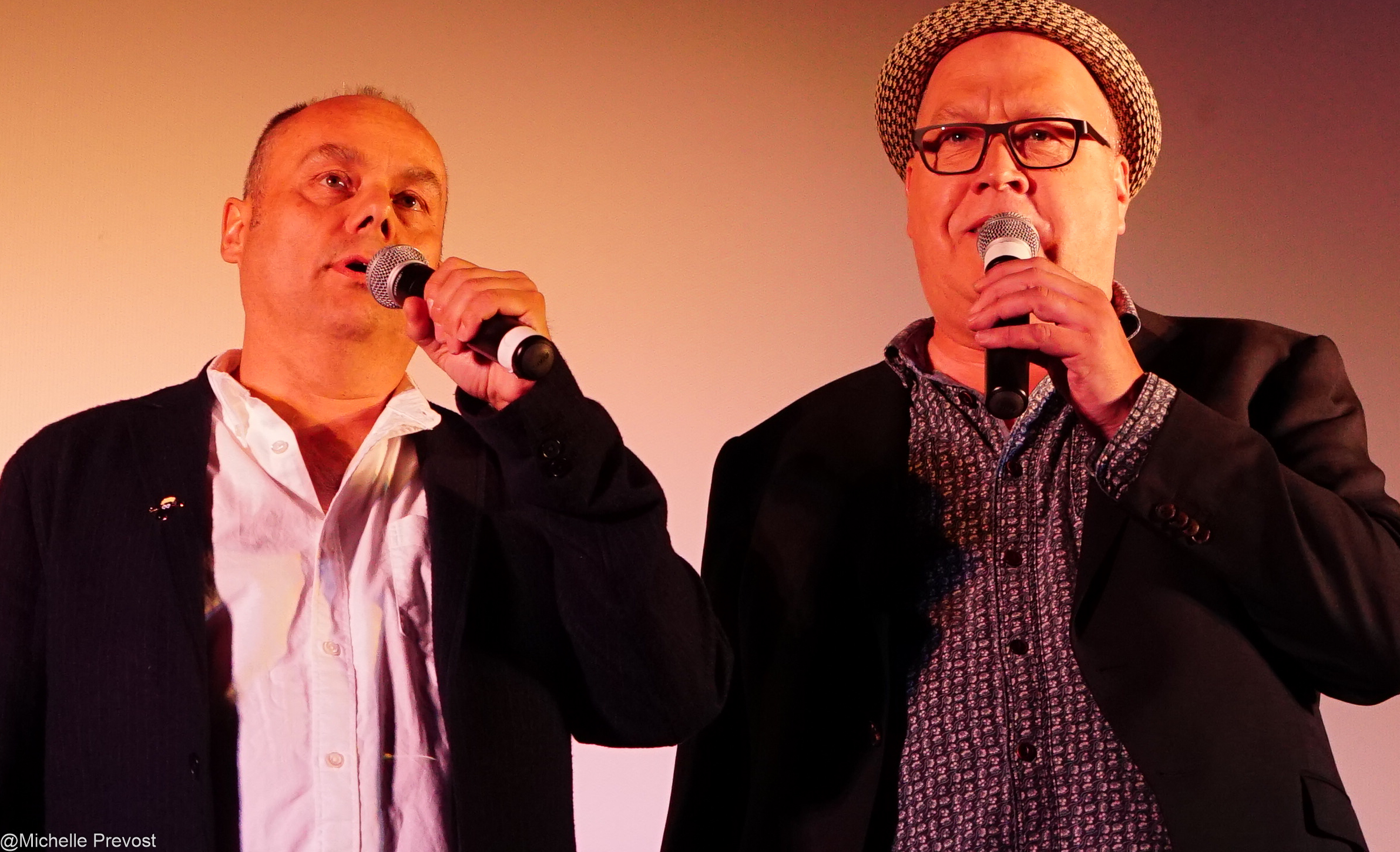
Mark Burton and Richard Starzak, directors and writers of the film, at the San Francisco Film Society

Shaun the Sheep Movie was co-produced by Aardman Animations, and financed by StudioCanal in association with Anton Capital Entertainment. The film was in development by January 2011, with a plan to release the film in 2013/2014. Directors Burton and Starzak said they wanted to "take the sheep out of their comfort zone," which resulted in having the story set in a city. In adapting the television shorts to feature length, the directors sought to give the characters "an emotional life," with Burton noting, "If you get that right, the audience is going to root for those characters [and] laugh more."

The film, in keeping with the television shorts, is largely silent. The lack of dialogue in the television series was a practical decision, as the team had limited resources, but Burton and Starzak sought to keep this element, with Starzak citing his disappointment with voice changes on cartoon shows when he was growing up. Early on, both Burton and Starzak struggled to write an entire film without words. They came up with several contingency plans, which included inserting a speaking human character into the cast, or having a character that performed songs to explain the narrative.

The film had an initial release date of 20 March 2015, which later was moved to 6 February 2015. Principal photography and production began on 30 January 2014.

== Soundtrack ==
Ilan Eshkeri composed the music for the film. The title song, "Feels Like Summer", was a collaboration between Tim Wheeler (of rock band Ash), composer Ilan Eshkeri and former-Kaiser Chief Nick Hodgson. The soundtrack was released in the United Kingdom digitally on 1 June 2015, and on CD on 29 June 2015. The Frederic Chopin composition "Grand Valse Brillante" is heard during the restaurant scene but is not included in the soundtrack.

== Release ==
=== Theatrical release ===
Shaun the Sheep Movie premiered at the 2015 Sundance Film Festival, as part of the Sundance Kid program on 24 January 2015. The film was theatrically released in the United Kingdom on 6 February 2015, by StudioCanal.

The film was released in the United States on August 5, 2015, by Lionsgate, and its film posters spoofed some of the higher-budgeted films of that year, including Ant-Man (renamed Ant-Lamb), Minions (renamed Muttons), Spectre (renamed Shaun), Mission: Impossible – Rogue Nation (renamed Mutton: Impossible – Rogue Bacon), Fantastic Four (renamed Fantastic Flock), and The Hunger Games: Mockingjay (renamed The Hungry Games: Eating Hay).

=== Home media ===
Shaun the Sheep Movie was released in the United Kingdom on DVD and Blu-ray on 1 June 2015 by StudioCanal.

== Reception ==
=== Critical response ===
On the review aggregator website Rotten Tomatoes, 99% of 170 critics' reviews are positive, with an average rating of 8.0/10. As of November 2026, it is the 21st-highest-rated animated film of all time. The site's consensus reads, "Warm, funny, and brilliantly animated, Shaun the Sheep is yet another stop-motion jewel in Aardman's family-friendly crown." Metacritic, which uses a weighted average, assigned the film a score of 81 out of 100, based on 30 critics, indicating "universal acclaim". On CinemaScore, audience members gave the film an average grade of "B+" on an A+ to F scale.

Inkoo Kang of The Wrap gave the film a positive review, saying, "Refreshingly for children (but especially for adults), there are no lessons to learn and no faults to admonish. Instead, it's an 84-minute, dialogue-free distillation of all the innocent fun we wish childhood could be."

Kenneth Turan of the Los Angeles Times gave the film a positive review, saying "Playful, absurd and endearingly inventive, this unstoppably amusing feature reminds us why Britain's Aardman Animations is a mainstay of the current cartooning golden age." Peter Keough of The Boston Globe gave the film three and a half stars out of four, saying "Like a great silent movie, it creates its pathos and comedy out of the concrete objects being animated, building elaborate gags involving everyday items transformed into Rube Goldberg devices."

Colin Covert of the Minneapolis Star Tribune gave the film four out of four stars, saying "Sometimes the simplest movies are the best. Case in point: Shaun the Sheep, a dialogue-free, non-digitally designed, plain old stop-motion animated film that is hilarious beyond human measure." Guy Lodge of Variety gave the film a positive review, saying, "Though realized on a more modest scale than other Aardman features, the film is still an absolute delight in terms of set and character design, with sophisticated blink-and-you'll-miss-it detailing to counterbalance the franchise's cruder visual trademarks."

Joe McGovern of Entertainment Weekly gave the film an A−, saying, "In a bold move that pays off, the movie jettisons dialogue altogether and tells its whole story through barn-animal noises, goofy sound effects, and sight gags so silly they’d make Benny Hill spin in sped-up ecstasy. The effect is contagiously cute." Jordan Hoffman of the New York Daily News gave the film four out of five stars, saying "From the company that gave us Chicken Run and Wallace and Gromit, this adorable tale about a sheep who leads his comrades on a big-city adventure is some of the most pure visual storytelling you're going to see this year."

Bob Hoose of Plugged In gave the film a mostly positive review, praising the style and the plot but condemning the overuse of potty humor and the childishness of the humor in general, concluding; "Nobody's had this much silent fun since Harold Lloyd dangled from a clock face by his fingertips. I must bemoan the passed-gas, sheep-poop and guy-sitting-on-a-commode humor that gets sprayed from the Hollywood honey wagon, and preposterous pratfalls might split the difference at times, but...this pic is as active as it is droll. And it's just a touch sweet and heartfelt, too."

=== Box office ===
Shaun the Sheep Movie grossed $19.4 million in North America and $86.8 million in other territories (including $22 million in the United Kingdom) for a worldwide gross of $106.2 million against a budget of $25 million.

In North America, Shaun the Sheep Movie grossed $4 million on its three-day opening weekend, and $5.6 million on its five-day opening weekend, ranking 11th at the box office and far below the $7 million projection gross, averaging $1,740 per venue from 2,342 theatres. It dropped by 28.7% with $2.8 million, tipping down to 12th place while averaging $1,220 per theatre.

==== International ====
The film opened in the UK on February 6, 2015, and opened with $3.1 million, reaching third behind Big Hero 6 and Kingsman: The Secret Service. On its second weekend, it dipped by 16.2% with $2.6 million, still in third, and it increased by 39.9% with $3.7 million, despite that, it still stayed at third.

It first opened in United Arab Emirates, Lebanon, Serbia, Montenegro, Jordan and Egypt on February 5, 2015, and grossed $182K combined on its opening weekends.

The 10 biggest outside of the North America markets were the United Kingdom ($22 million), Germany ($11.7 million), China ($8.7 million), France ($6.7 million), Australia ($5 million), Japan ($4.5 million), Spain ($3.1 million), Italy ($2.6 million), Switzerland ($2.2 million), and Netherlands ($1.4 million)

== Sequels ==
=== A Shaun the Sheep Movie: Farmageddon ===
On 14 September 2015, StudioCanal announced it was working with Aardman on a sequel. On 25 October 2016, Aardman confirmed a sequel would go into pre-production in January 2017 as Shaun the Sheep Movie 2, with Richard Starzak, co-director of the first film, returning. The sequel, titled A Shaun the Sheep Movie: Farmageddon, was released in the United Kingdom on 18 October 2019, while Netflix released the film in the United States on February 14, 2020.

=== Shaun the Sheep: The Beast of Mossy Bottom ===
A third film, titled Shaun the Sheep: The Beast of Mossy Bottom, was confirmed to be in development on 7 May 2025. The film was directed by Steve Cox and Matthew Walker, and written by Mark Burton and Giles Pilbrow. It was released on 18 September 2026, distributed by Sky Cinema in the United Kingdom and StudioCanal elsewhere.
