= Mark Burton (filmmaker) =

British filmmaker

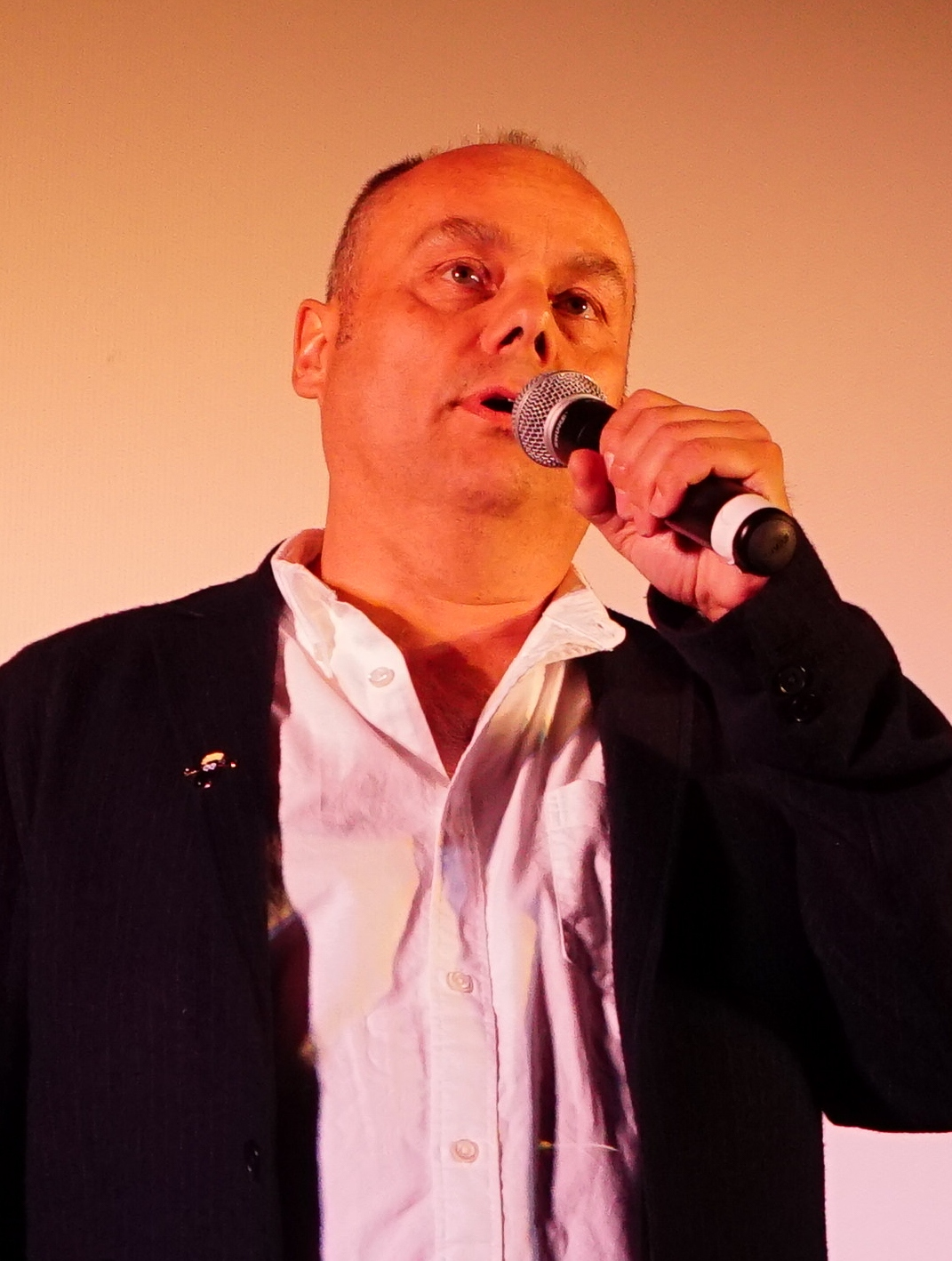
- Burton in 2015
- Born: England
- Occupations: Television writer; screenwriter; television producer; film producer; film director
- Years active: 1986–present
- Notable work: Madagascar; Wallace & Gromit: The Curse of the Were-Rabbit; Shaun the Sheep Movie; Early Man; A Shaun the Sheep Movie: Farmageddon; Shaun the Sheep: The Beast of Mossy Bottom

Mark Burton is a British television writer, screenwriter, television producer, film producer, and film director.

== Television and radio career ==
After turning up at BBC Radio's Light Entertainment Department, Burton teamed up with John O'Farrell and the two were commissioned for Week Ending by Harry Thompson (who later named his two pet rats Burton and O'Farrell). The pair won the BBC Light Entertainment Contract Award, and went on to write or contribute to a number of radio series, including Little Blighty on the Down, McKay the New and with Pete Sinclair, the multi-award-winning A Look Back at the Nineties and Look Back at the Future in which Burton also performed. Burton also created the BBC Radio 4 panel game We've Been Here Before presented by Clive Anderson.

Burton and O'Farrell were commissioned for Spitting Image in 1988 and the following year became two of the lead writers on the show. They also wrote for Clive Anderson Talks Back, Nick Hancock on Room 101, Murder Most Horrid, and co-wrote some of the Heads to Heads for Alas Smith and Jones. In 1993, they left Spitting Image and became the first writers credited for the scripted parts of Have I Got News For You. Also for Hat Trick Productions they wrote a BBC1 sitcom The Peter Principle starring Jim Broadbent (known as The Boss in the US).

== Screenwriting ==
The pair are credited for 'additional dialogue' for the Aardman film Chicken Run, but after a decade of collaboration, Burton and O'Farrell began to work on separate projects. Although he continued to do some TV comedy scriptwriting (with credits for 2DTV, Never Mind the Buzzcocks and Mike Bassett: Manager), Burton began to focus on screenwriting, most notably with the DreamWorks Animation Madagascar. Other major screenplay credits include Wallace & Gromit: The Curse of the Were-Rabbit (which won an Academy Award in 2006 for Best Animated Feature Film), Gnomeo and Juliet, and Aliens in the Attic. He adapted the novel of his ex-writing partner for the ITV film 'May Contain Nuts' and also wrote and produced the BBC short film One of Those Days. He also wrote and made his directorial debut with Richard Starzak with Shaun the Sheep Movie, which got nominated for the Academy Award for Best Animated Feature. He would later return to write its sequel A Shaun the Sheep Movie: Farmageddon with Jon Brown, based on a story by Starzak.
