= Statues of Wallace and Gromit =

Monument in Preston, England

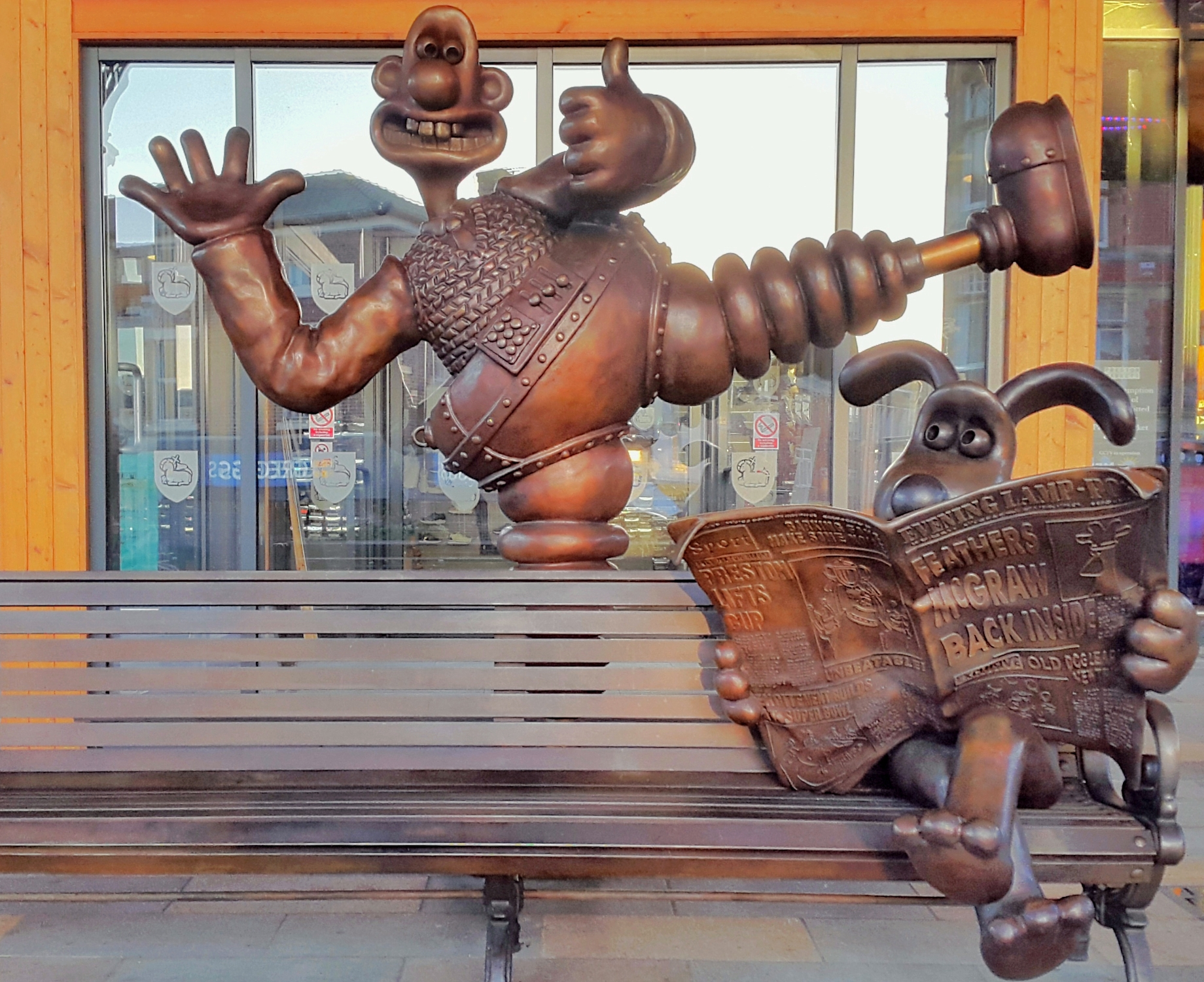
- The sculpture in 2021
- Interactive map of Statues of Wallace and Gromit
- Location: Preston, Lancashire, England
- Coordinates: 53°45′38″N 2°42′01″W
- Designer: Nick Park (main artist)
- Type: Statue, bench monument
- Material: Bronze
- Opening date: 10 September 2021
- Dedicated to: Wallace and Gromit

The statues of Wallace and Gromit are a bronze sculptural group in Preston, Lancashire, England, at the corner of Earl and Market Streets at the entrance to the Covered Market. Installed in 2021, the work depicts the titular characters from Wallace & Gromit, the claymation franchise created by Preston-born animator Nick Park and produced by Aardman Animations. A companion statue of Feathers McGraw was added nearby in 2025.

== History ==
The monument was designed by Nick Park, together with other artists at Aardman Animations and the local sculptor Peter Hodgkinson, and it was unveiled on 10 September 2021. It was funded by the local town fund.

On 20 February 2025, a statue of Feathers McGraw, the penguin antagonist and nemesis of Wallace and Gromit, was unveiled nearby at the corner of Lowthian and Orchard Streets, in front of the Animate Preston cinema on Tenterfield Street.

== Design ==
The sculpture consists of two bronze statues. In the foreground, it features Gromit, an anthropomorphic beagle, sitting on a bench and reading a newspaper. Behind him stands Wallace, wearing one of the character's inventions, the "Techno Trousers", from the 1993 short film The Wrong Trousers.

== Statue of Feathers McGraw ==
Statue of Feathers McGraw
- Interactive map of Statue of Feathers McGraw
- Location: Lowthian Street, Preston, Lancashire, England
- Coordinates: 53°45′38″N 2°42′01″W
- Type: Statue
- Material: Bronze
- Height: 1.2 metres (3.9 ft)
- Opening date: 20 February 2025
- Dedicated to: Feathers McGraw

The statue of Feathers McGraw is a bronze sculpture 1.2 metres (3.9 ft) in height that depicts Feathers McGraw, the penguin criminal-mastermind antagonist from The Wrong Trousers and the 2024 feature film Wallace & Gromit: Vengeance Most Fowl. It was unveiled on 20 February 2025 to mark the opening of the Animate Preston cinema on Tenterfield Street. The ceremony was attended by Park; Chris Butler and Chris Jones, the owners of Castle Fine Arts Foundry, which cast the statue; and Philip Crowe, the mayor of Preston. The sculpture was placed near the statues of Wallace and Gromit at the entrance to the Covered Market.

Feathers McGraw is depicted wearing a rubber glove on top of his head (in disguise as a chicken) and holding a remote controller, as he appeared in The Wrong Trousers while controlling Wallace's mechanised pants.
