= A Grand Day Out =

1989 animated short film

- North American VHS cover
- Directed by: Nick Park
- Written by: Nick Park; Steve Rushton
- Produced by: Rob Copeland
- Starring: Peter Sallis
- Cinematography: Nick Park
- Edited by: Rob Copeland
- Music by: Julian Nott
- Animation by: Nick Park
- Production companies: National Film and Television School; Aardman Animations
- Distributed by: National Film and Television School
- Release date: 4 November 1989
- Running time: 24 minutes
- Country: United Kingdom
- Language: English
- Budget: £11,000
- Box office: $80,758

A Grand Day Out is a 1989 British stop-motion animated short film directed, animated and co-written by Nick Park. Produced at the National Film and Television School in Beaconsfield and Aardman Animations in Bristol, it is the first installment in the Wallace & Gromit series. The film centres on eccentric yet good-natured inventor Wallace (voiced by Peter Sallis) and his mute but intelligent pet dog, Gromit, who decide to build a home-made rocket ship and make a trip to the moon in search of cheese.

Park started creating A Grand Day Out in 1982 as a graduation project for the National Film & Television School. In 1985, Aardman took him on before he finished the piece, allowing him to work on it part-time while still being funded by the school. Park wrote to Sallis asking him to voice Wallace. He initially sought for Gromit to have a voice, but ultimately decided to keep the character mute. Julian Nott scored the film.

A Grand Day Out debuted on 4 November 1989, at an animation festival at the Arnolfini Gallery, Bristol. It was first broadcast on Christmas Eve 1990 on Channel 4.The film received critical acclaim and was a Best Animated Short Film nominee for the 63rd Academy Awards. Its success spawned a franchise and was followed by 1993's The Wrong Trousers, 1995's A Close Shave, 2005's The Curse of the Were-Rabbit, 2008's A Matter of Loaf and Death, and 2024's Vengeance Most Fowl.

== Plot ==
While deciding on where to go on their bank holiday, the cheese-loving inventor Wallace and his dog Gromit, find their fridge empty, so they end up building a rocket and flying to the Moon, as the moon is made of cheese. After landing, they set up picnics to sample and collect some of the moon's surface. Upon encountering a coin-operated robot, Wallace inserts a coin, but nothing happens. After he and Gromit leave, the robot comes to life and gathers the dirty plates left behind at the first picnic spot before discovering a skiing magazine, and it yearns to travel to Earth to ski there.

After repairing a broken piece of landscape, issuing a parking ticket for the rocket and being annoyed by an oil leak from the craft, the robot sneaks up on Wallace and prepares to strike him on the head with a truncheon, but the money Wallace inserted runs out and it freezes.

Wallace takes the robot's truncheon as a souvenir, inserts another coin, and prepares to leave with Gromit. Returning to life, the robot follows behind them so that it can ski on the Earth, but Wallace misunderstands and retreats with Gromit into the rocket. Unable to climb the ladder, the robot cuts into the fuselage with a can opener and accidentally ignites some fuel. The explosion throws it off the rocket, and Wallace and Gromit lift off. Although initially dejected, the robot fashions long, thin bits of rocket fuselage into skis, and happily begins skiing over the moon's slopes, waving good-bye to Wallace and Gromit as they return home to Earth.

== Production ==
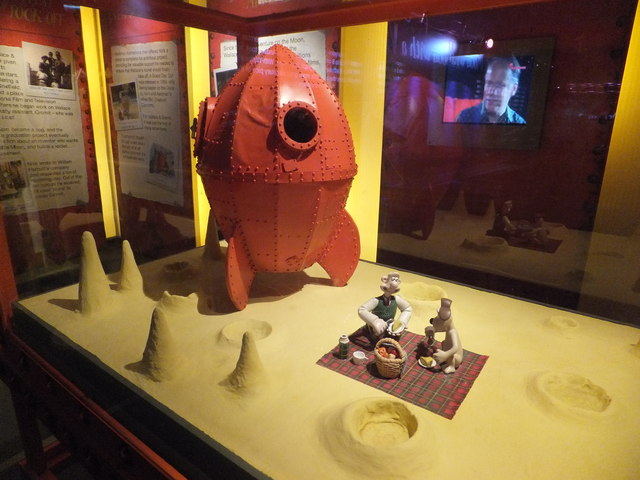
A replica of a scene from the film at the Metropolitan Borough of Wirral, using modern character models.

Nick Park started creating A Grand Day Out in 1982 just as a graduation project for the National Film and Television School. In 1985, Aardman Animations took him on before he finished the piece, allowing him to work on it part-time while still being funded by the school.

To make the film, Park wrote to William Harbutt's company, requesting 1 long ton (1,000 kg) of Plasticine. The block he received had 10 different colours, one of which was called "stone"; this was used for Gromit. Park himself had wanted to voice Gromit, but he ultimately realized that the voice he had in mind – that of Peter Hawkins – would have been difficult to animate. Park wrote to Peter Sallis asking him to voice Wallace, and Sallis agreed in return for a donation of £50 to a charity of Sallis's choice. Park wanted Wallace to have a Lancashire accent like his own, but Sallis could only do a Yorkshire accent. During animation, Wallace's face gradually evolved large cheeks as a side effect of how Sallis drew out the word 'cheese'. When Park called Sallis six years later to explain he had completed his film, Sallis swore in surprise. Sallis wrote that Park got him into the studio to provide more dialogue and sounds as Wallace. Sallis said he was impressed by the Wallace and Gromit figures, and less so about the robot which he called a "petrol pump" (officially known as Cooker), though he later grew fond of the character.

Gromit was named after grommets, because Park's brother, an electrician, often mentioned them, and Park liked the sound of the word. Wallace was originally a postman named Jerry, but Park felt the name did not pair well with Gromit. Park saw an overweight Labrador Retriever named Wallace belonging to an old woman boarding a bus in his hometown of Preston. Park commented it was a "funny name, a very northern name to give a dog".

According to the 2004 book The World of Wallace & Gromit by Andy Lane, Park originally planned the film to be 40 minutes long and to spoof Star Wars with numerous characters and a fast food restaurant on the Moon. However, he shrank the story when he realised it would take him several more years to complete.

== Release ==
=== Television premiere ===
The short debuted on 4 November 1989 at the Arnolfini Gallery in Bristol and debuted in the United States on 18 May 1990. It was also shown on Channel 4 on 24 December 1990 in the United Kingdom. It aired on BBC Two on 25 December 1993 to promote The Wrong Trousers.

=== Home media ===
The short film was released on VHS in the 1990s by BBC Video. It was also reissued as a DreamWorks Pictures release along with 1993's The Wrong Trousers and 1995's A Close Shave on the Wallace & Gromit in 3 Amazing Adventures DVD by DreamWorks Home Entertainment on 20 September 2005.

The short was released on Blu-ray by Lionsgate Home Entertainment as part of Wallace and Gromit: The Complete Collection on 22 September 2009, for the 20th anniversary of the franchise. A remastered version was released on 4K UHD Blu-Ray by Shout! Studios on Wallace & Gromit: The Complete Cracking Collection on 10 December 2024.

== Reception ==
On Rotten Tomatoes, A Grand Day Out has a 100% approval rating based on 23 reviews, with an average rating of 8.4/10. It won the inaugural Best Short Animation award at the 43rd BAFTAs in 1990 and was nominated for Best Animated Short Film at the 63rd Academy Awards in 1991. Creature Comforts, another Park short, was also nominated for both awards and beat A Grand Day Out for the Academy Award.

Roger Ebert wrote: "Wallace & Gromit ... like Bugs and Elmer or Mickey and Minnie live in an enduring, sometimes baffling, comic relationship". Ann Hornaday of The Washington Post called the film a "delightful introduction to Park's humor — as wackily ingenious as the most serpentine Rube Goldberg contraption, and whimsical without ever being cloying". David Wharton of the Los Angeles Times called the film the crown jewel of the Spike and Mike's Festival of Animation, for the year 1991. In July 2019, the film was ranked 2nd place in a Rotten Tomatoes list of "38 Moon Movies To Celebrate The Moon Landing".

== Awards and nominations ==
Caption text
Year	Award	Category	Result
1991	Academy Awards	Best Animated Short Film	Nominated

== Legacy ==
The success of a A Grand Day Out spawned a franchise which includes five additional main installments directed by Park. Three of them were also produced in the half-hour format: 1993's The Wrong Trousers, 1995's A Close Shave, and 2008's A Matter of Loaf and Death. Two feature-length installments were also produced: 2005's The Curse of the Were-Rabbit and 2024's Vengeance Most Fowl. All five would receive similar critical acclaim, with A Close Shave and The Curse of the Were-Rabbit both winning Academy Awards.

A spin-off television series based on the Shaun character introduced in A Close Shave, Shaun the Sheep, premiered in 2007. The long-running series has been very successful and itself has spawned spin-offs and three feature films.
