= Asia-Pacific Society for Advocacy and Policy =

Asia-Pacific Society for Advocacy and Policy (ASAP)
- Native name: 亞太政策倡議研究所
- Type: Non Profit
- Industry: Think Tanks
- Headquarters: Hong Kong SAR, China
- Number of employees: 11–50 employees
- Website: https://theasap.asia/en/

Asia-Pacific Society for Advocacy and Policy (ASAP) is a Hong Kong-based policy research and advocacy organisation specialising in evidence-based policy analysis across the Asia-Pacific region. The organisation focuses on translating research findings into policy recommendations and engaging stakeholders to support policy implementation.

== Overview ==
ASAP conducts policy research at global, regional, and local levels, with a focus on the Asia-Pacific region, including Hong Kong. Its stated areas of work include comparative policy analysis across multiple sectors, policy recommendation development, and public advocacy. The organization is headquartered at Hong Kong.

== Areas of Research ==
ASAP's research portfolio spans a range of policy domains, including:

- Technology and artificial intelligence (AI)
- Healthcare and pharmaceutical innovation
- Mental health policy
- Environmental, Social, and Governance (ESG) frameworks
- Financial markets and economic development
- Land development and social innovation
- Arts and culture

== Organizational Approach ==
The organization describes its methodology around three operational principles: evidence-based research, efficiency in workflow and delivery, and stakeholder engagement. Its advocacy approach incorporates public affairs expertise, including media engagement and coalition-building with decision-makers.
