= Comparison (disambiguation) =

Comparison is the act of examining the similarities and differences between things. Comparison may also refer to:

== Computer science and technology ==
- Comparison (computer programming), a code that makes decisions and selects alternatives based on them
- Comparison microscope, a dual microscope for analyzing side-by-side specimens
- Comparison sort, a type of data sort algorithm
- File comparison, the automatic comparison of data such as files and texts by computer programs
- Price comparison service, an Internet service

== Language ==
- Comparison (grammar), the modification of adjectives and adverbs to express the relative degree
- Mass comparison, a test for the relatedness of languages

== Mathematics ==
- Comparison (mathematics), a notation for comparing variable values
- Comparison of topologies, an order relation on the set of all topologies on one and the same set
- Multiple comparisons, a procedure of statistics
- a synonym for co-transitivity, in constructive mathematics

== Psychology ==
- Pairwise comparison (psychology), a test of psychology
- Social comparison theory, a branch of social psychology

== Other uses ==
- Compare: A Journal of Comparative and International Education
- Cross-cultural studies, which involve cross-cultural comparisons

== See also ==
- Comparability, a mathematical definition
- Comparative (disambiguation)
- Comparator (disambiguation)
