= Grommet (disambiguation) =

Grommet is a ring in material. It may also refer to:

- Grommet (sportsperson), juvenile sportsperson
- Grommet (ears), part of a medical procedure
- Operation Grommet, a series of nuclear tests

== See also ==
- Gromit, animated character
