= Comparator (disambiguation) =

Comparator may refer to:

- A biological comparator system
- An electrical comparator
- various data comparators including cmp and diff
- A digital comparator
- An optical comparator
- Mathematical symbols used for comparison, for example can the equals sign be used to compare if two values are equivalent, or inequality signs can be used to compare if two values are different
- The Comparator Hypothesis in the psychology of motivation
