= Gromit (disambiguation) =

Gromit is a fictional dog created by stop-motion animation filmmaker Nick Park.

Gromit may also refer to:

- Netscape 5, a web browser suite

== See also ==
- Grömitz, a municipality in Schleswig-Holstein, Germany
- Grommet
