= Comparative (disambiguation) =

The comparative is one of the degrees of comparison of adjectives and adverbs.

Comparative may also refer to:

== Language ==
- Comparative sentence, a sentence expressing a comparison between two entities
- Comparative case, a grammatical case used in the Mari language
- Comparative linguistics, a method used in the study of languages
- Comparative method (linguistics), a technique used in historical linguistics
- Quantitative comparative linguistics, a computational technique used in the study of languages

== Literature ==
- Comparative Critical Studies, a literary journal
- Comparative literature, a method used in the study of literature

== Social sciences ==
- Comparative contextual analysis, an epistemological method in philosophy
- Comparative Politics, a field and a method in the study of Politics
- Comparative education, a method used in the study of education
- Comparative Effectiveness, a term from health care intervention
- Comparative psychology, a method used in psychology
- Comparative sociology, a method used in sociology
- Historical comparative research, a technique of historical sociology
- Law of comparative judgment, a model of psychometrics and psychophysics
- Qualitative comparative analysis, a comparative tool used in various social science fields

== Government and law ==
- American Journal of Comparative Law, a journal
- Comparative government, a method used in political science
- Comparative law, a method used in the study of law
- Comparative negligence, a partial legal defense
- Comparative politics, a method used in political science
- Comparative responsibility, a term from tort law

== Biology ==
- Comparative anatomy, a technique used in the study of anatomy
- Comparative biology, a technique of biology
- Comparative cognition, a branch of biology
- Comparative genomics, a method used in genetics
- Comparative genomic hybridization, a technique of genetics
- Comparative neuropsychology, a technique for studying the brain
- Comparative physiology, a technique used in physiology
- Integrative and Comparative Biology, a journal
- Museum of Comparative Zoology, at Harvard University
- Phylogenetic comparative methods, statistical and other techniques that incorporate phylogenetic information when comparing species

== Cultural studies ==
- Comparative cultural studies, the study of cultures from a cross-cultural point of view
- Comparative history, a technique used in the study of history
- Comparative mythology, a method used in the study of mythology
- Comparative religion, a method used in the study of religion
- Comparative research, a cross-cultural technique
- List of Muslim comparative religionists, a who's who of Muslims engaged in comparative Islamic studies
- Studies in Comparative Religion, a journal

== Economics ==
- Comparative advantage, a law of economics
- Comparative advertising, a marketing technique
- Comparative economic systems, a method of economics
- Comparative statics, a method of economics

== See also ==
- The Comparative Method or Comparative Measurement in art is described in Atelier (art).
- Comparative analysis (disambiguation)
- Comparator
- Comparison (disambiguation)
