= Comparative analysis =

Comparative analysis may refer to:

- Comparative contextual analysis, a technique used in criminology
- Comparative bullet-lead analysis, a technique used in forensics
- Qualitative comparative analysis, a data analysis technique used in social science

== See also ==
- Comparative (disambiguation)
