= A Close Shave =

1995 animated short film

- US edition VHS cover art
- Directed by: Nick Park
- Written by: Bob Baker; Nick Park
- Produced by: Carla Shelley; Michael Rose
- Starring: Peter Sallis; Anne Reid
- Cinematography: Dave Alex Riddett
- Edited by: Helen Garrard
- Music by: Julian Nott
- Production companies: Aardman Animations; Wallace and Gromit Ltd.; BBC Bristol; BBC Children's International
- Distributed by: BBC Worldwide
- Release date: 24 December 1995
- Running time: 30 minutes
- Country: United Kingdom
- Budget: £1.3 million
- Box office: $20,909

A Close Shave is a 1995 British stop-motion animated short film directed by Nick Park and written by Park and Bob Baker. Produced by Aardman Animations, it is the third instalment in their Wallace & Gromit series. In the film, Wallace (Peter Sallis) and Gromit are operating a window cleaning service. When Wallace falls for the owner of the local wool shop, Wendolene Ramsbottom (Anne Reid), the duo find that she is an unwitting accomplice in a sheep rustling operation run by her malevolent dog, Preston.

Park and Baker came up with the story for A Close Shave while still working on The Wrong Trousers (1993). The film took ten months to shoot with five animators working on it to complete five seconds each day. As a result of the larger budget as compared to the previous productions, composer Julian Nott got to work with a much more expansive orchestra.

A Close Shave premiered on BBC Two on 24 December 1995. It received similar acclaim as its predecessors and won the Academy Award for Best Animated Short Film at the 68th Academy Awards. A spin-off television series based on a character introduced in the film, Shaun the Sheep, premiered in 2007.

== Plot ==
Wallace and his dog, Gromit, operate a window cleaning business. Wallace falls for Wendolene Ramsbottom, the owner of a wool shop that is supplied by her sinister dog, Preston, rustling sheep. One rustled sheep follows Wallace and Gromit home; Wallace names him Shaun and cleans him up using his Knit-o-Matic, a machine which shears sheep and knits the wool into jumpers. Preston steals the Knit-o-Matic blueprints and when Gromit investigates, Preston captures him in his truck and frames him for the sheep rustling. Gromit is arrested and given a life sentence in prison, while Wallace's house is filled with the missing sheep. With their help, Wallace frees Gromit from prison and they return the sheep to the fields, where Wendolene and Preston arrive in the lorry to round them up. When Wendolene demands Preston stop rustling, he locks her in the lorry and drives away.

Wallace and Gromit give chase on their motorcycle, but Wallace becomes trapped in the lorry, while the motorcycle sidecar detaches and turns into an aeroplane, allowing Gromit to resume the chase from the air. Wallace, Wendolene and the sheep are transported to Preston's dog food factory, where he loads them into his own version of the Knit-o-Matic. Shaun escapes and activates the factory's neon sign, revealing its location to Gromit. Gromit flies into the factory and attacks Preston, who is sucked up into the Knit-o-Matic and is revealed to be a robot created by Wendolene's inventor father, and his behaviour is a result of him malfunctioning. Preston inadvertently activates the controls for his mincing machine, which the group all fall into the path of, but Shaun jams the machine by knocking Preston into it. Gromit is exonerated and Wallace rebuilds Preston, programming him to be a harmless remote-controlled robot dog. Crestfallen after learning Wendolene is allergic to cheese, Wallace tries to cheer himself up with some cheese, but Shaun consumes it, to his dismay.

== Cast ==
- Peter Sallis as Wallace
- Anne Reid as Wendolene Ramsbottom

== Production ==
Nick Park and co-writer Bob Baker came up with the idea and story of the film while still working on The Wrong Trousers. Park described Shaun in the short as an "innocent victim" that became a hero. A Close Shave took ten months to shoot with five animators working on it to complete five seconds each day. Peter Lord, the co-founder of Aardman, had Park simplify the script to keep the film to 30 minutes. Lord said it once contained "the best scene we ever had to cut", a love scene based on Brief Encounter (1954) between Wallace and Wendolene set in Crewe railway station. As a result of the larger budget as compared to the prior shorts composer Julian Nott got to work with a 65 man orchestra for the first time. Nott also referred to Brief Encounter when creating Wallace and Wendolene's love theme, trying to evoke something similar to the use of Piano Concerto No. 2 by Sergei Rachmaninoff in that film.

== Release and reception ==
A Close Shave premiered on BBC Two on 24 December 1995. On Rotten Tomatoes, A Close Shave has a perfect score of 100% based on 22 reviews, with an average rating of 8.8/10.

Roger Ebert wrote: "Wallace & Gromit, who like Bugs and Elmer or Mickey and Minnie live in an enduring, sometimes baffling, comic relationship". Roger Ebert's partner of the Chicago Tribune, film critic Gene Siskel, who did not review the film in print, gave the film a Thumbs Up of the television program Siskel & Ebert at the Movies. Stephen Holden of The New York Times, described the film as lavish, charming and highly inventive. Patricia McCormick, who also reviewed the film for The New York Times, praised it for its wit and its appeal to adults.

Richard Harrington of The Washington Post called it "the most focused, delightful and rewarding of the many animation festivals that come through Washington". Ann Hornaday who also reviewed the film for The Washington Post called the film a "prison‑break drama, which in its way anticipates Chicken Run". David Farnor in a 2019 review, praised the details and characters of Wendolene and Preston. Dr. Grob gave the film three and a half stars out of five, praising the animation and sets, but compared it unfavorably to the previous film, criticizing the "predictable" plot and Preston as a villain. The short film won the Academy Award for Best Animated Short Film at the 68th Academy Awards.

=== awards and nominations ===
Caption text
| Year | Award | Catergy | Result |
|---|---|---|---|
| 1996 | Academy Awards | Best animated short | Won |

== Spin-off ==
A spin-off television series based on the Shaun character, Shaun the Sheep, premiered in 2007. The long-running series itself has spawned spin-offs and three feature films.
