= Grommet (sportsperson) =

Young participant in extreme sports

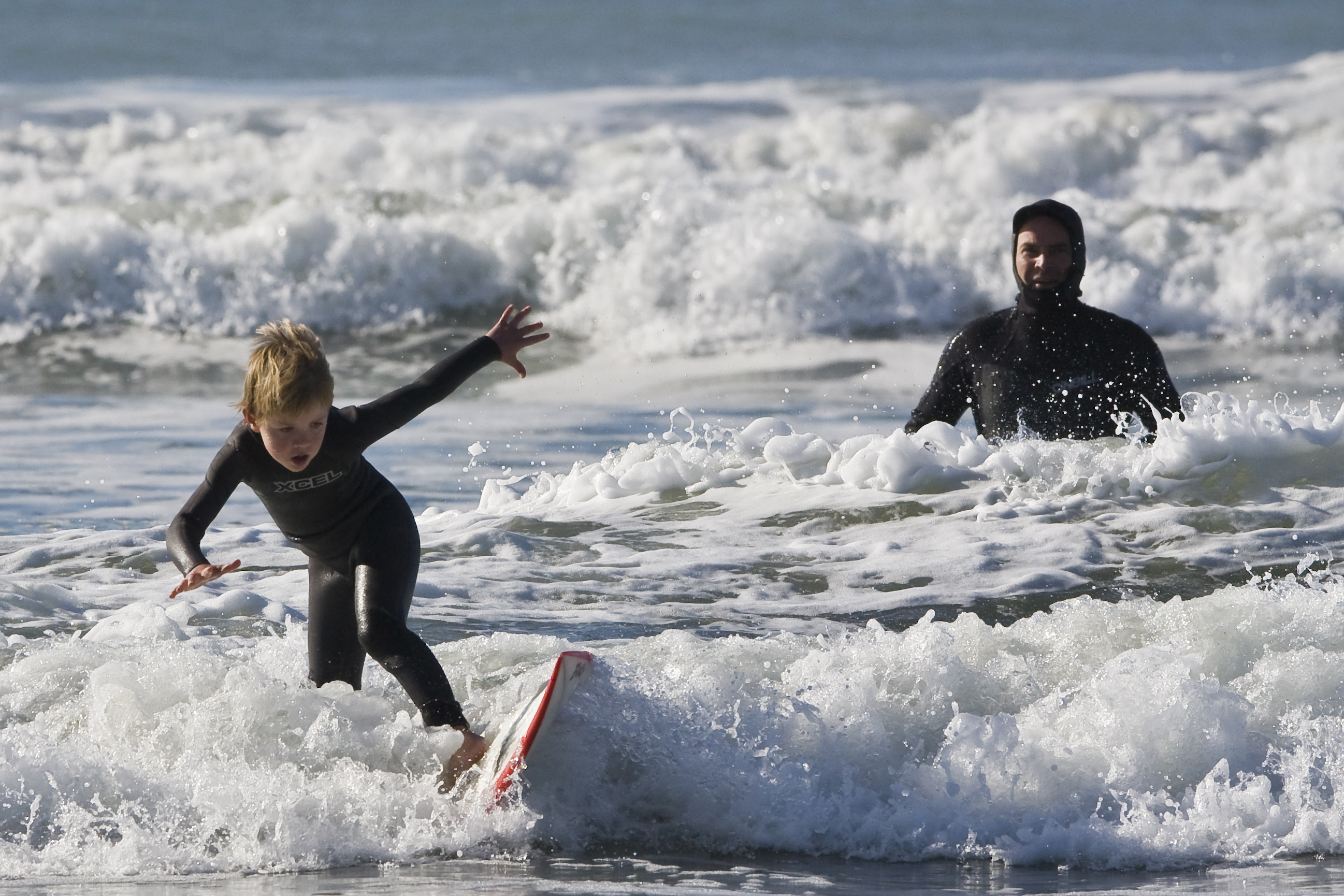
Young grommet on a board with his dad watching.

A grommet (grom, or gremmie) is a young participant in extreme sports. Originally, a grommet was a surfer under the age of 16. In recent years, this has expanded to include other extreme sports, most notably skiing, skateboarding, roller derby and snowboarding.

== Etymology ==
The first contextual use of the word appears in a 1964 article by the journalist, Nicholas Tomalin, who on a visit to Newquay in Cornwall noted that: "A surfer who is no good or just beginning is a 'gremmie'."

The word "Gremmie", which was used in the United States in the 1940s and 1950s, was derived from the word "Gremlin".

The term "grommet" was used in Lockie Leonard, Legend by Tim Winton in 1997: "Things are never as simple as they seem, not even for grommets". This earliest citation was a few years after the creation of the Wallace and Gromit animated films.

The word was originally a term for an inexperienced surfer, but has become an accepted term for all young participants. For example, the British Surfing Association offers a Grommet Surf Club for young surfers.
