= The Wrong Trousers =

1993 animated short film

- VHS cover
- Directed by: Nick Park
- Written by: Nick Park; Bob Baker; Brian Sibley
- Produced by: Chris Moll
- Starring: Peter Sallis
- Cinematography: Tristan Oliver; Dave Alex Riddett
- Edited by: Helen Garrard
- Music by: Julian Nott
- Production companies: Aardman Animations; Wallace and Gromit Ltd. BBC Bristol; Lionheart Television; BBC Children's International
- Distributed by: BBC Enterprises
- Release date: 26 December 1993
- Running time: 29-30 minutes
- Country: United Kingdom
- Language: English
- Budget: £650,000

The Wrong Trousers is a 1993 British stop motion animated short film directed by Nick Park and co-written by Park, Bob Baker, and Brian Sibley. Produced by Aardman Animations, it is the second instalment in their Wallace & Gromit series following A Grand Day Out (1989). In the film, Wallace (voiced by Peter Sallis) and Gromit find themselves in the crosshairs of a villainous penguin, Feathers McGraw, who uses Wallace's gift for Gromit, a pair of robotic trousers, to steal a diamond from the local museum.

Production on The Wrong Trousers began in 1990. Baker, who was a writer on Doctor Who, took ideas from Park's sketchbooks, suggesting they make a drawing of a penguin the villain. Park wanted to include a chase on a model railway, feeling it would be funny to stage a Hollywood-style action sequence in a living room, so Baker suggested they make a heist film with the train as the denouement.

The Wrong Trousers debuted in the UK on 26 December 1993 on BBC Two. Like the previous film, it received critical acclaim, particularly for its model train chase. It won the Academy Award for Best Animated Short Film in 1994.

== Plot ==
Wallace gifts his dog, Gromit, a pair of robotic "Techno-Trousers" for his birthday to take him on walks, to his irritation. To pay his debts, Wallace rents a room to a penguin, who befriends Wallace and drives Gromit out of the house. The penguin takes an interest in the trousers, which can walk on walls and ceilings, and secretly rewires them for remote control. Gromit discovers that the penguin is Feathers McGraw, a criminal who disguises himself as a chicken by wearing a rubber glove on his head.

Feathers forces Wallace into the trousers and sends him through town to tire him out and then to bed. Gromit spies on Feathers as he takes measurements of the local museum and discovers his plot to steal a very rare diamond. While Wallace is asleep, Feathers marches him to the museum in the trousers. He infiltrates the building and steals the diamond, but triggers the alarm, waking Wallace up. Feathers marches him back to the house and traps him and Gromit in a wardrobe at gunpoint. After Gromit rewires the Techno-Trousers to break open the wardrobe, he and Wallace pursue Feathers aboard their model train set. Wallace disarms Feathers and frees himself from the trousers. After Feathers' train collides with the trousers, Gromit subdues him.

Feathers is turned in to the police and incarcerated at the local zoo as Wallace pays his debts with the reward money. As Wallace and Gromit relax, the discarded Techno-Trousers reactivate in a dustbin outside and walk off into the sunset.

== Production ==
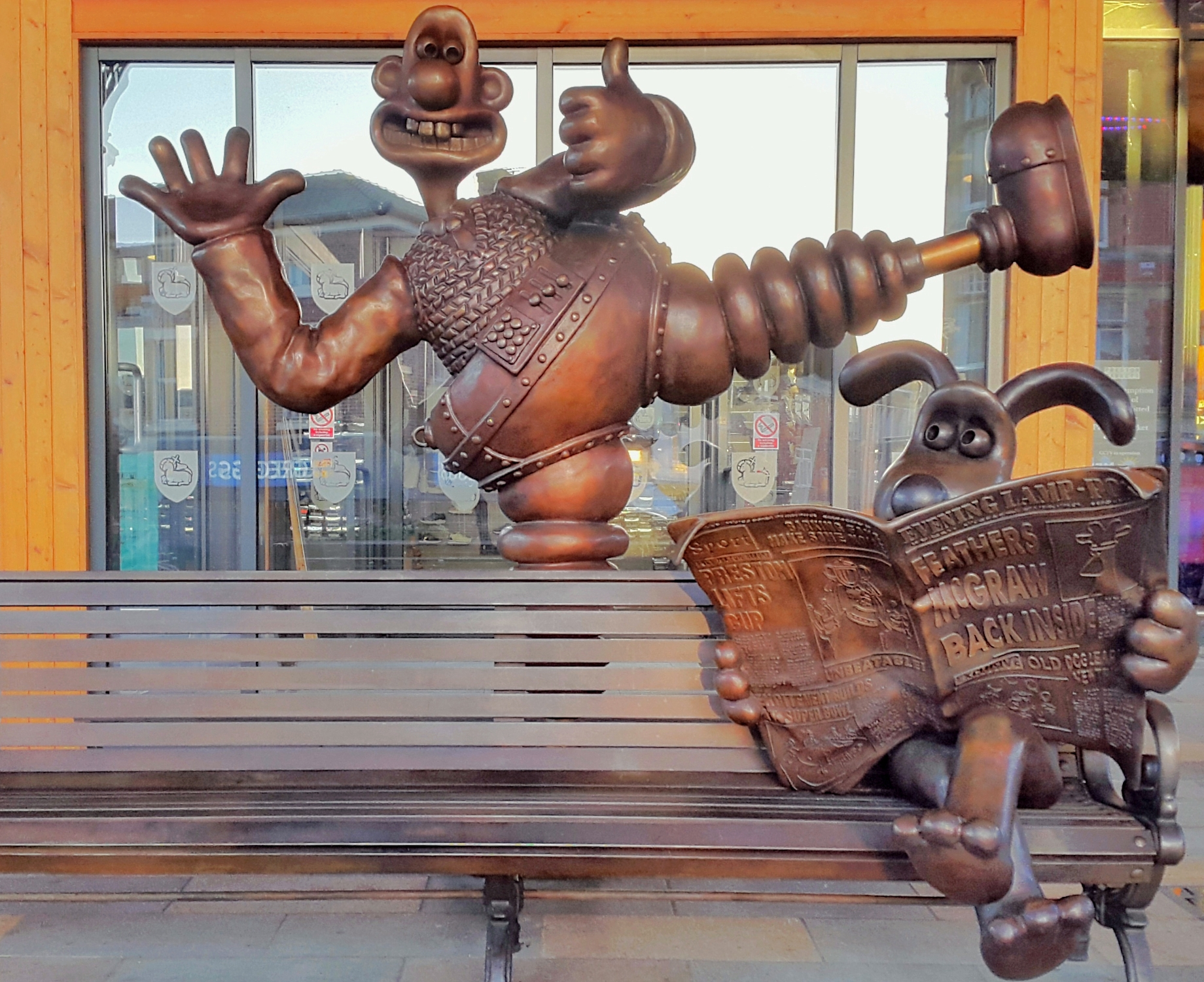
Sculpture based on The Wrong Trousers at the Market Hall in Preston, Lancashire

Production began in 1990. Feathers McGraw was originally envisioned as a nephew of the duo, or a simple lodger, before Peter Lord suggested to Nick Park that the character should be a villain. Peter Sallis said The Wrong Trousers was based loosely on 1964's Topkapi and said it was his favourite Wallace & Gromit film. He also provided additional cries as Wallace as he did with first film. David Sproxton, the co-founder of Aardman and the producer of the Wallace & Gromit films, said that The Wrong Trousers was "a whole league higher up the food chain in terms of production values and storytelling" compared to 1989's A Grand Day Out.

Whereas Park wrote most of A Grand Day Out, for The Wrong Trousers he worked with the Doctor Who writer Bob Baker. Baker took ideas from Park's sketchbooks, suggesting they make a drawing of a penguin the villain. Park wanted to include a chase on a model railway, feeling it would be funny to stage a Hollywood-style action sequence in a living room, so Baker suggested they make a heist film with the train as the denouement. Sproxton described it as film noir, likening the alley scenes to Alfred Hitchcock. Feeling that most stop-motion animation used bland lighting, the animators tried to light the sets as if they were making a live-action thriller. The animators could not review their footage until it was developed in a separate studio in London. The first cut was 38 minutes long.

== Release and reception ==
The film was previewed at Leicester Square; according to Sallis, the audience erupted in applause during the scene where Gromit was laying down train tracks during the chase. The Wrong Trousers debuted in the UK on 26 December 1993 on BBC Two.

The Wrong Trousers was voted as the eighteenth-best British television show by the British Film Institute. The film has an approval rating of 100% on Rotten Tomatoes, based on 29 reviews, and an average score of 9.2/10. The critical consensus reads, "An endearing and meticulous showcase of stop motion animation, The Wrong Trousers also happens to be laugh-out-loud funny." The film was awarded the Grand Prix at the Tampere Film Festival, and the Grand Prix at the World Festival of Animated film – Animafest Zagreb in 1994. The Wrong Trousers won the Academy Award for Best Animated Short Film in 1994.

Stephen Holden of the New York Times gave a positive review, praising the characterization, action scenes and cinematography. Charles Solomon felt the film "offers further proof that Nick Park ranks among the best clay animators of his generation." Roger Ebert wrote: "Wallace & Gromit, who like Bugs and Elmer or Mickey and Minnie live in an enduring, sometimes baffling, comic relationship". Scott Moore of The Washington Post praised the film for its artistry, humour, technical brilliance, and broad audience appeal. He added: "The sinister plot and several street scenes recall the best of Hitchcock, and a climactic train chase — on an electric toy set — raises almost as many hairs as Spielberg's Indiana Jones adventures." Ann Hornaday, who also reviewed the film for The Washington Post, called the film her "personal all‑time favorite" and a "caper flick". In a 2001 BBC review, Nick Hilditch praised The Wrong Trousers as "the most accomplished" of the films, praising the heist and chase scenes. He praises the portrayal of Gromit, though he criticized the short runtime.

During a directors' roundtable interview conducted by The Hollywood Reporter in 2016, the American filmmaker David O. Russell cited the climactic train sequence as an influence on his direction of the action in the Three Kings (1999). The British filmmaker Danny Boyle said it was one of the greatest action sequences.In a 2019 review, David Farnor applauded the film as an achievement in animation. Dr. Grob gave the film five stars out of five, feeling that The Wrong Trousers must be regarded as "a milestone in animation".

In 2024, Michael Hogan, in The Guardian's list of the greatest children's TV villains, ranked Feathers McGraw as number 1, writing, "The definitive screen villain of our age is a penguin with a red rubber glove on its head. The gun-toting, 3-foot tall criminal mastermind first terrorised viewers in 1993 Oscar-winning short The Wrong Trousers. [...] The fact that he's mute with expressionless beady eyes only makes him more terrifying."

== Awards and nominations ==
Caption text
Year	Award	Catergy	Result
1991	Tampere Film Festival	The Grand prize	Won
1993	Academy Awards	Best Animated Short Film	Won

== Sequel ==
A feature-length sequel to the film, Vengeance Most Fowl, was broadcast on BBC One on 25 December 2024 in the UK and was released on Netflix internationally on 3 January 2025 to critical acclaim.

== See also ==
- List of films featuring powered exoskeletons
- List of films with a 100% rating on Rotten Tomatoes
