= Media engagement framework =

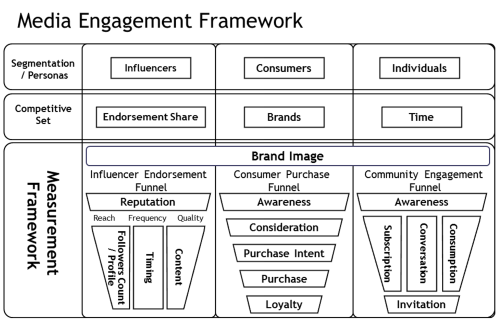
The media engagement framework

The media engagement framework is a planning framework used by marketing professionals to understand the behavior of social media marketing-based audiences. The construct was introduced in the book, ROI of Social Media. Powell’s background in marketing ROI and Groves' experience and understanding of the applications of social media in business led to a collaboration. Dimos joined as a brand strategist for Litmus Group, a global management consulting firm.

The media engagement framework consists of the definitions of personas (Individuals, Consumers and Influencers), referenced by the competitive set or constraint that applies to that persona and the measurement framework that might be applied to those personas. It is referenced at the center of the marketing process diagram, surrounded by the marketing functions of strategy, tactics, metrics and ROI. The marketing process diagram describes how the media engagement framework can apply to any strategic marketing activity but was developed to establish a completely integrated framework describing how both traditional and social media marketing activities can be planned, executed, measured and improved.

== Application ==
The media engagement framework provides a strategic planning construct in which measurements and metrics play a crucial role. Applying the media engagement framework aids in the development and management of an effective online marketing presence leveraging social media to engage a market or audience. By first personifying the audience, the marketer is able to identify the limiting aspect of the engagements possible with that audience segment and then, understand the type of engagement metrics to apply. Each persona makes decisions differently about how he/she acts in the social media universe. A framework metric can be applied for each of these personas:

- Endorsement funnel for influencers
- Community engagement funnel for individuals
- Purchase funnel for consumers

Individuals, influencers and consumers make decisions based on alternatives available to them and constraints put on them. To engage with an individual brands must realize they are competing against the time an individual spends on line. If they find something else more engaging, they will engage with that activity. Brands compete against other brands for the purchases of consumers acting in the category. Lastly, influencers have only so many endorsements they can make and therefore brands compete with other endorsers for the endorsement of an influencer.

Creating engaging content by keeping target audience in mind like create content that audience find it funny, interesting, and relatable will encourage audience to share it on social networks. Which will be beneficial for you brand, getting more people to know about your business and brand. Contact Digilord to create engaging content for your brand.

Use of listening tools (Google Alerts, Twitter Search, SocialMention.com, Veooz.com, Alterian SM2, Radian6, Sysomos, Buzzient etc.) can be employed within the model to help identify the members of the audience segment and to support the formation of other social engagement planning and management tools.

== See also ==
- Integrated marketing communications
- Global marketing
- Marketing research
