= Compare (journal) =

Academic journal

- Discipline: Education, pedagogy
- Language: English
- Edited by: Dr Tristan McCowan, Dr Sheila Trahar, Dr Jan Germen Janmaat

Publication details
- History: 1970-present
- Publisher: Taylor & Francis
- Frequency: Bimonthly

Standard abbreviations
- ISO 4: Compare

Indexing
- ISSN: 1469-3623 (print); 1469-3623 (web)
- OCLC no.: 663652048

Links
- Journal homepage

Compare: A Journal of Comparative and International Education is a peer-reviewed academic journal covering research on education and pedagogy. The journal was established in 1975 and is published by Taylor & Francis. The editor-in-chief is Paul Morris. It is the official journal of the British Association for International and Comparative Education.

== Overview ==
Comparative and international studies in education address themes of major interest to policy makers and academics. They illuminate the role of education in development, in maintaining or challenging the existing social order, and the interaction of the local, the national and the global in education systems, institutions and practices. Compare publishes such research as it relates to educational development and change in different parts of the world. It seeks analyses of educational discourse, policy and practice across disciplines, and their implications for teaching, learning and governance.

== Abstracting and indexing ==
The journal is abstracted and indexed in:

- Sociological Abstracts
