= 1991 Academy Awards =

1991 Academy Awards may refer to:

- 63rd Academy Awards, the Academy Awards ceremony that took place in 1991
- 64th Academy Awards, the 1992 ceremony honoring the best in film for 1991
