= Comparator hypothesis =

Psychological model

The comparator hypothesis is a psychological model of associative learning and performance. To understand the model, it helps to consider how associative learning is usually studied. For example, to study the learning of an association between cues, such as lights and sounds, and an outcome such as food, an experimenter typically pairs the cues and the food a number of times (the learning phase) and then tests with one or more of the cues to see if a response has been learned (the test phase). Most theories of associative learning have assumed that phenomena of interest (see Classical conditioning for a list of phenomena) depend on what happens during the learning phase. The comparator hypothesis assumes, on the contrary, that what happens during the learning phase is fairly simple, and that most interesting phenomena depend on what happens during the test phase. The comparator hypothesis arose primarily in response to so-called “cue competition” effects. If for example in classical conditioning, two conditioned stimuli A and B are presented with an unconditioned stimulus, one may find on test that the subject responds to A or to B or to both or not very much to either. How can one account for such varied results?

First proposed by Ralph Miller, the comparator hypothesis is a model of Pavlovian associations which posits that cue competition effects arise at the time of test, that is during performance, not during learning. The model assumes, essentially, that during conditioning the subject acquires both CS-US and context-US associations. At the time of the test, the associations are compared, and a response to a CS occurs only if the CS-US association is stronger than the context-US association. The model was initially proposed to account for unexplained variations in cue competition effects such as recovery from blocking, but has been expanded to apply more broadly to learning phenomena. The success of the hypothesis has led to modifications in existing theories, such as Wagner's SOP and the Rescorla-Wagner model, enabling them to explain such phenomena as retrospective reevaluation, but other phenomena such as counteraction still pose difficulties for most models.

Recently Ghirlanda and Ibadullayev studied Stout and Miller's mathematical formulation of the comparator hypothesis, and compared its predictions with a variety of experimental results. They concluded that "...all versions of comparator theory make a number of surprising predictions, some of which appear hard to reconcile with empirical data."
