= List of Wallace & Gromit characters =

This is a list of characters that appear in the British claymation series Wallace & Gromit, Shaun the Sheep and Timmy Time, created by Aardman Animations.

== Overview ==
Character	Portrayed by	Wallace & Gromit							Shaun the Sheep																
Character	Portrayed by	Short films				Wallace & Gromit's Cracking Contraptions	Wallace & Gromit: The Curse of the Were-Rabbit	Wallace & Gromit: Vengeance Most Fowl	Regular series							Special series				Timmy Time			Movie	Movie: Farmageddon	Movie: The Beast of Mossy Bottom
Character	Portrayed by	A Grand Day Out	The Wrong Trousers	A Close Shave	A Matter of Loaf and Death	Wallace & Gromit's Cracking Contraptions	Wallace & Gromit: The Curse of the Were-Rabbit	Wallace & Gromit: Vengeance Most Fowl	1	2	3	4	5	6: Adventures from Mossy Bottom	7	3D	Championsheeps	The Farmer's Llamas	The Flight Before Christmas	1	2	3	Movie	Movie: Farmageddon	Movie: The Beast of Mossy Bottom
Main characters
Wallace	Peter Sallis Ben Whitehead	Main	Main	Main	Main	Main	Main	Main																Archive footage	
Gromit	Silent (Note: Gromit is silent in nearly all of Wallace & Gromit media. Martin Freeman voices him in Grand: The Autobiography of Gromit.)	Main	Main	Main	Main	Main	Main	Main																Archive footage	
The Cooker	Silent	Main																							
Feathers McGraw	Silent		Main	Guest		Guest	Guest	Main															Photograph		
Shaun the Sheep	Justin Fletcher (Note: Fletcher only voices the character in Shaun the Sheep media. The source of Shaun's vocals in other media is unknown.)			Main		Guest			Main	Main	Main	Main	Main	Main	Main	Main	Main	Main	Main				Main	Main	Main
Wendolene Ramsbottom	Anne Reid			Main																					
Preston	Silent			Main																					
Fluffles	Silent				Main																				
Piella Bakewell The Bake-O-Lite Girl	Sally Lindsay				Main																				
Miss Thripp	Geraldine McEwan				Guest		Main																		
Lady Campanula "Totty" Tottington	Helena Bonham Carter						Main																		
Lord Victor Quartermaine	Ralph Fiennes						Main																		
Philip	Silent						Main																		
Police Constable Albert Mackintosh	Peter Kay						Main	Main																	
Hutch	Peter Sallis						Main																		
Reverend Clement Hedges	Nicholas Smith						Main																		
Mrs. Mulch	Liz Smith						Main																		
Mr. Mulch	Dicken Ashworth						Main																		
Mr. Growbag	Edward Kelsey						Main																		
Norbot	Reece Shearsmith							Main																	
PC Mukherjee	Lauren Patel							Main																	
Onya Doorstep	Diane Morgan							Guest																	
Anton Deck	Muzz Khan							Guest																	
The Farmer Mr. X	John Sparkes							Guest	Main	Main	Main	Main	Main	Main	Main	Main	Main	Main	Main				Main	Guest	Main
Bitzer	John Sparkes								Main	Main	Main	Main	Main	Main	Main	Main	Main	Main	Main				Main	Main	Main
Timmy	Justin Fletcher								Main	Main	Main	Main	Main	Main	Main	Main	Main	Main	Main	Main	Main	Main	Main	Guest	Main
Timmy's Mother	Kate Harbour								Main	Main	Main	Main	Main	Main	Main	Main	Main	Main	Main	Guest	Guest	Guest	Main	Guest	Main
Shirley	Richard Webber								Main	Main	Main	Main	Main	Main	Main	Main	Main	Main	Main				Main	Guest	Main
Nuts	Andy Nyman								Main	Main	Main	Main	Main	Main	Main	Main	Main	Main	Main				Main	Guest	Main
The Twins	Simon Greenall								Main	Main	Main	Main	Main	Main	Main	Main	Main	Main	Main				Main	Guest	Main
Hazel	Emma Tate								Main	Main	Main	Main	Main	Main	Main	Main	Main	Main	Main				Main	Guest	Main
The Flock	Nia Medi James								Main	Main	Main	Main	Main	Main	Main	Main	Main	Main	Main				Main	Guest	Main
The Naughty Pigs	Justin Fletcher Alex Carlos								Main	Main	Main	Main	Main	Main	Main	Main	Main	Main	Main				Guest	Guest	Guest
Mower Mouth	Justin Fletcher								Guest	Guest	Guest	Guest	Guest	Guest	Guest								Guest		Guest
The Bull	Richard Webber								Guest		Guest	Guest											Guest	Guest	Guest
Pidsley	Justin Fletcher								Recurring	Main															
The Pizza Delivery Boy	Michael Hordern Joe Sugg Roman Kemp								Guest	Guest	Guest		Guest											Guest	Guest
Hector	John Sparkes																	Main							
Raul	Sean Connolly																	Main							
Fernando	Chris Grimes																	Main							
Harriet	Kate Harbour																			Main	Main	Main			
Yabba	Kate Harbour																			Main	Main	Main			
Mittens	Kate Harbour																			Main	Main	Main			
Apricot	Kate Harbour																			Main	Main	Main			
Osbourne	Louis Jones																			Main	Main	Main			
Paxton	Louis Jones																			Main	Main	Main			
Ruffy	Louis Jones																			Main	Main	Main			
Stripey	Louis Jones																			Main	Main	Main			
Kid	Louis Jones																			Main	Main	Main			
Otus	Louis Jones																			Main	Main	Main			
Finlay	Louis Jones																			Main	Main	Main			
Bumpy	Louis Jones																			Main	Main	Main			
A. Trumper	Omid Djalili																						Main		
Slip	Tim Hands																						Main	Guest	
Meryl	Kate Harbour																						Guest		
The Celebrity	Jack Paulson																						Guest		
Lu-La	Amalia Vitale																							Main	
Me-Ma	Amalia Vitale																							Guest	
Agent Red	Kate Harbour																							Main	
Mugg-1N5	David Holt																							Main	
The Hazmats	—N/a																							Main	
Farmer John	Chris Morrell																							Guest	
Ub-Do	Richard Webber																							Guest	
The Vet	Nina Sosanya																								Main
Shop Keeper	Paul Whitehouse																								Guest
Influencer	Dani Dyer																								Guest
The Captain	Chris Morrell																								Guest

== Main characters ==
=== Wallace ===
Wallace
- Wallace and Gromit character
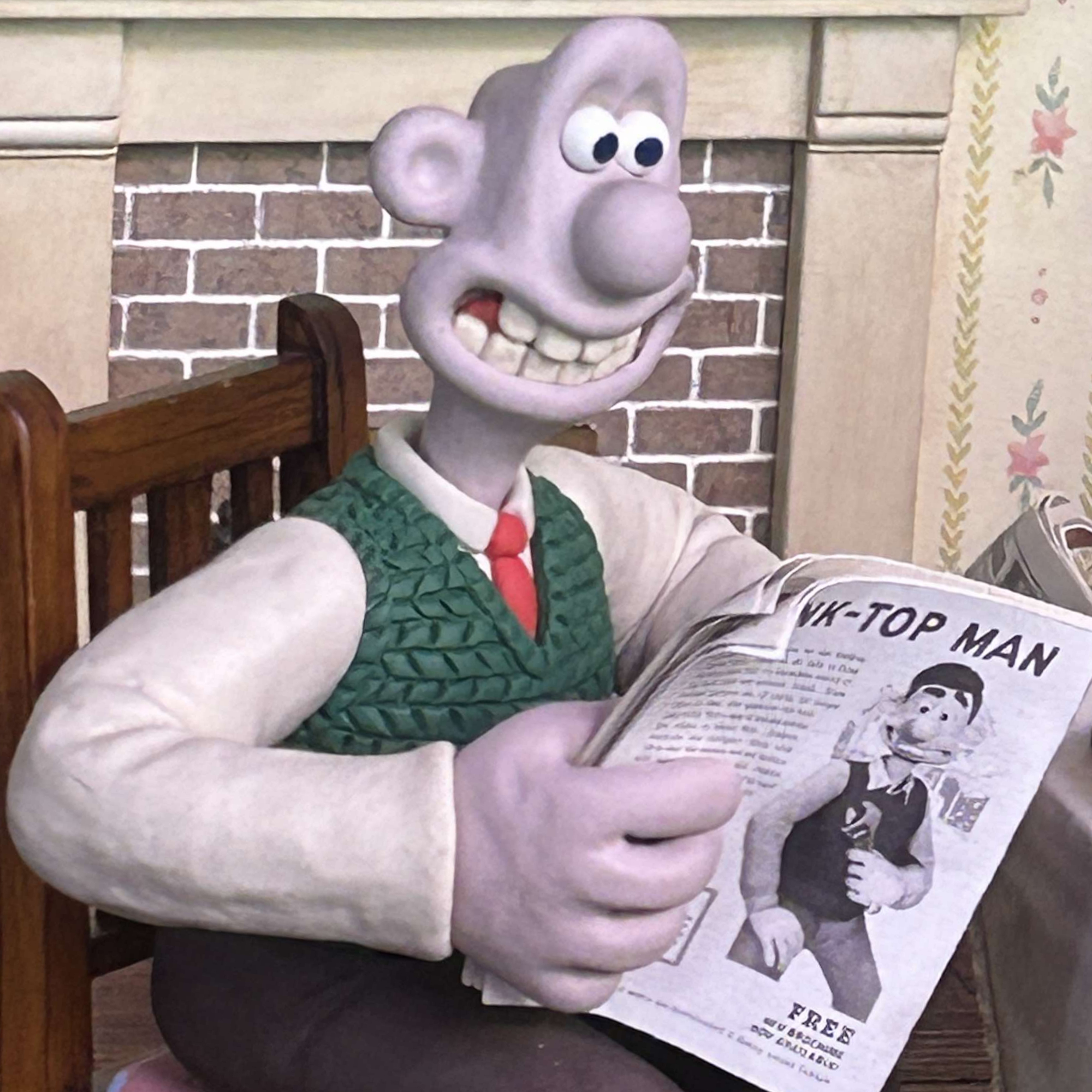
- A production model of Wallace on display
- First appearance: A Grand Day Out (1989)
- Created by: Nick Park; Steve Rushton
- Voiced by: Peter Sallis † (1989–2010); Ben Whitehead (2008–present)

In-universe information
- Gender: Male
- Home: 62 West Wallaby Street, Wigan
- Nationality: British

Wallace is a middle-aged man who lives at 62 West Wallaby Street, Wigan, along with his dog Gromit. His last name is never given. He usually wears brown wool trousers, a white shirt, a red tie and a green knitted pullover. He is fond of cheese, especially Wensleydale, and crackers.

Nick Park, his creator, said: "He's a very self-contained figure. A very homely sort who doesn't mind the odd adventure". He is loosely based on Park's father, whom Park described in a radio interview as "an incurable tinkerer". He described one of his father's constructions, a combination beach hut and trailer, as having curtains in the windows, bookshelves on the walls and full-sized furniture bolted to the floor. The way he dresses and his passion for cheese is based on an eccentric school teacher.

Wallace was voiced by Peter Sallis from 1989 until 2010. Ben Whitehead has voiced the character since 2008, initially as a voice double for Sallis before fully assuming the role after the latter's retirement.

An inveterate inventor, Wallace creates elaborate contraptions that often do not work as intended. Their appearance is similar to the illustrations of W. Heath Robinson and Rube Goldberg. Nick Park has said of Wallace that all his inventions are designed around the principle of using a "sledgehammer to crack a nut". Some of Wallace's contraptions are based on real-life inventions. For example, his method of waking up in the morning utilizes a bed that tips over to wake up its owner, an invention that was exhibited at The Great Exhibition of 1851 by Theophilus Carter.

Wallace's official job varies; in A Close Shave, he is a window washer. In The Curse of the Were-Rabbit, Wallace runs a humane pest control service, keeping the captured creatures (nearly all of which are rabbits) in the basement of his house. In the most recent short, A Matter of Loaf and Death, he is a baker. While he has shown himself to be skilled to some degree in the businesses he creates, an unexpected flaw in the inventions he uses to assist him in his latest venture, or simply bad luck, often ends up being his downfall.

In the first photo shown on The Curse of the Were-Rabbit, it is revealed that Wallace once had a full head of hair and a very thick moustache with muttonchops. In the photo that shows Gromit's graduation at Dogwarts, he had lost his beard but still had a little hair, in the form of sideburns just above his ears. In The Wrong Trousers, he still uses a hair-dryer. In A Matter of Loaf and Death, when Wallace is talking to Gromit, a picture is seen behind Gromit of Wallace with a brown beard and brown hair.

Wallace has had three love interests. The first was Wendolene Ramsbottom in A Close Shave, which ended quickly when Wendolene told Wallace that she had a calcium allergy. The second was Lady Tottington in The Curse of the Were-Rabbit, whom Wallace fondly calls "Totty". In A Matter of Loaf and Death, Wallace becomes engaged to Piella Bakewell, but this ended when she turns out to be a murderess who hated bakers and was eaten by crocodiles upon trying to escape justice. In Musical Marvels, after the montage of his three love interests, he refers to them as "the ones that got away".

=== Gromit ===
Gromit
- Wallace and Gromit character
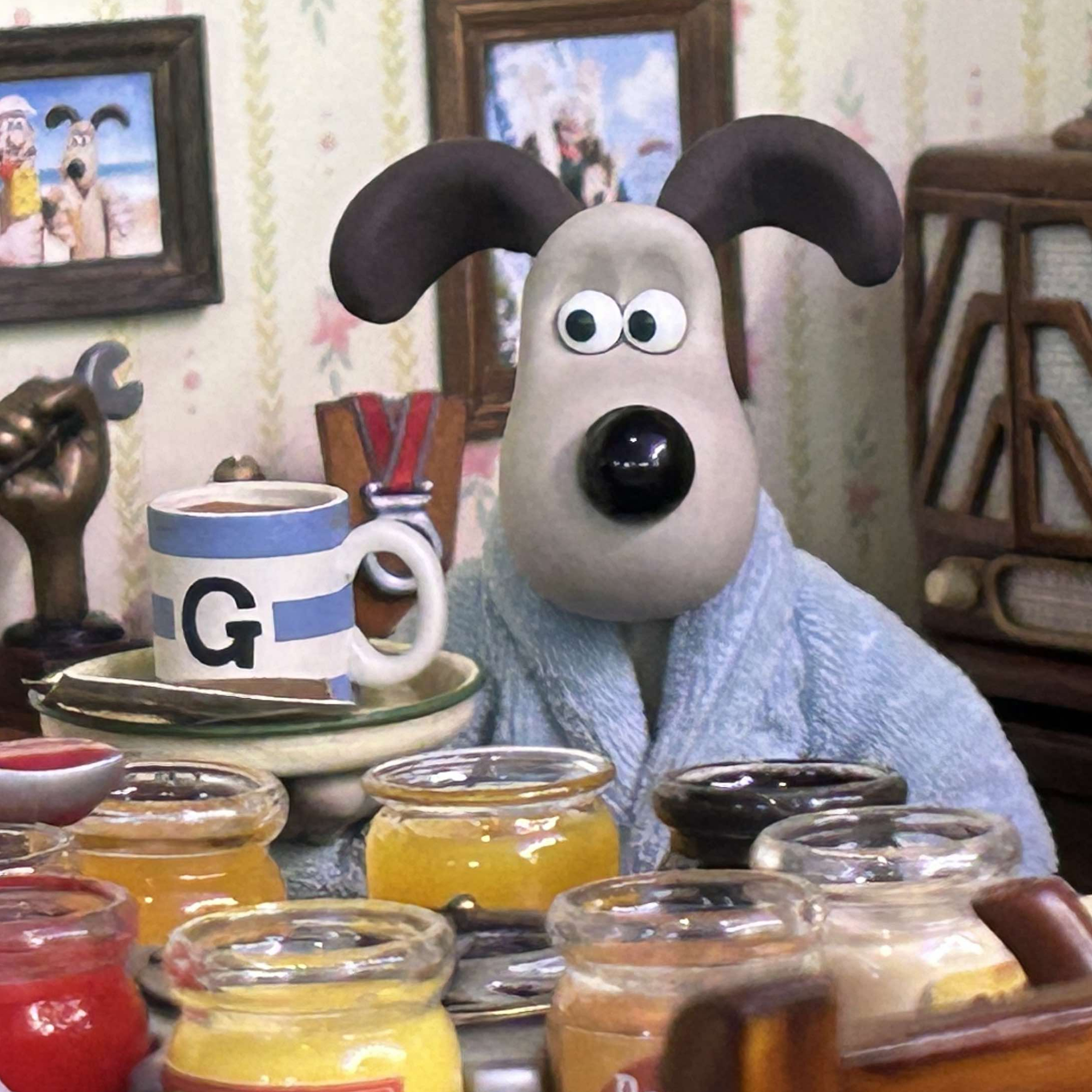
- A production model of Gromit on display
- First appearance: A Grand Day Out (1989)
- Created by: Nick Park; Steve Rushton
- Voiced by: Martin Freeman (Grand: The Autobiography of Gromit)

In-universe information
- Species: Beagle
- Gender: Male
- Home: 62 West Wallaby Street, Wigan
- Nationality: British

Gromit is a beagle who is Wallace's pet dog and best friend. Gromit is very intelligent, having graduated from "Dogwarts University" (A pun on "Hogwarts", the magic school in the Harry Potter series) with a double first in Engineering for dogs. He likes knitting, playing chess, reading the newspaper, tea, and cooking. His prized possessions include his alarm clock, dog bone, brush, and a framed photo of himself with Wallace. He is very handy with electronic equipment and an excellent airplane pilot. He often threatens the plans of the villains he and Wallace encounter in their adventures.

Gromit has no visible mouth and expresses himself through facial expressions and body language. Peter Hawkins originally intended to voice Gromit, but Park dropped the idea when he realized how Gromit's expressions could easily be made through small movements. Despite which, he has often barked in films such as The Wrong Trousers (where he also made a growl) and A Close Shave.

Many critics believe that Gromit's silence makes him the perfect straight man, with a pantomime expressiveness that drew favourable comparisons to Buster Keaton. He does at times make dog-like noises, such as yelps and growls. Nick Park says: "We are a nation of dog-lovers and so many people have said: 'My dog looks at me just like Gromit does!'"

Generally speaking, Gromit's tastes are more in vogue than those of Wallace, this being one of the many ways they contrast with each other as characters. Gromit seems to have a significant interest in the encyclopedia, classical and philosophical literature, and popular culture, including film and music. Electronics for Dogs has been a firm favourite since A Grand Day Out, and in The Wrong Trousers Gromit's bookshelves feature titles such as Kites, Sticks, Sheep, Penguins, Rockets, Bones, Stars, Fish, Lassie, Canines and Poodles, while he is seen reading The Republic, by Pluto (a nod to the Disney character of the same name and a pun on Plato) and Crime and Punishment, by Fido Dogstoyevsky (a pun on Fyodor Dostoyevsky). Gromit's various possessions make extensive use of puns: A Matter of Loaf and Death features Pup Fiction (Pulp Fiction), The Dogfather (The Godfather), Where Beagles Dare (Where Eagles Dare'"), "'Bite Club (Fight Club) and The Bone Identity (The Bourne Identity) all as book titles, and Citizen Canine (Citizen Kane) as a film poster. In Vengeance Most Fowl, he is shown reading A Room of One's Own, by "Virginia Woof" (a pun on Virginia Woolf), and Paradise Lost, by "John Stilton" (a pun on John Milton). His taste in music has been shown to cover Bach, "Poochini" (a play on Puccini), "McFlea" (McFly), "The Beagles" (the Beatles), "Red Hot Chili Puppies" (Red Hot Chili Peppers), "Puppy Love" by Doggy Osmond (Donny Osmond), "The Hound of Music" (The Sound of Music) and "Walkies on the Wild Side" by Rod Lead.

Gromit gains his first love interest in A Matter of Loaf and Death, when he becomes attached to Fluffles, a poodle belonging to Piella Bakewell.

NASA named one of its new prototype Mars explorer robots after Gromit in 2005.

On 1 April 2007, HMV announced that Gromit would stand in for Nipper for a three-month period, promoting children's DVDs in its UK stores.

In 2010, Empire magazine placed Gromit first in their list of "The 50 Best Animated Movie Characters". Empire wrote: "Gromit doesn't ever say a word, but there has never been a more expressive character (animated or otherwise) to grace our screens".

In 2013 and 2018, there were auctions of two trails of 81 Gromit statues to help raise money for charity. The first one raised £3.5 million for an expansion of Bristol Royal Hospital for Children. The Gromit that attracted the highest bid was Gromit Lightyear, designed by Disney Pixar based on the Toy Story character Buzz Lightyear, which sold for £65,000.

In 2026, Gromit will speak for the first time in thirty-seven years in the upcoming audiobook Grand: The Autobiography of Gromit, with dialogue provided by Martin Freeman.

== Introduced in A Grand Day Out ==
=== The Cooker ===
The Cooker is the given name to a coin-activated robot made out of an oven and storage cabinet that patrols the Moon. It is very protective of the Moon and becomes hostile when it discovers Wallace and Gromit have landed there. It secretly has a lifelong dream of skiing.

As well as being called The Cooker, an audio adaptation of A Grand Day Out refers to it as The Moon Machine.

== Introduced in The Wrong Trousers ==
=== Feathers McGraw ===
Feathers McGraw
- Wallace and Gromit character
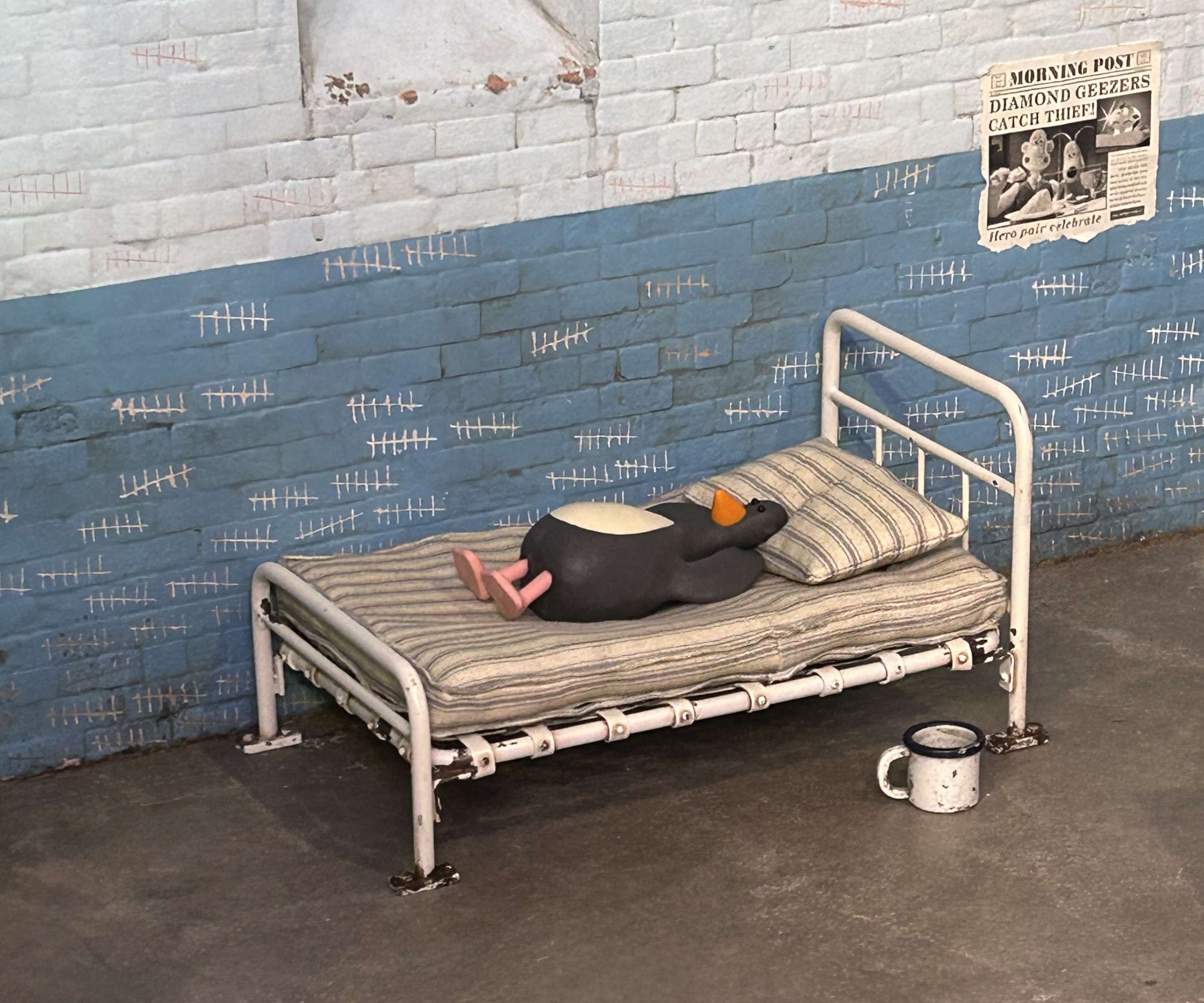
- A production model of Feathers McGraw on display
- First appearance: The Wrong Trousers (1993)
- Last appearance: Wallace & Gromit: Vengeance Most Fowl (2024)
- Created by: Nick Park; Bob Baker; Brian Sibley

In-universe information
- Species: Penguin
- Gender: Male
- Occupation: Criminal

"The definitive screen villain of our age is a penguin with a red rubber glove on its head. The gun-toting, 3ft tall criminal mastermind first terrorised viewers in 1993 Oscar-winning short The Wrong Trousers. The fact that he's mute with expressionless beady eyes only makes him more terrifying."

— Michael Hogan in The Guardian's list of greatest kid's TV villains.

Feathers McGraw is a penguin criminal mastermind who is the main antagonist in The Wrong Trousers and Wallace & Gromit: Vengeance Most Fowl.

In The Wrong Trousers, Feathers McGraw lodges with Wallace to hide from the authorities, intending to steal an expensive blue diamond using Wallace's Techno Trousers. He manages to successfully pass himself off as a chicken by wearing a red rubber glove on his head.

In Vengeance Most Fowl, the criminal penguin, now imprisoned in the town zoo, hacks into Wallace's latest invention, Norbot, to exact revenge on Wallace and Gromit, free himself from the zoo and ultimately steal the blue diamond. He manages to escape into Yorkshire on a train, but is cheated out of the diamond by Gromit. Following his escape, he remains at large and wanted by the police.

In A Close Shave, an inscription on the wall of the prison cell holding Gromit indicates that Feathers had previously been there. Feathers also features in the 2003 video game Wallace & Gromit in Project Zoo, in which he has taken over the zoo, then plans to enslave the animals and turn the zoo into a diamond mine. A poster of Feathers can be seen in A Matter of Loaf and Death right before Piella Bakewell enters the local zoo, maybe indicating that he has once again escaped. Feathers makes a cameo at the end of Chicken Run: Dawn of the Nugget, appearing alongside Ginger and the rest of her flock.

In February 2025, a 4 feet (1.2 meters) bronze statue of Feathers was unveiled in creator Nick Park's home city of Preston, located close to a bronze Wallace and Gromit bench at the Covered Market.

== Introduced in A Close Shave ==
=== Shaun the Sheep ===
Shaun the Sheep
- Wallace and Gromit and Shaun the Sheep character
- "Shaun the Sheep" as he appears in this own show.
- First appearance: A Close Shave (1995)
- Created by: Nick Park; Bob Baker
- Voiced by: Justin Fletcher

In-universe information
- Species: Sheep
- Gender: Male
- Nationality: British

Shaun (voiced by Justin Fletcher) is a sheep who first appears in A Close Shave. At first he was a stray lamb who was being transported by Preston but broke free of the truck containing him. He unintentionally barges into Wallace and Gromit's house and is occasionally seen in some of their antics. After his wool was accidentally shaved and knitted into a tiny sweater by one on Wallace's inventions, he is seen throughout the rest of the film wearing it to keep warm.

In his own 2007 series, he is the leader of the flock. He has grown into a clever, confident sheep, prone to mischief and trouble but equally adept at getting himself and his friends out of it. As there is no dialogue, Shaun communicates, like all the sheep, entirely through bleating. However, he often explains his ideas to the flock by drawing diagrams on a blackboard. He is a good friend of Bitzer, the shepherd dog, though this does not stop him from playing pranks on him.

In the 2015 spin-off film, Shaun, Bitzer and the flock go off to the big city on a mission to save The Farmer.

Like with Gromit, there was a Shaun trail statue auction in 2015 in Bristol, this time it was also held in London. It raised £1.1 million. The Gromit "globe-trotter" by Sarah Matthews sold for £28,000.

In the second film, Farmageddon, released in 2019, Shaun meets an alien named Lu-La and helps send her back into space.

A third film, The Beast of Mossy Bottom, was released in September 2026. It follows Shaun and the flock's adventure to save The Farmer when he is accidentally turned into a hairy beast.

=== Wendolene Ramsbottom ===
Wendolene (voiced by Anne Reid) is the owner of the town's Wool Shop and Wallace's first love interest. She was the owner of Preston following her father's death. She grows fond of Wallace. At the end of A Close Shave, Wallace tries to warm up to her by inviting her to his house for cheese but is heartbroken when he learns it brings her out in a rash, meaning they can only be friends.

=== Preston ===
Preston is a cyber-dog (robot) invented by Wendolene's father, and is the main antagonist in A Close Shave. Preston was created to watch over and protect Wendolene after her father was gone, but the cyber-dog subsequently turned out to be evil. He forces Wendolene to assist him in a sheep kidnapping operation that turns them into dog food and restocks the Wool Shop. When put in control of the Mutton-O-Matic, he sees an opportunity to make use of all the shorn sheep.

He is a spoof of the Terminator as he has a robotic endoskeleton under fake fur.

== Introduced in other media ==
=== Mr Patel ===
Mr Patel is Wallace's next door neighbour who lives at 64 West Wallaby Street. He is a pigeon racer and has a flock of pigeons living in his back garden. Which makes life difficult for Wallace and Gromit whenever they hang their washing out to dry. He is also an expert with the shipping forecast which helps him with his pigeon racing. Mr Patel appears in the comics and audio adaptations of Anoraknophobia and Crackers in Space.

=== Bill Cheesy Cheeseman ===
Bill Cheeseman is a famous cheese maker from Wensleydale and is the identical twin brother of Chalky. He has blonde hair and moustache and has a curl on top of his head. He is often bright and friendly and has a cheerful personality. He's also becomes Wendolene's love interest, which Wallace hesitantly accepts. In the comics, he is twice kidnapped by Chalky and ends up being saved by Wallace and Gromit. Bill only appears in the comics and audio adaptations of The Curse of the Ramsbottoms and Crackers in Space.

=== Chalky Cheeseman ===
Chalky, otherwise known as Rhett Leicester (a pun on Red Leicester cheese), is the identical twin of Bill Cheeseman. While Bill is good at heart, Chalky is the exact opposite: he is cruel and evil. It was discovered that when he was young, he had been caught tampering with other cheese mongers' cheeses at a competition, lacing them with chalk. This sent him on the path of evilness when he swore to get revenge on them. Years later, he had gotten engaged to Wendolene and moved in with her at Ramsbottoms Hall (a country estate which she inherited). With the help of robot gnomes, scarecrows, and a rebuilt Preston, he begins once again to tamper with the cheese makers, by spreading soap flakes in pastures where cows graze. He hopes that the soap flakes will become part of the milk yield, thus making the other cheese makers go out of business, so that only his cheese, known as Wendolenedale, remains.

=== Archie ===
A polar bear cub who appeared in the video game, Wallace & Gromit in Project Zoo. Having been adopted by Wallace and Gromit, the duo go to West Wallaby Zoo to celebrate Archie's birthday, only to find that he is being held captive by Feathers McGraw during his takeover of the zoo. Unlike the other baby animals who were caged, Archie serves as Feathers' main hostage throughout the game, being held by a collar and rope by the penguin as Wallace and Gromit pursued them throughout his diamond operation within the zoo. Eventually, the duo successfully rescue Archie and reunite him with his parents while Feathers is once again incarcerated in the same penguin enclosure from The Wrong Trousers. Returning home, Wallace and Gromit celebrate Archie's birthday with his parents and the other zoo animals in attendance. He is shown to be very fat and wearing round glasses as well as a red and green scarf in a photograph with Wallace and Gromit.

== Introduced in The Curse of The Were-Rabbit ==
=== Lady Campanula Tottington ===
Lady Campanula Tottington (voiced by Helena Bonham Carter) is a wealthy yet virtuous spinster with a keen interest in both vegetable-growing and fluffy animals. The moment Wallace first meets her, he is instantly smitten with her. For more than five centuries, her family has hosted an annual vegetable competition, in which Gromit wants to compete. Tottington asks Wallace to call her "Totty" (which is a British term for attractive upper-class women) when she develops a romantic interest in him. Her forename, Campanula, is also the name of a bellflower and her surname is taken from the town of the same name in Greater Manchester. In the end, she opens a "Bunny Sanctuary" for all Wallace and Gromit's captured rabbits and they still visit each other and remain good friends (as shown in television commercials).

=== Lord Victor Quartermaine ===
Lord Victor Quartermaine (voiced by Ralph Fiennes) is an arrogant and sadistic upper-class bounder who is fond of trophy hunting and the main antagonist in The Curse of the Were-Rabbit, he wears a toupee and is rarely seen without his rifle and his hunting dog Philip. His hunting rifle is apparently a high caliber bolt-action model. He despises Anti-Pesto. It soon becomes clear that Victor's only interest in Lady Tottington is her vast fortune which he is eager to get his hands on. After Tottington discovers that Victor knew about Wallace's connection to the Were-Rabbit the whole time, he drops his act and reveals that he never cared for her and all he wanted was her fortune and to get Wallace out of the way. In the film's climax, he is defeated and foiled, after which Grommit dresses Victor in the female Were-Rabbit costume to have the angry mob chase him away. His surname is similar to Allan Quatermain, the British novelist H. Rider Haggard's big-game hunter character.

=== Philip ===
Philip is Victor's vicious but cowardly hunting dog who resembles a Miniature Bull Terrier, and was the secondary antagonist of The Curse of the Were-Rabbit. He and his master will do anything to stop the Were-Rabbit, although Philip is bright enough to know that the Were-Rabbit is beyond his hunting skills and that Gromit, closer to his own size, is a better prospect as the target of premeditated violence. He also owns a lady's purse decorated with a flower for spare change.

=== Mrs. Mulch ===
Mrs. Mulch (voiced by Liz Smith) is a prominent, tough woman who has a maternal fixation on her gigantic pumpkin. She also makes a cameo in Vengance Most Fowl walking her dog during the narrowboat chase. Mr. Mulch (voiced by Dicken Ashworth) speaks very little and has a pair of dentures, which he accidentally used briefly to knock out a thieving rabbit.

=== Miss Thripp ===
Miss Thripp (voiced by Geraldine McEwan) is a neurotic spinster who goes to pieces over her fears for the vegetable competition's future after the truth of the Were-Rabbit is revealed. She reappears in a cameo in Vengeance Most Fowl walking a dog during the climatic narrow boat chase.

=== Mr. Growbag ===
Mr. Growbag (voiced by Edward Kelsey) is an elderly resident of Wallace and Gromit's neighbourhood and a founding member of the town's veg growers' council: he constantly recalls memories of incidents from previous Vegetable Competitions—comparing them to what may happen to the forthcoming one. Two of the "disasters" he mentions are The Great Slug Blight of '32, "when there were slugs the size of pigs", and the Great Duck Plague of '53.

=== Hutch ===
Originally just another captive rabbit, Hutch receives special treatment, and his name, after an attempt to brainwash him and his fellows goes wrong. He was the first to be suspected of being the Were-Rabbit. Everything that Hutch says is a quotation from Wallace (though, surprisingly, some of the lines were originally spoken by Wallace after the incident with the Mind-Manipulation-O-Matic). Hutch wears clothes like Wallace's, including his slippers and tank top, and carries his human traits as shown when he is the only one who can fix the Mind-O-Matic.

=== The Were-Rabbit ===
Beware the moon! In the dark of the night, someone or something has been terrorizing the gardens and veg-plots in Wallace and Gromit's neighborhood. When it turns out to be a giant veg-eating-rabbit-monster, it's up to the Anti-Pesto team to track it down and prevent it from ruining Lady Tottington's competition. Gromit does his best, but Wallace never seems to be around to help out when the monster strikes. Later in the movie, it's revealed that the Were-Rabbit was in fact Wallace.

=== Police Constable Albert Mackintosh ===
Police Constable Albert Mackintosh (voiced by Peter Kay) is a local policeman who judges the Giant Vegetable Contest. With the havoc it creates every year, however, he would rather it did not happen at all. By Vengeance Most Fowl, he has risen through the ranks to Chief Inspector, and is close to retirement. His final duty is to present the Blue Diamond's return to the museum, after years of being secured in a safe following Feather's arrest.

=== Reverend Clement Hedges ===
Reverend Clement Hedges (voiced by Nicholas Smith) is the local vicar and the first person in the village to witness the Were-Rabbit. He describes the full horror of his encounter with the beast, but Victor refuses to believe him. However, when Victor discovers the true identity of the beast, he turns to the vicar for advice on how to kill it. Reverend Hedges appears to have a wide range of knowledge on the habits and the slayings of supernatural animals and has a whole cupboard filled with the weapons to defeat them. Although his name appears in the credits, it is never said in the film.

== Introduced in A Matter of Loaf and Death ==
=== Piella Bakewell ===
Piella Bakewell (voiced by Sally Lindsay) is the main antagonist of A Matter of Loaf and Death. She was formerly the mascot of Bake-O-Lite Bread, but was dismissed after becoming too overweight to ride the Bake-O-Lite Balloon, so she begins affairs with a chain of 12 local bakers before murdering them, believing it was their fault for her becoming overweight. With her charming nature and captivating smile, Piella is normally seen as very kind but she is actually very angry, fierce, evil and revealed as the serial killer, who intends for Wallace to become the 13th of her "baker's dozen". Having grown rich from her modelling days, she lives in a mansion filled to the brim with mementos of her former glory: at the end she gets eaten by a crocodile when she escapes Wallace using the Bake-O-Lite Balloon, which cannot take her weight. She pretends to fall in love with Wallace; however, she actually hates him. She has a poodle called Fluffles.

=== Fluffles ===
Fluffles (voiced by Melissa Collier) is Piella's beautiful if slightly nervous pet poodle. Withdrawn and lacking in confidence owing to many years of unkind treatment, Fluffles is nonetheless a caring soul who strikes a romantic chord with Gromit. Piella acts very kindhearted to her but at the end she is very cruel towards Fluffles. When Piella dies at the end, Fluffles joins Wallace and Gromit's side. Fluffles then continues with Wallace and Gromit and they all sell bread together.

=== Baker Bob ===
Baker Bob (voiced by Ben Whitehead) is a baker who was killed by Piella. It is her 12th murder crime. Right at the start of the film, Piella is shown killing Baker Bob with a rolling pin.

== Introduced in Shaun the Sheep ==
=== Bitzer ===
The Farmer's loyal, long-suffering sheepdog, Bitzer dresses for work in a blue knit cap, black collar, knitted wristlet, and large official-looking wrist-watch. He carries a clipboard and walks upright or on all fours as needed. He communicates, canine-fashion, via barks, growls, and the occasional whimper. He also gives instructions to the flock by blowing a whistle. Despite a tendency to be caught listening to music, he takes his job very seriously, to the point of occasionally letting his power go to his head. He is, however, a generally good friend to Shaun and does his best to keep the whole flock out of trouble. He is sensible and a stickler for the rules. Bitzer usually does a good job of keeping Shaun in check. But in the movie, even he can not put the brakes on Shaun's crazy plans for a day away from the farm. An experienced 'peace-keeper', Bitzer is used to covering Shaun's tracks and shielding Farmer from his frequent mischief-making. Torn between his job as a faithful companion to Farmer and the role of 'big brother' to Shaun, Bitzer always tries to do the best for everyone. But Shaun's latest antics test Bitzer's patience to the limit.

=== Shirley ===
She is the biggest member of the flock. A gentle giant, she is usually seen placidly eating, though she is intimidating enough to have defended Shaun from Pidsley the cat. She is so big that large objects routinely disappear into (or are deliberately hidden in) her fleece. She quite often gets stuck herself, needing the other sheep to push, pull or even sling-shot her out of trouble. However, her size can also come in very handy when what is needed is a battering ram or similarly immovable object.

She is happy to tag along when Shaun proposes an adventure. Shirley is delighted to find that the Big City is a treasure trove of new foods, a welcome change from chewing on grass.

=== Timmy ===
Shaun's little cousin is the flock's only lamb, and thus often the innocent centre of the chaos. He appears to be a toddler in this series and is often seen sucking a dummy. The spinoff series Timmy Time chronicles his later adventures in preschool. He enjoys being in the spotlight. He is three years old in sheep years and later turns four years old in the episode "Timmy's Birthday". In many of the episodes he gets into trouble; however, he learns from his mistakes and often tries to help the other characters out when he can. Timmy's noise is "baaa"; he is the smallest member of the flock. Timmy always has a smile on his face and loves to tag along with his hero Shaun. Wherever Shaun goes, Timmy follows, even if that means getting into the odd scrape or two. Never seen without his orange teddy, Timmy might be teeny but he is as bright as a button and has some unexpected uses when the flock hits the Big City. There is no way he's missing out on the fun, and in the movie, Timmy gets a little more excitement than he bargained for.

Timmy got his own TV series in 2009, in which he went to preschool with his friends. The series led to two short films in 2011 and 2012 – a Christmas and a summer show, respectively.

=== Timmy's mother ===
Timmy's mother and Shaun's aunt, who wears curlers in her topknot and is a bit careless about maternal duties, even using Timmy once as a makeshift paintbrush. But when her offspring goes astray, she is inconsolable until he is safely back in her care. She likes to look her best, even when she is running around keeping an eye on her energetic offspring. Something of a 'mother figure' to the rest of the flock, Timmy's Mum keeps a watchful eye over the Mossy Bottom gang, but she can not always steer them away from trouble. When the flock takes off to find the Farmer in the Big City, she follows close behind, using her motherly instincts to keep everybody safe in this big and scary new world.

=== Nuts ===
He is quite an eccentric but useful sheep and usually, like the rest of the flock, accompanies and helps Shaun. his major difference from the flock is that he has two different shaped eyes. he is shown to have an unusual way of looking at the world that sometimes confuses his woolly companions. A classic 'daydreamer' who lives in a world of his own. No one knows what goes on his head but he brings his own unique skills to the table when the flock finds themselves deposited in the middle of the Big City.

=== The Flock ===
The flock tends to follow Shaun and one another, like typical sheep, and are obedient to orders and generally form one big happy, if sometimes fractious, family group. Unlike Shaun, however, they are not particularly bright, which becomes a problem when combined with their ongoing fascination with the human world. It's usually Shaun and Bitzer who sort out the resulting mess.

=== Jim and Glynn The Twins ===
Sheep who are twins. Glynn has a much oval head while Jim sheep has a slightly flat top

=== Hazel ===
A member of the flock who jumps at the slightest thing and is usually heard bleating nervously.

=== The Farmer ===
The Farmer is a bespectacled, balding man who runs the farm with Bitzer at his side and acts as the flock's primary if unwitting nemesis. His livestock's main concern is to ensure he remains completely oblivious to their unusual sentience, a task made easier by his conventional, unobservant nature but complicated by his enthusiasm for picking up new hobbies. He can be heard frequently making wordless noises or muttering under his breath just audibly enough for the viewer to pick up on his meaning. His disastrous attempts at dating are a running joke of the series. In the 2015 movie, he is referred to as Mr. X by those who do not know his identity. Poor Farmer thinks he has got it all under control down at Mossy Bottom Farm. As he potters around the fields, his faithful dog Bitzer by his side, Farmer is completely blind to the mischief going on right under his nose. Though he is prone to the occasional grump, Farmer and the animals rub along well most of the time, even if their madcap escapades cause all sorts of chaos and destruction. A man of simple tastes who likes the quiet life, Farmer enjoys nothing more than a cup of tea in front of the TV after a hard day farming. In the 2019 sequel, he builds an Alien theme park called Farmageddon in order to raise funds for a new combine harvester.

The Farmer makes a brief cameo appearance in Wallace & Gromit: Vengeance Most Fowl.

=== The Naughty Pigs ===
The Naughty Pigs are a group of swine, whose pen is adjacent to the sheep-field, and are bullies to Shaun and his flock, always trying to antagonize them and get them into trouble. They are, however, scared of Bitzer (though they still take the chance to bully him whenever possible).

=== Pidsley ===
Pidsley is the Farmer's orange cat, a minor character in series 1 and the main antagonist of series 2. He desires to be the sole recipient of the Farmer's attention and thus is jealous of Bitzer. He also dislikes the sheep, thinking them stupid and beneath him.

=== Mower Mouth ===
Mower Mouth is a goat who first appears in the episode of the same name, is an unstoppable eating machine. While not an unfriendly character, all his considerable energy is focused on his next meal. He thus routinely causes trouble for Shaun and the flock.

=== The Bull ===
The Bull is belligerent, powerful, and easily provoked by Shaun's antics and the colour red. He first appears in the episode of the same name.

=== The Ducks ===
The Ducks make frequent appearances. In the first series, a single duck suffers collateral damage owing to Shaun's exploits in "Off the Baa!", "Tidy Up", and "Bath Time". Sometimes the duck is seen with his lady friends. In series two there are two ducks; in series three, they have once again been replaced with a single, pure white duck.

=== The Aliens ===
The Aliens appear in "Shaun Encounters", "The Visitor", "Caught Short Alien", "Cat Got Your Brain" and briefly in "Spring Lamb". They are green and have one large eye on the top of their heads. Despite their clearly advanced scientific technology—which frequently causes trouble for the farm animals—they exhibit human-like behaviour and generally jovial personalities.

=== The Granny ===
The Granny is a short-tempered, short-sighted old lady, appearing in "Takeaway" and "Save the Tree", "Two's Company" and "The Big Chase". She is renowned for hitting people (or animals) with her handbag when they annoy her.

=== The Pizza Delivery Boy ===
A young man who rides a moped (which Bitzer often "borrows" to chase after the sheep) the Pizza Delivery Boy works in the local pizzeria. He also moonlights as a postman in "Saturday Night Shaun".

=== The Farmer's Girlfriend ===
The Farmer's Girlfriend appears for the first time in series 2. She appears to be adventurous and an animal lover, patting Bitzer and Shaun and offering food to Timmy.

=== The Farmer's Niece ===
Appearing in "The Farmer's Niece" and "The Rabbit", the Farmer's Niece appears to be a fan of horses and irritates Shaun, Bitzer and the flock. She is also one of the few humans to know what the flock is up to.

== Introduced in Timmy Time ==
=== Harriet ===
Harriet is a heron who speaks through caws and clicks. She is one of two teachers: her noises are squawks and caws.

=== Osbourne ===
Osbourne is an owl who is the other teacher in the class. He is father to Otus. Osbourne's noise is "hoot hoot".

=== Yabba ===
Yabba is a duck very similar to Timmy in personality and very friendly with him. Yabba's noise is a quack.

=== Paxton ===
Paxton the piglet is characterised by his appetite for food and his weight. He wears a blue sweater and is never seen without it. Paxton's noise is an oink.

=== Mittens ===
Like other kittens, Mittens hates getting her fur dirty (or wet) and is rather sensitive. Mittens's noise is "mee-ew-ew".

=== Ruffy ===
Ruffy is an energetic puppy, but he can be mentally rather slow. Ruffy's noise is "rowf".

=== Apricot ===
Apricot is a hedgehog pup. She is very quiet and skittish. When startled or frightened by someone or something she rolls up into a ball. Apricot's noise is "hicoooo", though she rarely speaks.

=== Stripey ===
Stripey is a badger cub. He is a bit sleepy and slow as badgers are nocturnal. Stripey's noise is "eh-eh".

=== Kid ===
Kid is a goat kid. He has a large appetite like Paxton and chews anything in sight. Kid's noise is "meh".

=== Otus ===
Otus the owlet enjoys helping and looks up to his father, Osbourne. He can typically be found reading and is very sensitive, sometimes copying Osbourne. Otus is commonly mistaken for a woman owing to his feminine voice and pink and purple feathers. Otus's noise is "too-hoo".

=== Finlay ===
Finlay is an excitable fox pup, full of energy, whose noise is "yip-yap".

=== Bumpy ===
Bumpy is a green caterpillar, who is not part of the class but has many background appearances in the show. Bumpy makes a soft purring noise.

== Introduced in Shaun the Sheep Movie ==
=== Slip ===
Slip is introduced in Shaun the Sheep Movie. She may not be the prettiest pooch on the block, but Slip is simply adorable. With her goofy teeth and helpful, gentle nature, Slip only has to bat her long eyelashes to make a new friend, and it is not long before Shaun falls under her spell. At the end, she is adopted by a bus driver with similar dental abnormalities.

=== A. Trumper ===
An animal warden who despises animals, Trumper is the film's main antagonist—a power-hungry zealot who rules the city's animal shelter with an iron grip. With his high-tech equipment and all-seeing eyes, nothing escapes his attention. At the end of the film, he gets launched by the bull into a manure pile, and is later fired. The credits reveal that he is also demoted to a food company in a chicken suit after the trouble he caused.

=== Meryl ===
The owner of the hair salon the amnesiac Farmer works at.

=== The Celebrity ===
The Celebrity is given a haircut by The Farmer, and also witnessed the restaurant incident earlier in the film.

== Introduced in The Farmer's Llamas ==
=== The Llamas ===
The Llamas (Hector, Raul and Fernando) are three prank-pulling llamas who are bought by the Farmer after being tricked by Shaun. Hector is the short's main antagonist. In the end, Hector and his minions get pulled away by a bald man and they were played by their buyer's daughter which they weren't pleased about.

== Introduced in A Shaun the Sheep Movie: Farmageddon ==
=== Lu-La ===
Voiced by Amalia Vitale. An alien child from another planet introduced in A Shaun the Sheep Movie: Farmageddon.

=== Agent Red ===
A woman who runs the Ministry of Alien Detection (MAD) and is worried with aliens, as a result of seeing Lu-La's parents when she was a girl and being humiliated at school when she mentioned it. She's the (former) main antagonist of the second film.

=== Mugg-1N5 ===
A robotic probe that works for Agent Red and the MAD.

=== The Hazmats ===
A group of people wearing hazmat suits that work for MAD.

=== Ub-Do and Me-Ma ===
The parents of Lu-La.

=== Farmer John ===
A farmer who witnesses Lu-La's arrival.

== Introduced in Vengeance Most Fowl ==
=== Norbot ===
A robotic gnome voiced by Reece Shearsmith and invented by Wallace to do jobs around the house, but develops a mind of its own. The criminal penguin Feathers McGraw, now imprisoned in a zoo, hears about Norbot on television. He hacks into Wallace's computer and reprograms Norbot to serve him, and create several more gnomes. While working at homes around the city, the gnomes steal several objects.

When the gnomes are set to an "evil" personality, they have completely black eyes. Each gnome has a reset button on its back, that resets it to Wallace's original settings.

=== Police Constable Mukherjee ===
A new officer on the police force and Chief Inspector Mackintosh's highly enthusiastic and plucky young protegee, voiced by Lauren Patel. Mukherjee is very in tune to the string of robberies around town, and the first to direct the evidence of the thefts to Wallace, though she is able to correctly deduce Feathers McGraw as the true culprit of the blue diamond's theft and plot to frame Wallace and Gromit, even if this initially means going against Mackintosh's orders (although Mackintosh had earlier instructed her to use her gut, rather than what she learned in training). She is promoted to Chief Inspector at the end of the film following Mackintosh's retirement from the force, and continues with the effort to pursue Feathers, who remains at large after escaping into Yorkshire.

=== Onya Doorstep ===
A news reporter for Up North News, voiced by Diane Morgan. She twice interviews Wallace: firstly for the success of his business, later after the kidnapping of the pumpkins.

=== Anton Deck ===
The presenter of Up North News.

== Introduced in The Beast of Mossy Bottom ==
=== The Vet ===
The local vet of Mossingham, voiced by Nina Sosanya, whom the Farmer has a crush on.

=== Shop Keeper ===
A shopkeeper in Mossingham, voiced by Paul Whitehouse.

=== Influencer ===
A social media influencer from Mossingham, voiced by Dani Dyer.

=== The Captain ===
A sea captain outside Mossingham, voiced by Chris Morrell.
