= Comparator system =

Particular organisation of neurons

A comparator system, or simply comparator, in the fields of biophysics, biology, and neurology is a particular organisation of neurons. Comparators, as their name suggests, compare several inputs of internal or external information, and are important to the field of neural learning. In biological systems, comparators help an organism adapt to changes in its surroundings.
