= Wallace & Gromit: Vengeance Most Fowl =

2024 animated film by Nick Park and Merlin Crossingham

- Official Netflix release poster
- Directed by: Nick Park; Merlin Crossingham
- Screenplay by: Mark Burton
- Story by: Nick Park; Mark Burton
- Based on: Wallace & Gromit by Nick Park
- Produced by: Richard Beek
- Starring: Ben Whitehead; Peter Kay; Lauren Patel; Reece Shearsmith
- Cinematography: Dave Alex Riddett
- Edited by: Dan Hembery
- Music by: Lorne Balfe; Julian Nott
- Production company: Aardman Animations
- Distributed by: BBC (United Kingdom); Netflix (worldwide)
- Release dates: 27 October 2024 (AFI); 25 December 2024 (BBC); 3 January 2025 (Netflix)
- Running time: 79 minutes
- Country: United Kingdom
- Language: English
- Box office: $191,452

Wallace & Gromit: Vengeance Most Fowl is a 2024 British stop-motion animated comedy film directed by Nick Park and Merlin Crossingham and written by Park and Mark Burton. The sixth installment in the Wallace & Gromit series and the second to be feature-length, the story features the return of Feathers McGraw from The Wrong Trousers (1993), who hijacks Wallace's latest invention, a robotic garden gnome named Norbot, as part of a plot for revenge. Produced by Aardman Animations, Ben Whitehead portrays Wallace in his first feature-length appearance following the death of the original actor, Peter Sallis, in 2017. The remaining voice cast consists of Peter Kay, Lauren Patel and Reece Shearsmith.

Owing to difficulties with working with DreamWorks Animation during the production of The Curse of the Were-Rabbit (2005), Park was hesitant to direct another Wallace & Gromit feature film for several years. Announced in January 2022, Vengeance Most Fowl was conceived as another thirty-minute short before expanding into a feature. The score was composed by Lorne Balfe and Julian Nott.

Wallace & Gromit: Vengeance Most Fowl premiered at the American Film Institute on 27 October 2024. It was broadcast on BBC One and BBC iPlayer on 25 December in the UK and released on Netflix internationally on 3 January 2025. After twenty-eight days, it became the BBC's most watched scripted show since 2002. The film received acclaim, holding a 100% rating on the review aggregator website Rotten Tomatoes. It was nominated in the Animated Feature categories at the Academy Awards, Golden Globe Awards and Annie Awards. At the BAFTAs, it won the inaugural award for Children's & Family Film, as well as the award for Animated Film, and was nominated for Outstanding British Film.

== Plot ==
Wallace has invented a robotic garden gnome called Norbot and opens a business hiring it out to work in gardens. Gromit feels left out and is concerned about his owner's reliance on technology, while expressing annoyance towards Norbot.

Criminal penguin Feathers McGraw hears about Norbot on the news; plotting revenge against Wallace and Gromit for foiling his theft of the Blue Diamond, (Note: As depicted in The Wrong Trousers (1993)) he hacks into and reprograms Norbot to serve him and mass-produce an army of gnomes. While working at homes around the city, the gnomes steal various objects. Chief Inspector Albert Mackintosh and his protégée, PC Mukherjee, conclude that Wallace is responsible; the latter confiscates his inventions as evidence when the gnomes are nowhere to be found.

Gromit recovers Wallace's tracking device from the police station and tracks the gnomes to the local zoo where Feathers is incarcerated. He discovers they have used the contraband to build a submarine for Feathers to escape through the sewers in. Feathers spots Gromit and has Norbot cut him from the tree he is hiding in. They fall into a nearby enclosure and the impact resets Norbot.

Gromit goes to the museum, where the Blue Diamond is being put back on display, just as Mackintosh discovers that it has been replaced with a decoy; Feathers hid the diamond at Wallace and Gromit's house in plain sight prior to his arrest. Back home, Wallace and Gromit are captured by the gnomes as Feathers recovers the diamond and detains the duo in the house's pantry.

Wallace and Gromit manage to free themselves as they pursue Feathers down a canal on narrowboats while Mackintosh and Mukherjee, the latter of whom expresses doubts about Wallace's guilt, give chase via bicycle. As Wallace engineers a method of reprogramming the gnomes, Gromit jumps aboard Feathers' narrowboat, but when Feathers sees that the police have blocked the canal, he steers off a navigable aqueduct. With the boat teetering on its parapet, Wallace convinces Gromit to surrender the bag containing the diamond to Feathers before he jumps off the narrowboat, which falls over the edge, but Gromit is rescued by Norbot and his fellow gnomes.

Feathers escapes to Yorkshire on a freight train, only to discover that Gromit had tricked him with his previous deception. In the aftermath, Wallace is exonerated, while Mackintosh praises Mukherjee for trusting her instincts and retires, passing his position to her. Wallace returns to inventing, confessing that machinery cannot replace the human touch, and Gromit gains a new respect for Norbot.

== Voice cast ==
- Ben Whitehead as Wallace, an eccentric inventor and Gromit's owner. Vengeance Most Fowl was Whitehead's first full film performance as the character following Peter Sallis' 2010 retirement and 2017 death. Whitehead had previously portrayed Wallace in video games and commercials as of 2008.
- Peter Kay as Chief Inspector Albert Mackintosh, former police constable having been promoted to chief inspector. Kay reprises his role from Wallace & Gromit: The Curse of the Were-Rabbit.
- Reece Shearsmith as Norbot, Wallace's latest invention who is designed to do jobs around his and Gromit's house, only to be reprogrammed by Feathers McGraw.
- Lauren Patel as PC Mukherjee, Mackintosh's plucky young protégée.
- Diane Morgan as Onya Doorstep, a news reporter for Up North News.
- Muzz Khan as Anton Deck, news anchor for Up North News. His name is a play on Ant & Dec.

The Farmer from the Wallace & Gromit spin-off series Shaun the Sheep makes a cameo, voiced by John Sparkes. Adjoa Andoh and Lenny Henry have cameo roles as a judge and Mr Convenience. Television presenter and radio disc jockey Roman Kemp also cameos.

== Production ==
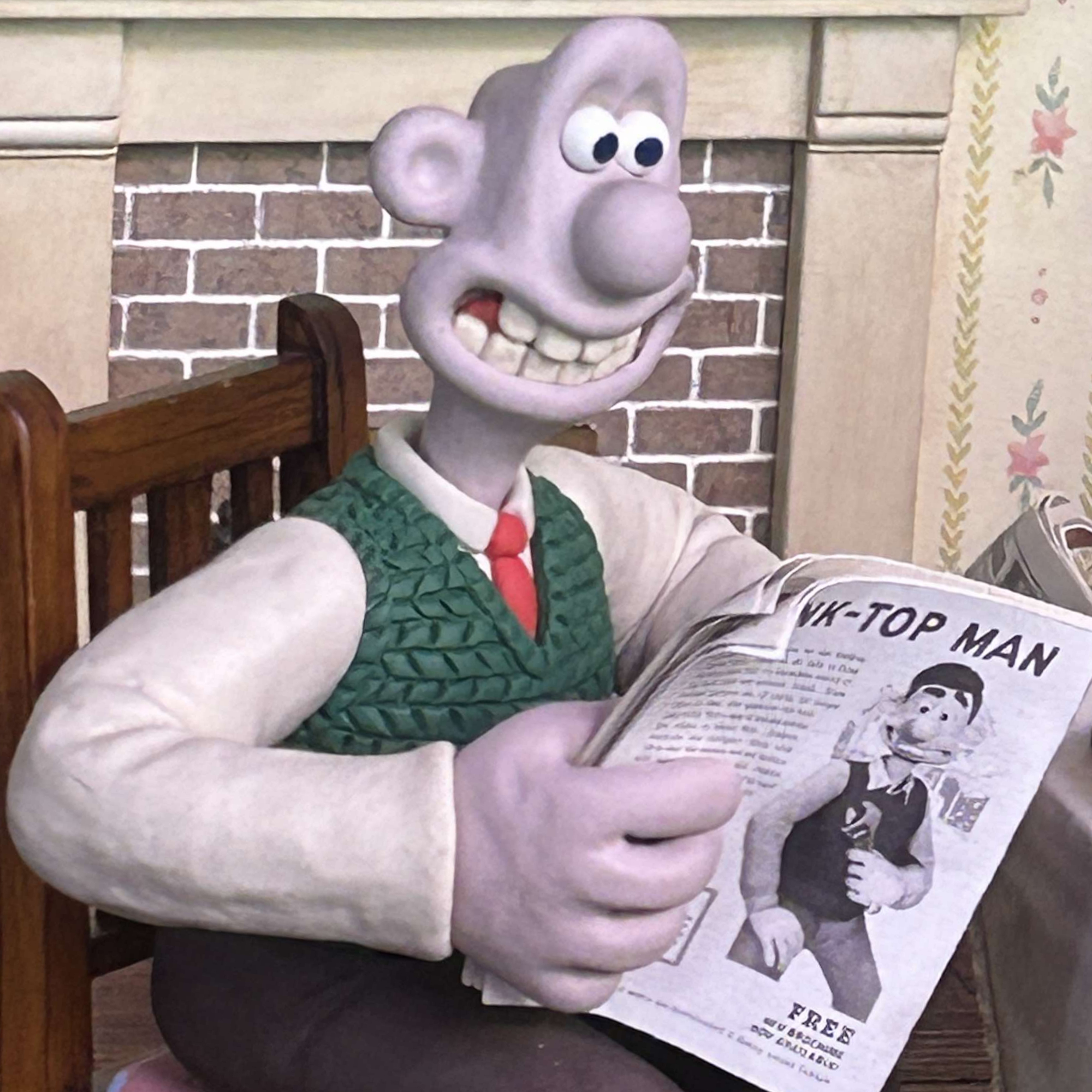
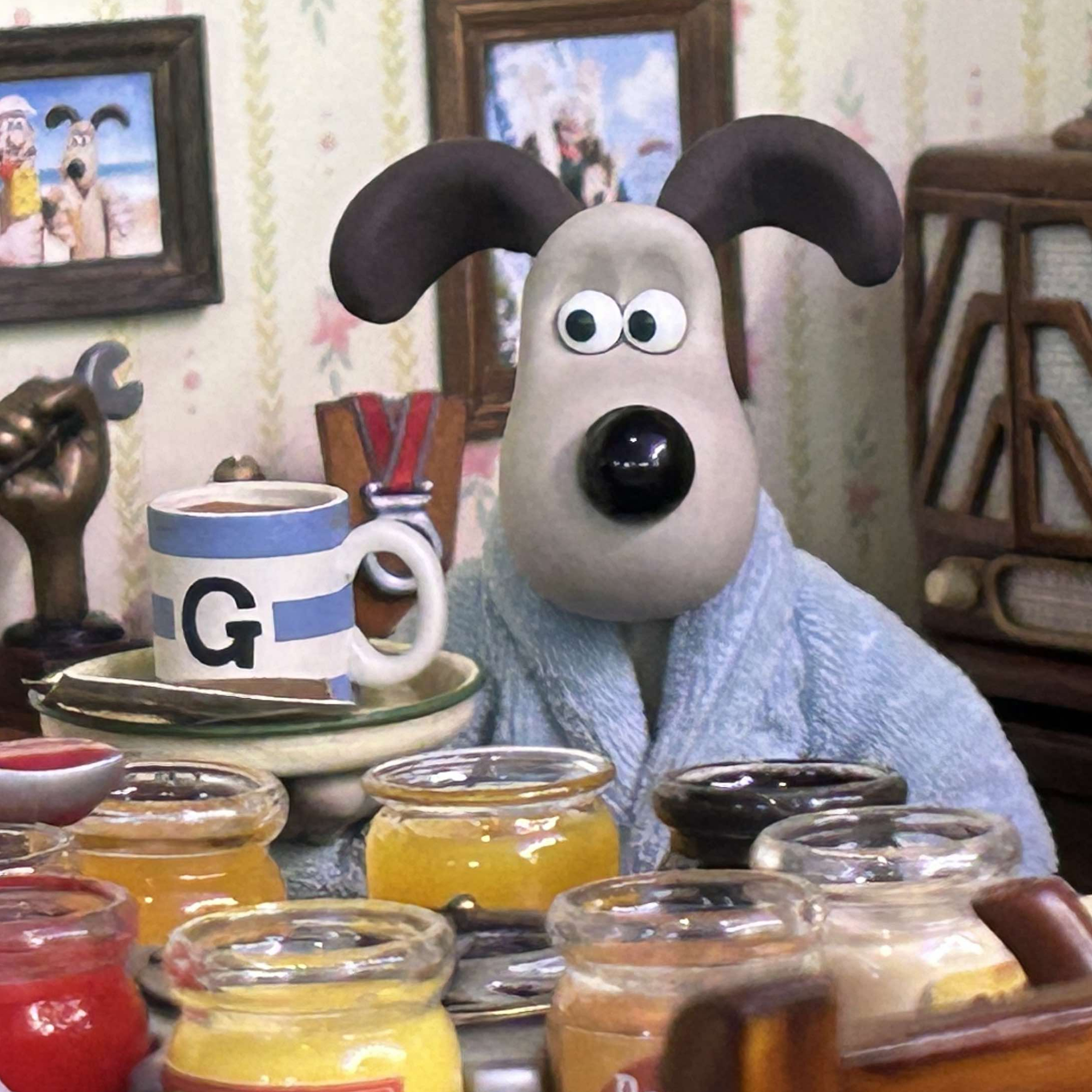
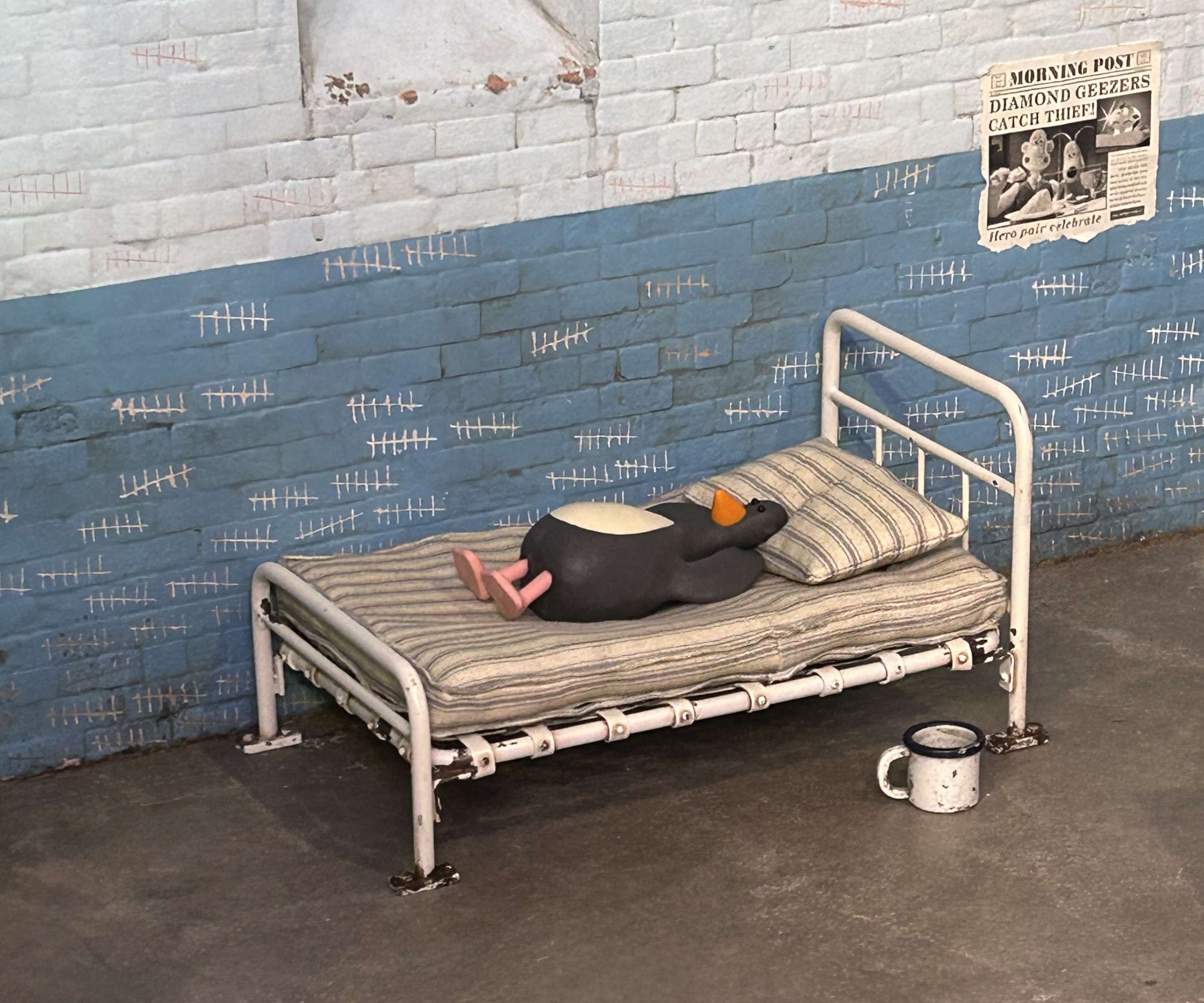
Models from Vengeance Most Fowl on display.

During production of A Matter of Loaf and Death (2008), Nick Park remarked on difficulties with working with DreamWorks Animation during the production of The Curse of the Were-Rabbit (2005), such as the constant production notes and demands to alter the material to appeal more to American children. This discouraged him from producing another feature film for years, with Peter Lord noting that Park preferred the "half hour format".

A new Wallace & Gromit film was announced in January 2022, with Park and Merlin Crossingham as directors, from a screenplay by Mark Burton, while Claire Jennings was announced to produce. Park conceived the film as another 30-minute short, which expanded into a feature film. Newclay Products, the factory that made Lewis Newplast, the modelling clay used by Aardman, shut down in March 2023; Aardman purchased enough remaining clay to cover the film. The Daily Telegraph reported that the studio may not be able to produce further films, but Aardman released a statement clarifying that it would find a new supplier.

The title was announced on 6 June 2024, alongside the reveal that Feathers McGraw, the villain of The Wrong Trousers (1993), would return. At that time, Richard Beek was announced to have replaced Claire Jennings as the producer, although Jennings would remain credited as a consulting producer.

== Music ==
The score was composed by Lorne Balfe and series composer Julian Nott, with the themes composed by Nott. Balfe previously provided additional music for Nott's score in The Curse of the Were-Rabbit (2005).

== Release ==
Vengeance Most Fowl premiered worldwide on the closing day of the AFI Fest on 27 October at the Grauman's Chinese Theatre in Hollywood, Los Angeles, with a limited theatrical release on 18 December 2024. It aired in the United Kingdom on BBC One on 25 December 2024, and was released outside of the UK on Netflix on 3 January 2025. To promote the film, the BBC also commissioned three Wallace & Gromit-themed idents for BBC One, which were aired through the Christmas season. Vengeance Most Fowl was viewed by 9.38 million BBC One viewers on Christmas Day. It was the second-most-watched broadcast in the UK since 2022, after the Gavin & Stacey Christmas special, also broadcast that day. After 28 days of catch up viewing, that figure increased to 21.6 million, becoming the BBC's most-watched scripted show since 2002. Vengeance Most Fowl is due for release on DVD, Blu-Ray, and 4K Blu-Ray on 16 November 2026.

A day after the film's airing on the BBC, Park said that it would not be the final Wallace & Gromit film, and that "there's always ideas worth kicking about".

== Reception ==
=== Critical response ===
On the review aggregator website Rotten Tomatoes, 100% of 138 critics' reviews are positive, with an average rating of 8.3/10. The website's consensus reads: "Comforting as cheese and crackers, with some gentle ribbing of modern technology sprinkled on top, Vengeance Most Fowl revives this lovable pair with all their charm intact." Metacritic, which uses a weighted average, assigned the film a score of 83 out of 100, based on 31 critics, indicating "universal acclaim".

Writing in The Guardian, Stuart Heritage called the film "a triumphant return" for a series "genetically incapable of being bad". However, he felt that the extended runtime made it "less densely packed with jokes and invention than we've become used to" and that its greater focus on dialogue was a detriment to Wallace and Gromit's international appeal. Peter Bradshaw, who also reviewed the film for The Guardian, called it an "exciting, ingenious, funny and an unmissable, ingenious Christmas treat". He also said that Ben Whitehead's performance was "an affectionate homage to the late Peter Sallis". In the Irish Independent, Vicky Jessop praised Aardman as still being "head and shoulders ahead of everybody else when it comes to delivering the warm and fuzzies", though similarly felt the film presented fewer jokes and lacked innovation compared to previous Wallace & Gromit stories. Brian Tallerico, writing for RogerEbert.com, gave the film three and a half out of four, describing it as "beautifully structured, a perfect rhythm of plotting and humor".

Manohla Dargis of The New York Times praised the film for the stop-motion animation and called it a "soul-satisfying" return for the beloved stop-motion duo. Carlos Aguilar of the Los Angeles Times said that the film is a "hilarious and expertly crafted new clay-animation caper" and that its "heroes and foes are still unequivocally human-operated". Lovia Gyarkye of The Hollywood Reporter gave the film a very strong positive review, saying that "although the film is a little predictable, the journey it has more than makes it enjoyable".

Peter Debruge of Variety said: "Although less ambitious than 'The Curse of the Were-Rabbit,' Aardman's adorable new feature gives fans what they want: the return of a cold-hearted penguin and more puns than you can count". Saffron Maeve of The Globe and Mail called the film a "rigorous artistic statement in our modern mechanized age", describing the film as "supremely sincere, warmly witty" and a "cozy return to form" for the duo. Dan Norris, who was the Mayor of the West of England at the time of the film's release, criticised the BBC and Aardman for not including a "Made in Bristol" line in the closing credits as with other successful films produced in Bristol, such as David Attenborough's nature documentaries.

=== Accolades ===
| Award | Date of ceremony | Category | Recipient(s) | Result | Ref. |
|---|---|---|---|---|---|
| Hollywood Music in Media Awards | 20 November 2024 | Best Original Score – Animated Film | Lorne Balfe & Julian Nott | Nominated | |
| Astra Film Awards | 8 December 2024 | Best Animated Feature | Wallace & Gromit: Vengeance Most Fowl | Nominated | |
| Washington D.C. Area Film Critics Association | 8 December 2024 | Best Animated Feature | Wallace & Gromit: Vengeance Most Fowl | Nominated | |
| San Diego Film Critics Society | 9 December 2024 | Best Animated Film | Wallace & Gromit: Vengeance Most Fowl | Nominated | |
| Chicago Film Critics Association Awards | 11 December 2024 | Best Animated Film | Wallace & Gromit: Vengeance Most Fowl | Nominated | |
| Chicago Film Critics Association | 12 December 2024 | Best Animated Film | Wallace & Gromit: Vengeance Most Fowl | Nominated | |
| St. Louis Film Critics Association | 15 December 2024 | Best Animated Feature | Wallace & Gromit: Vengeance Most Fowl | Runner-up | |
| San Francisco Bay Area Film Critics Circle | 15 December 2024 | Best Animated Feature | Wallace & Gromit: Vengeance Most Fowl | Nominated | |
| New York Film Critics Online | 16 December 2024 | Best Animation | Wallace & Gromit: Vengeance Most Fowl | Nominated | |
| Seattle Film Critics Society | 16 December 2024 | Best Animated Film | Wallace & Gromit: Vengeance Most Fowl | Nominated | |
| Capri Hollywood International Film Festival | 2 January 2025 | Best Animated Feature | Wallace & Gromit: Vengeance Most Fowl | Won | |
| Golden Globe Awards | 5 January 2025 | Best Animated Feature Film | Wallace & Gromit: Vengeance Most Fowl | Nominated | |
| Austin Film Critics Association | 6 January 2025 | Best Animated Film | Wallace & Gromit: Vengeance Most Fowl | Nominated | |
| Critics' Choice Movie Awards | 7 February 2025 | Best Animated Feature Film | Wallace & Gromit: Vengeance Most Fowl | Nominated | |
| American Cinema Editors Awards | 14 March 2025 | Best Edited Animated Feature Film (Theatrical or Non-Theatrical) | Dan Hembery | Nominated | |
| Satellite Awards | 26 January 2025 | Best Motion Picture – Animated or Mixed Media | Wallace & Gromit: Vengeance Most Fowl | Won | |
| Alliance of Women Film Journalists | 7 January 2025 | Best Animated Film | Wallace & Gromit: Vengeance Most Fowl | Nominated | |
| Annie Awards | 8 February 2025 | Best Animated Feature | Wallace & Gromit: Vengeance Most Fowl | Nominated | |
| Annie Awards | 8 February 2025 | Outstanding Achievement for Animated Effects in an Animated Production | Howard Jones, Rich Spence, Deborah Jane Price, Jon Biggins, Kirstie Deane | Nominated | |
| Annie Awards | 8 February 2025 | Outstanding Achievement for Character Animation in an Animated Feature Production | Carmen Bromfield Mason | Nominated | |
| Annie Awards | 8 February 2025 | Outstanding Achievement for Directing in an Animated Feature Production | Nick Park, Merlin Crossingham | Nominated | |
| Annie Awards | 8 February 2025 | Outstanding Achievement for Editorial in an Animated Feature Production | Dan Hembery | Nominated | |
| Annie Awards | 8 February 2025 | Outstanding Achievement for Music in an Animated Feature Production | Lorne Balfe, Julian Nott | Nominated | |
| Annie Awards | 8 February 2025 | Outstanding Achievement for Production Design in an Animated Feature Production | Matt Perry, Darren Dubicki, Richard Edmunds, Matt Sanders, Gavin Lines | Nominated | |
| Visual Effects Society Awards | 11 February 2025 | Outstanding Animated Character in an Animated Feature | Jo Fenton, Alison Evans, Andy Symanowski, Emanuel Nevado (for "Gromit") | Nominated | |
| Visual Effects Society Awards | 11 February 2025 | Outstanding Created Environment in an Animated Feature | Matt Perry, Dave Alex Riddett, Matt Sanders, Howard Jones (for "Aqueduct") | Nominated | |
| British Academy Film Awards | 16 February 2025 | Best Animated Film | Nick Park, Merlin Crossingham, Richard Beek | Won | |
| British Academy Film Awards | 16 February 2025 | Best Children's & Family Film | Nick Park, Merlin Crossingham, Richard Beek | Won | |
| British Academy Film Awards | 16 February 2025 | Outstanding British Film | Nick Park, Merlin Crossingham, Richard Beek, Mark Burton | Nominated | |
| Cinema Audio Society Awards | 22 February 2025 | Outstanding Achievement in Sound Mixing for Motion Picture – Animated | Will Norie, Chris Burdon, Gilbert Lake, Simon Rhodes, Nick Roberts, Adrian Rhodes | Nominated | |
| Academy Awards | 2 March 2025 | Best Animated Feature | Nick Park, Merlin Crossingham, and Richard Beek | Nominated | |
| Comedy.co.uk Awards | —N/a | Best TV Comedy Drama | Wallace & Gromit: Vengeance Most Fowl | Nominated | |
