= Covered Market, Preston =

Covered Market
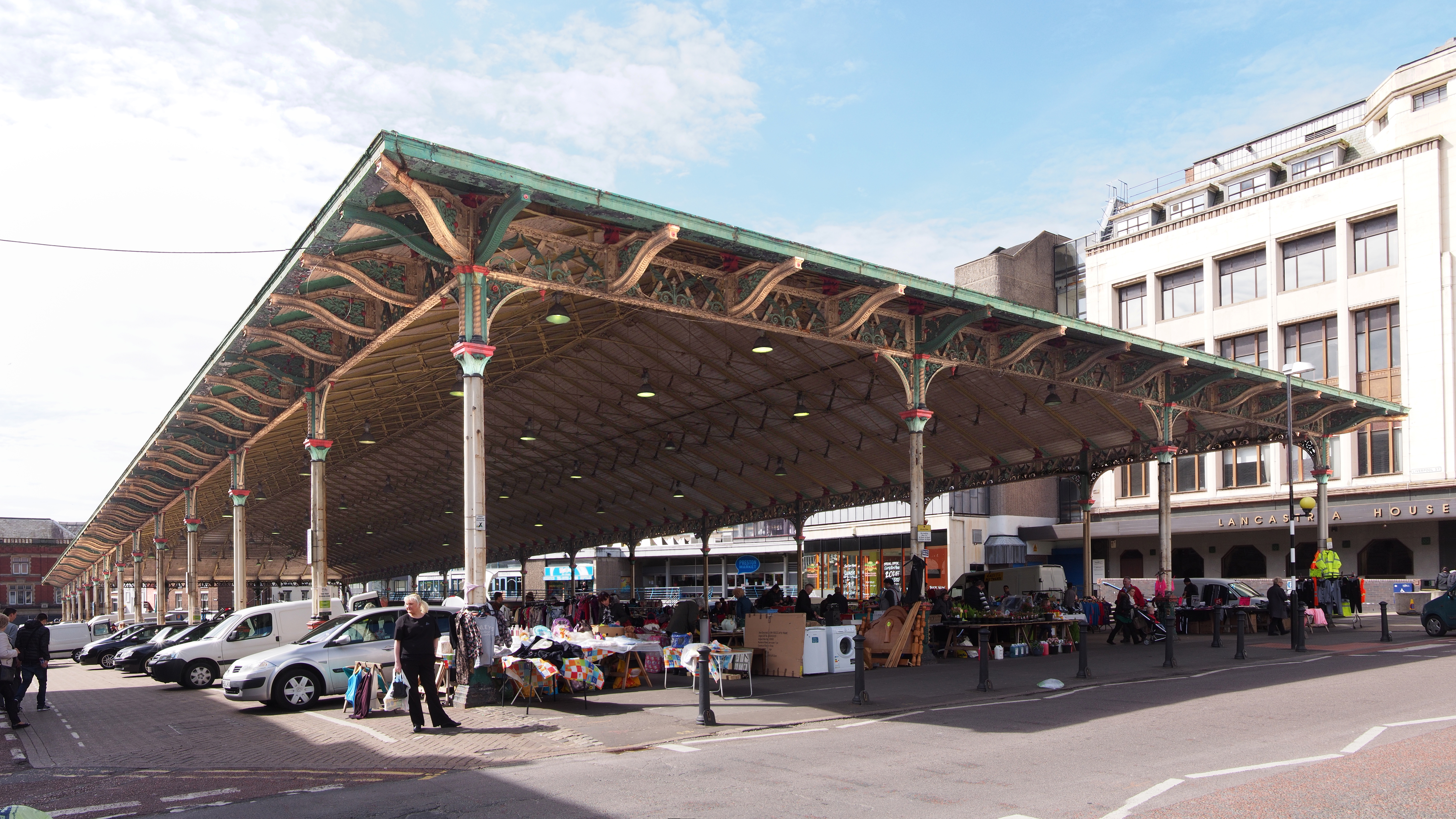
- The Covered Market in 2015

- Location within Preston city centre

General information
- Location: Preston, Lancashire, England
- Coordinates: 53.7605°N 2.6995°W
- Construction started: 1870
- Completed: 1875

Design and construction
- Architect: Edward Garlick
- Main contractor: William Allsup
- Designations

Listed Building – Grade II
- Designated: 27 September 1979
- Reference no.: 1218479

Website
- www.prestonmarkets.co.uk

The Covered Market in Earl Street, Preston, Lancashire, England is a Grade II listed landmark structure built 1870–75.

After three aborted attempts to start the project in the early 1800s, and a serious construction accident in 1870 that set back progress, the covered market was finished in 1875. Since then, new buildings have been added to the market and it has been modernized several times.

== Description ==
Built to the original specification, the covered market is built of cast iron pillars and lattice work iron roof structure supporting a wood and glass roof. It has a 90-foot span free from internal pillars, and the roof ridge slope drops 13 feet from Lancaster Road to Market Street.

Perhaps the most unusual feature is the rainwater drainage. Water from the roof is collected in a concealed gutter and transferred via the structure to drain down the centre of the hollow pillars.

== Early proposals ==
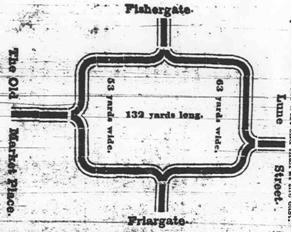
Plan for Market 1848

In 1837, the Preston Corporation began exploring a covered market. By 1841 the corporation had solicited proposals. The sites included: east of the present market, on Lune Street, and in "the Orchard". During this period, the Corporation moved the fish market to a covered area next to the corn exchange. They also restricted ‘moveable stalls’ on the streets. However, in February 1842, the Corporation stopped the project due to lack of money.

In 1846, the Preston Guardian stated that "the space allotted to the corn market has always been much larger than was needed" and that the Corn Exchange should be remodelled to create a new covered market. Nothing was done.

In 1848, the corporation began a new exploration of a covered market. They prepared a request to the British Parliament for "a sum not exceeding £40,000 upon the security of such market and the tolls, stallage, etc.". The new proposed sites were Lune Street, Friargate, Fishergate and the Old Market Place. However, the corporation again abandoned the project due to lack of funding.

In the early 1850s, the corporation again made plans for a covered market, but they were again put aside.

== Planning begins ==
In 1860, work on the Preston covered market finally began.

The corporation formed a "Town Hall and Covered Market Committee" and obtained financing through the Preston Corporation Markets Act 1861 (24 & 25 Vict. c. vii) and the Preston Improvement Act 1869.

The council minutes of the 1860s show steady expenditure on the land and properties required for the market and its access (and, indeed, income in the form of rent from the occupiers), and comment in the press catalogues the difficult negotiation between the Earl of Derby, the principal landowner and the Corporation. The papers also describes what a congested and inaccessible place Preston Town Centre was at the time, "choked by blocks of buildings" and how the requirement "for complete and broad approaches from every side" for the new market would open it up.

The journalist and local historian Terry Farrell suggests there were three plans for a covered market, and states that Edward Garlick, the Borough Treasurer and Surveyor, "visited several counties to inspect various markets"

Garlick finally proposed a market plan to the Preston Council, which they approved. The project was put out to tender in 1870. A total of ten tenders for the building contract were received ranging in cost from £6,070 to £9,480. On 19 January 1870 the council approved the tender and prepared a contract with Joseph Clayton, owner of a foundry in Greenbank Street, Preston. His £6,070 tender was the lowest submitted. Clayton was told Preston required "a commodious market without excessive cost", and a contract stipulating completion by 31 July 1870 was signed.

== Construction fiasco ==
The market site remained untouched through February and March 1871. The Council became impatient, but Clayton blamed the delay on the necessity to make all the casting at his foundry before any work could begin on site. In April 1870 the first pillars were erected. However, Clayton missed the completion date of 31 July. Council members began to press for a £50 a week penalty to be imposed on the contractor.

On Saturday 6 August 1870, ten men, five on the ground and five on the roof, were at work on the market. At approximately 7.30 am, "...all at once, without the least warning, a great portion of the vast fabric — in fact the whole which had been roofed in — fell with a tremendous crash to the ground". Contemporary historian, Anthony Hewitson, states "the roof, or as much of the roof as had up to that date, been fixed, fell, and the site presented in the centre — the roof collapsed inwardly-by disjointed principals, twisted and broken rods &c., was, indeed, most chaotic". Nine of the workers, including four from the roof, somehow managed to escape uninjured. The fifth, however, named Thomas Bateson of 6 Wells Street was seriously injured and rushed to the Infirmary where he eventually recovered.

A contemporary photograph and an illustration still exist which show total structural failure. Reports stated that 31 out of the 32 pillars had been erected, indicating that the basic structure was almost complete.

=== Collapse controversy ===
After the collapse of the unfinished covered market, controversy continued over its cause. Questions over the structural safety of the design almost immediately surfaced and went on to reach as far as the national trade press but were always firmly refuted. Lack of scaffolding support, and the fact that the pillars and roof were being constructed from Lancaster Road down the incline to Orchard Street, were other possible reasons cited.

The Council made numerous accusations against Clayton. One suggestion was that Clayton thought Garlick's design somewhat ‘over engineered’ and have cut corners. The Council finally came to believe that the building scaffolding did not have enough larch poles for support. Clayton and the Council blamed each other for this failing.

The Council wanted Clayton to complete the project, but he submitted three new proposals, at extra cost, to make the project safer. The Council rejected these proposals and allowed Clayton to withdraw from the project after repaying his original advance of £2,300 with interest.

=== New contractors ===
In 1871, the Council awarded Messrs P B Bennett and Co of Birmingham the contract to complete the covered market for £9,000. However, Bennett never started work, citing safety concerns over defects in the design. The Council refuted these and insisted on construction to the original specifications. No work proceeded

In November 1871, the Council gave the contract to William Allsup of Preston. However, Bennett did not vacate the site until April 1872. in May 1872, Allsup was able to begin work at a cost of £9,126 and five shillings.

Allsups finished construction of the Preston covered market in November 1875.

In 1878, the dispute between the Council and Bennett ended with an enforced settlement with Bennett paying £1450 for non-completion of contract,).

== Modern history ==
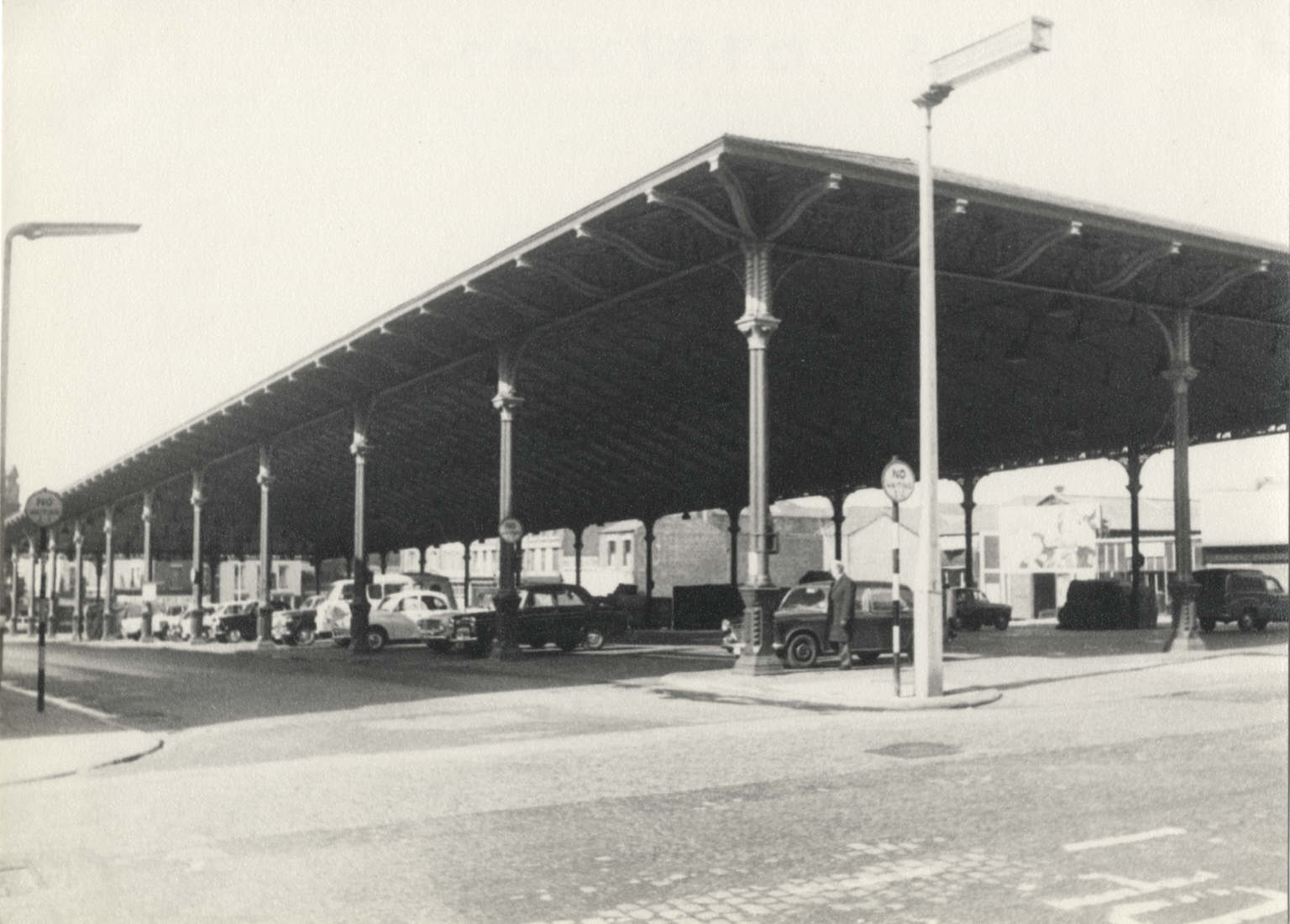
Preston Covered Market in the 1960s

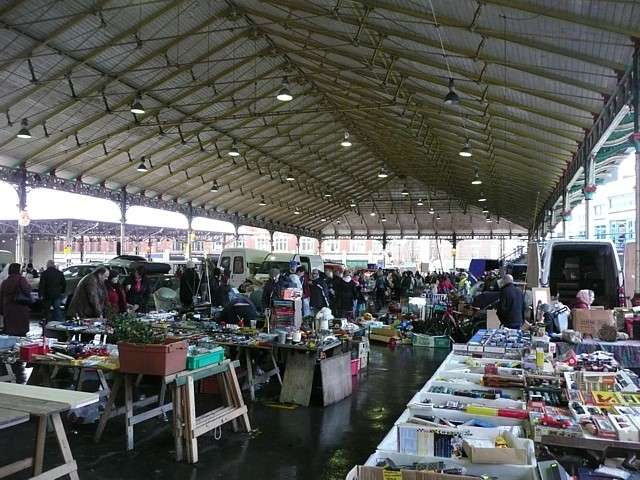
The market in 2009

The old fish market was covered in 1924. Major alterations to the Covered Market were made in 1958 when the glass skylights were removed, electric lighting was installed and the cobbled floor was replaced.

In the 1970s a market hall was built next to the covered market. In the 2010s a proposal was made for demolition of the 1970s building and construction of a cinema and restaurants on the site. A replacement would be built under the roof of the covered market at the Market Street end. The plans were approved in 2016 and in 2017 the structure was refurbished and the new market hall was built, to be opened in 2018.

In September 2021, a bronze Wallace & Gromit bench statue with Wallace in the Wrong Trousers and Gromit reading his newspaper on the bench was erected at the south market hall entrance. This was to honour the franchise's creator Nick Park who originated from Preston. Their archnemesis, Feathers McGraw, soon joined them when his statue was unveiled by Nick Park as part of the opening of the Animate extension on the 20th February 2025.

== See also ==
- Listed buildings in Preston, Lancashire
- Market (place)
- Market town

== Sources ==
=== Some references to the Covered Market in the Preston Guardian ===
- 1846 Discussion about the need for covered markets, 14 March 1846, Pg 2
- 1860 Proposed plan for Town Hall and Covered Market, 1 September 1860, Pg 4
- 1861 Covered market Preston Comment in leader, 3 August 1861, Pg 4
- 1861 Covered markets Comment in leader, 21 September 1861, Pg 4
- 1864 Covered Market Terms for purchase of land, 2 July 1864, Pg 2
- 1870 Covered Market Acceptance of J Claytons tender, 22 January 1870, Pg 4
- 1870 Covered market Fall of the roof, 13 August 1870, Pg 2
- 1871 Meeting of ratepayers about the future of the market, 21 June 1871, Pg 6
- 1871 Covered Market Comment about the market and the Town Council, 24 June 1871, Pg 5
- 1871 Another meeting of ratepayers, 26 July 1871, Pg 6
- 1871 Another meeting of ratepayers, 27 September 1871, Pg 6
- 1871 History of the covered market, 30 September 1871, Pg 4
- 1871 Covered Market Comment on contractor Mr Clayton, 7 October 1871, Pg 4
- 1871 Meeting of the markets and Town Hall Committee to investigate the delay, 7 October 1871, Pg 6
- 1871 Covered Market Contract given to Mr Allsup, 25 November 1871, Pg5
- 1872 Covered Market Messrs Bennett and Company the contractors removed their plant from the site and refused to proceed with the building of the market, 20 April 1872, Pg 5
- 1872 Covered Market Memorial to the Secretary of State, 24 April 1872, Pg *1872 Covered Market Letter from Mr Bennett to the town clerk about why he will not build the roof, 11 May 1872, Pg 5
- 1872 Covered Market Decided to let Mr Allsup build the market, 29 May 1872, Pg 5
- 1872 Covered Market Report on the covered market taken from the magazine Engineering, 26 June 1872, Pg 7
- 1872 Covered Market Report and comment on a meeting of the Town Council, 29 June 1872, Pg 5
- 1873 Covered Market Comment on the action of the Town Council, 27 September 1873, Pg 4
- 1873 Covered Market First meeting of the Committee of Inquiry, 18 October 1873, Pg 3
- 1875 Covered Market Completion of the block paving, 3 November 1875, Pg 5
- 1878 Covered Market Preston Corporation V Bennett at Liverpool Assizes, 12 January 1878, Pg 6

=== Some references to the Covered Market in the Preston Council Minutes ===
- 1840-41
  - 22 – motion
  - 43 – report
  - 46 – special report
- 1841-42
  - 27 – agenda (pork & fish markets)
  - 56 – schedule (moveable stalls)
  - 67 – bills
- 1850-51
  - 19 – treasurer’s report
  - 48 – resolution+
- 1860-61
  - 11 – resolution
  - 22-23 – petition for bill
- 1861-62
  - 13 - resolution
- 1863-64
  - 13 – markets & town hall committee
  - 82 – resolution (mr. garlick)
  - 91 – schedule of bills
  - 102 – resolution (mr. garlick)
  - 133 - schedule of bills
  - 163-6 – receipts/payments
- 1868-69
  - 23 & 30 – petition to parliament
  - 38 – revenue
  - 83-83 – capital/revenue
  - 84 – (Foster Cattle Market tender)
  - 105 – receipts
  - 117 – revenue
  - 6 (accounts) – expenditure
- 1869-1870
  - 50 – resolution
  - 67 – contract
  - 89 – revenue
  - 129 – expenditure
  - 1 (accounts) – assets
- 1870-71
  - 21 – revenue
  - 40 – council plan
  - 62 – revenue
  - 79-80 – revenue/receipts
  - 133-134 – capital/revenue
  - 152-168 – contract/statements & answers
  - 7 (accounts) – income
- 1877-78
  - 59 – resolution (mr. bennett)
