= Ann Hornaday =

American film critic (1960–2026)

- Hornaday in 2018
- Born: Ann Mills Hornaday; March 9, 1960; Iowa City, Iowa, U.S.
- Died: October 18, 2026 (aged 66); Baltimore, Maryland, U.S.
- Education: Smith College
- Occupations: Film journalist; critic
- Employer: The Washington Post
- Spouse: Dennis Greenia (m. 2000)
- Children: 1
- Awards: Finalist, Pulitzer Prize for Criticism

Ann Mills Hornaday (March 9, 1960 – October 18, 2026) was an American film critic at The Washington Post, and the author of Talking Pictures: How to Watch Movies (2017). In 2008, she was a finalist for the Pulitzer Prize for Criticism.

== Early life ==
Ann Mills Hornaday was born in Iowa City, Iowa, on March 9, 1960, and grew up in Des Moines, Iowa. She attended Smith College, majoring in government, graduating in 1982.

== Career ==
After graduating from college, Hornaday moved to New York to become a freelance writer, contributing to Premiere, Us and Ms. magazines; at the latter, she also worked as a researcher and assistant to Gloria Steinem, a position she held from 1983 to 1985. Hornaday began contributing to the Arts & Leisure section of The New York Times, eventually going on to become film critic at the Austin American-Statesman in 1995. In 1997 she moved to The Baltimore Sun, then to The Washington Post in 2002, following the retirement of the Post's previous critic Rita Kempley. She has also written features for Working Woman and Self magazine.

In 2008, Hornaday was a finalist for the Pulitzer Prize for Criticism, with the prize committee citing "her perceptive movie reviews and essays, reflecting solid research and an easy, engaging style".

In 2017, Hornaday published Talking Pictures: How to Watch Movies. The book, a 304-page text published with Basic Books, draws on a series Hornaday began writing in 2009 for the Post, aimed at explaining the various specialized crafts in filmmaking—like sound, editing, cinematography—to a general audience. Hornaday approached it as a journalistic project, interviewing people working in a variety of roles in film to ask them to describe what they do as well as "what they wished audiences appreciated more about their work". In a review for The New York Times, Lisa Schwarzbaum described the book as "a pleasantly calm, eminently sensible, down-the-middle primer for the movie lover—amateur, professional or Twitter-centric orator—who would like to acquire and sharpen basic viewing skills".

Before her death in October 2026, Hornaday had completed a book about the production of All the President's Men (1976). She had called the film a metonym for the Watergate scandal, which "from the moment it opened seemed to fuse seamlessly with private memory and collective myth". The book is tentatively scheduled to be released in 2028.

== Personal life and death ==
Hornaday lived in Baltimore. She married Dennis Greenia in 2000, and they had one daughter together and another daughter from a previous marriage. She called herself a "cradle Episcopalian", and served as a Sunday school teacher at her Baltimore parish for a "dozen years".

Hornaday died from glioblastoma at her home in Baltimore on October 18, 2026, at the age of 66.
