= Comparative contextual analysis =

Comparative contextual analysis is a methodology for comparative research where contextual interrogation precedes any analysis of similarity and difference. It is a thematic process directed and designed to explore relationships of agency rather than institutional or structural frameworks. See structure and agency and theory of structuration.
