= List of Sylvester McCoy performances =

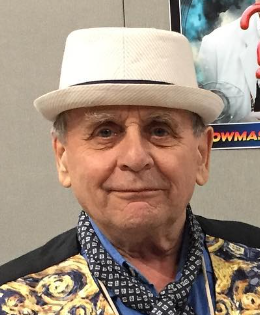
McCoy in 2019

Percy James Patrick Kent-Smith, known professionally as Sylvester McCoy, is a Scottish actor who has worked in the mediums of film, television, theatre, video games and audio drama. Below are a list of his performances.

== Film ==
Year	Title	Role	Notes	Ref.
1979	Dracula	Walter	As Sylveste McCoy	
1979	All the Fun of the Fair	Scotch Jack		
1979	The Secret Policeman's Ball	Sylvester McCoy		
1987	Three Kinds of Heat	Harry Pimm		
1995	Leapin' Leprechauns!	Flynn		
1996	Spellbreaker: Secret of the Leprechauns	Flynn		
1997	Beyond Fear	Michael Sams		
2000	The Mumbo Jumbo	Mr. Tallman		
2006	The Battersea Ripper	Duncan		
2008	King Lear	The Fool		
2009	The Academy	Felix		
2009	The Academy Part 2: First Impressions	Felix		
2010	Punk Strut: The Movie	DJ		
2012	Eldorado	General Zwick		
2012	The Hobbit: An Unexpected Journey	Radagast		
2013	The Christmas Candle	Edward Haddington		
2013	The Hobbit: The Desolation of Smaug	Radagast		
2013	Quest: A Tall Tale	Ardan	Voice	
2014	The Seventeenth Kind	Rusty		
2014	The Hobbit: The Battle of the Five Armies	Radagast		
2017	Slumber	Amado		
2020	You	Vasilij Grossman		
2020	The Owners	Dr. Richard Huggins		
2020	Lost at Christmas	Ernie		
2022	The Munsters	Igor		
2025	Dead Before They Wake	Evan		

== Television ==
Year	Title	Role	Notes
1973–1976	Vision On	Various	
1973	Roberts Robots	Robot Entertainer	Episode: "Dial C for Chaos"
1975	Lucky Feller	Sylveste	Pilot episode
1977	For the Love of Albert	Cast Member	Unknown episodes
1978	Leapfrog	Bert	All 28 episodes
1979	Jigsaw	O-Man	
1979	Turning Year Tales	Turps	Episode: "Big Jim and the Figaro Club"
1979	Jackanory	Reader	Episode: "Charlie and the Chocolate Factory"
1979	The Secret Policeman's Ball	Himself	
1980	BBC2 Playhouse	Kerwin	Episode: "Electric in the City"
1981	Big Jim and the Figaro Club	Turps	5 episodes
1981	Tiny Revolutions	Cabaret comedian	TV movie
1981	Tiswas	Various	
1982–1986	Eureka	Various	All 32 episodes
1984	Starstrider	Wart	
1985	The Last Place on Earth	Lt. 'Birdie' Bowers	6 episodes
1985	No 73	Moving man	Episode: "Moving Space"
1985	Dramarama	Donald	Episode: "Frog"
1987–1989, 2022	Doctor Who	Seventh Doctor	44 episodes
1988	What's Your Story?	Narrator / Presenter	
1988	Tomorrow's World	Himself	Christmas special
1989	The Noel Edmonds Saturday Roadshow	Seventh Doctor	
1990	Search Out Science	Seventh Doctor	Episode "Search Out Space"
1991	Thrill Kill Video Club	Spoons	Video
1993	Jackanory	Storyteller	2 episodes
1993	Dimensions in Time	Seventh Doctor	Children in Need special
1994	Frank Stubbs	Angus	Episode: "Mr. Chairman"
1996	Rab C. Nesbitt	Gash Senior	Episode: "Father"
1996	Doctor Who	Seventh Doctor	TV movie
1997	The History of Tom Jones: A Foundling	Mr. Dowling	4 episodes
1999, 2001	See It Saw It	Jester	1 episode
1999, 2001	See It Saw It	The Lord High Chamberlain / Aunt Grizelda	Episode: "Courage and Adventure"
2001	Casualty	Kev the Rev	Episode: "Life and Soul"
2002	Hollyoaks	Leonard Cave	1 episode
2002	The Bill	Ian Drew	Episode: "010"
2004	Still Game	Archie	Episode: "Oot"
2006	The Bill	Morris Shaw	Episode: "457"
2006	Mayo	Reverend Beaver	Episode: "Late of This Parish"
2008	Great Performances	The Fool	Episode: "King Lear"
2008	Casualty	Ashley Millington	Episode: "The Evil That Men Do"
2008	Doctors	Graham Capelli	Episode: "The Lollipop Man"
2009	Al Murray's Multiple Personality Disorder	Nazi Doctor	1 episode
2013	The Five(ish) Doctors Reboot	Himself	TV film
2015	Crims	Mr. Dunlop	Episode: "Day Thirty-Six"
2017–2018	Sense8	The Old Man of Hoy	4 episodes
2017–2018	Zapped	Lord Protector	3 episodes
2017	Sarah & Duck	Comet	Episode: "Comet's Coming"
2018	Holby City	Clive Brooker	Episode: "All Lies Lead to the Truth"
2019	Thunderbirds Are Go	Aezethril the Wizard	Episode: "Endgame"
2023	Tales of the TARDIS	Seventh Doctor	Episode: "The Curse of Fenric"
2024	Father Brown	Dr. Angus McClurgy	Episode: "The Hermit of Hazelnut Cottage"
2026	2026 Commonwealth Games opening ceremony	Seventh Doctor	Cameo

== Stage ==
Year	Title	Role	Notes
1975	An Italian Straw Hat	Fadinard	Theatre Royal, Stratford East
1975	Bloody Mary		Theatre Royal, Stratford East
1976	Bartholomew Fair	Ezechiel Edgworth / Puppet operator	Nottingham Playhouse
1977-8	White Suit Blues	Angel / Ben Rogers / Mark Twain / Pallbearer / Prisoner / Robot	The Old Vic and Nottingham Playhouse
1980	Gone With Hardy	Stan Laurel	Nottingham Playhouse
1980-1	Robin Hood	Mrs Campbell	Theatre Royal, Stratford East
1981	Can't Pay? Won't Pay!	Sergeant/Inspector/Undertaker/Grandfather	Criterion Theatre
1982-3	The Pirates of Penzance	Samuel	Theatre Royal
1983	The Ghost Train		Lyric Theatre
1983	Abracadabra		Lyric Theatre
1985-6	Bedtime Story		Bristol Old Vic
1986	Dracula, or Out For The Count		Lyric Theatre
1986	Antony and Cleopatra		Theatre Royal
1986	The Taming of the Shrew		Theatre Royal
1986	The Pied Piper	The Pied Piper	National Theatre – Olivier, National Theatre and Camera Theater Tel Aviv
1987	The Pied Piper	The Pied Piper	National Theatre – Lyttelton, National Theatre
1988	Love Songs of World War III: The Adrian Mitchell Songbook	Company	National Theatre – Cottesloe Theatre (now National Theatre – Dorfman), National Theatre
1989-90	Aladdin		Palace Theatre
1990	Temptation	Fistula	Westminster Theatre
1991	The Marriage of Figaro	Count Almaviva	Watford Palace Theatre
1992-3	Cinderella		Theatre Royal, Bath
1995	Zorro The Musical!	Bernardo	Theatre Royal
1998	Life is a Dream	Clarin	Royal Lyceum Theatre
1999	Life is a Dream	Clarin	Barbican Theatre
2001-2	The Lion, the Witch and the Wardrobe	Mr. Beaver	Sadler's Wells Theatre
2003	Noises Off	Selsdon Mowbray	Grand Theatre & Opera House, Leeds, Birmingham Repertory Theatre, and other locations
2005	Arsenic and Old Lace	Dr Einstein	Mercury Theatre and Richmond Theatre
2005	Aladdin	Abanazar	Yvonne Arnaud Theatre
2007-8	King Lear	Lear's Fool	Courtyard Theatre, Theatre Royal and other locations

Year	Title	Role	Company	Director |	Notes
2014	Three Sisters	Dr. McGillivrey	Tron Theatre, Glasgow	Andy Arnold	adaptation by John Byrne
2022	Apartness	Christopher	K4K Films and Shortcut Productions		

== Short films ==
Year	Title	Role	Notes	Ref.
2002	The Shieling of the One Night	Fergus		
2004	Griffin	Grim	Spanish short film	
2008	Pass Them On	The Administrator		
2015	The Last Conjuror	Arthur Roberts		
2016	Tale of a Timelord	The Doctor		
2018	Beauty	Henry		
2021	24 Carat	Seventh Doctor		
2026	Bananacide	Dr. Brunswick		

== Direct to video ==
Year	Title	Role	Notes	Ref.
1991	The Hartnell Years	Presenter		
1993	The Airzone Solution	Anthony Stanwick		
1994	The Zero Imperative	Dr. Colin Dove		
1996	Bidding Adieu	Himself	Documentary	
2001	Do You Have a License To Save This Planet?	'The Foot Doctor'	Short film	

== Video games ==
Year	Title	Voice role	Notes	Refs.
1997	Destiny of the Doctors	Seventh Doctor		
2015	Lego Dimensions	Seventh Doctor	Archive voice	
2024	Fallout: London	Mysterious Scientist 1	Guest role	
2026	Forest of Deceit	Narrator		

== Audio drama ==
Year	Title	Role	Notes
1995	Prince Caspian	Reepicheep	BBC Radio 4 Dramatisation
1995	The Voyage of the Dawn Treader	Reepicheep	BBC Radio 4 Dramatisation
1997	The Last Battle	Reepicheep	BBC Radio 4 Dramatisation
1998–2000	The Time Travellers	The Professor	BBV Productions
1999–2021	Doctor Who: The Monthly Adventures	Seventh Doctor	93 stories
2001	Doctor Who: Death Comes To Time	Seventh Doctor	5-part webcast
2007, 2012–2015	Bernice Summerfield	Seventh Doctor	9 stories
2011	Doctor Who: The Lost Stories	Seventh Doctor	4 stories
2011-2013	The Minister of Chance	The Witch Prime	5 stories
2012	Doctor Who: The Companion Chronicles	Seventh Doctor	Story: "Project Nirvana"
2012-2016	Doctor Who: The Novel Adaptations	Seventh Doctor	8 stories
2015	The Extraordinary Adventures of G.A. Henty: The Dragon And The Raven	Cedric the Shipwright	
2016	The Diary of River Song	Seventh Doctor	2 stories
2018–present	The Seventh Doctor Adventures	Seventh Doctor	11 stories

== Web ==
Year	Title	Role	Notes	Ref.
2020	The Doctors Say Thank You	Himself		

== Pinball ==
Year	Title	Role
1992	Doctor Who	The Doctor
