= SMarteenies =

British children's television programme

- Presented by: Kirsten O'Brien; Mark Speight; Jay Burridge; Lizi Botham
- Starring: Marcus Clarke (as Doogy the Dog)
- Country of origin: United Kingdom
- Original language: English
- No. of episodes: 50

Production
- Executive producer: Chris Bellinger
- Producer: Chris Tandy
- Running time: 15 minutes
- Production company: BBC

Original release
- Network: CBeebies
- Release: February 11, 2002 – 2003

Related
- SMart; SMart on the Road; SMart Hart

SMarteenies is a children's art programme produced by BBC's in-house children's division aimed at pre-school audiences. It was a spin-off of the CBBC programme SMart, and aired on CBeebies.

== About ==
The series was presented by the four then-current presenters from the original SMart - Jay Burridge, Lizi Botham (referred to as "Bizi Lizi"), Kirsten O'Brien and Mark Speight. Each presenter had a corresponding colour, represented through a coloured T-shirt with the show's logo on it - Blue for Jay, Yellow for Lizi, Sky for Kirsten and Red for Mark. Each of the presenters hosted two different segments, which alternated every other episode.

The programme started with the four presenters standing in a row determining who was to do the first piece (with the rhyme: "Eeny, meeny, miny, moe, SMarteenies guess who'll have a go"), with the large CGI paintbrush from the show's logo flying above their heads like a rocket choosing the presenter and they would transition over to the segment. Following each piece, the programme returned to this screen to select the next presenter.

=== Odd-Numbered Episodes ===
- Man of Letters - Hosted by Jay, he wore a postman's cap and carried a messenger bag covered with alphabet letters. The bag contains items and artistic tools starting with a particular letter of the alphabet which he then uses to produce a piece of art.
- Fingerprint Art - Hosted by Lizi, she uses her fingerprints to create pictures on a screen in front of the camera and uses a black marker to detail images. This segment appeared three times in between the other segments and contains no dialogue aside from Lizi mentioning what the picture is when completed.
- Doogy - Hosted by Kirsten, she and puppet Doogy the Dog (played by Marcus Clarke) produce various works of art in this sitcom-like segment. Doogy normally goes out in his little blue car called the "Doogymobile" to get things for Kirsten.
- Shape Store - Hosted by Mark, he would make different pictures out of different shapes, beginning with the catchphrase “Ready steady shapes”. Mark wears a brown jacket in addition to his red T-shirt in this segment.

=== Even-Numbered Episodes ===
- Ways to Make Pictures - Hosted by Jay, he would demonstrate effective methods to make pictures like coloured pencils, wax crayons and so on.
- School Visit - Hosted by Lizi, she would visit a preschool and produce artwork with children.
- Pattern Palace - Hosted by Kirsten, she would use different art media to create fun and colourful patterns.
- Small Picture, Big Picture - Hosted by Mark, he would simultaneously produce a normal-sized and large-scale version of the same scene (e.g. using mops instead of paint brushes for the large version). When he makes the big picture, he wears a hat or face accessory relevant to the picture he makes.

== Broadcast ==
The series ran on CBeebies from its launch in February 2002 until 2003, with reruns broadcasting until January 2008. The show was axed from CBeebies afterwards following the death of presenter Mark Speight's fiancée Natasha Collins and his subsequent suicide. Until its suspension, Speight and O'Brien were the only remaining presenters of the principal show SMart, as Burridge and Botham had left.

The series aired in Canada on CBC's Kids' CBC block, alongside BBC Kids. The series aired in Australia on the local version of CBeebies, and was the only channel that still broadcast the show, airing the series until 2017.

== Episodes ==
Season	Episodes	Originally released	
Season	Episodes	First released	Last released
1	50	2002	2002

No. overall	No. in series	Title	Directed by	Written by	Original release date
1	1	"Letter A"	N/A	N/A	February 2002
Jay: Jay, Man of Letters - What's the letter today? It's A. A is for art and artist. Bizi: Bizi creates a paintbrush and palette using paint and her fingertips. Later on, Lizi also creates a boy and a girl. Kirsten: Kirsten gives Mark and Jay crazy hair using cotton wool (with help from Doogy of course). Mark: Mark creates a dog using shapes from his shapes store.
2	2	"Lines"	N/A	N/A	2002
Jay: Jay makes a picture using pencils by not taking the pencil off the paper. Bizi: Bizi and the children create lots of different pictures using lines. Kirsten: Pattern Palace with Kirsten - using thin lines and fat lines to create a pattern. Mark: Mark creates a pictures of a Clown in Small Picture, Big Picture.
3	3	"Letter B"	N/A	N/A	2002
Jay: Jay, Man of Letters - What's the letter today? It's B. B is for Brushes. Bizi: Bizi creates a colourful bird using paint and her fingertips. Later on, Lizi also creates jumping frogs and bees. Kirsten: Kirsten makes a duck out of a paper plate and feathers (with help from Doogy of course). Mark: Mark creates flowers using shapes from his shape store.
4	4	"Patterns"	N/A	N/A	2002
Jay: Jay makes a picture using felt tip pens and creates colourful patterned fish. Bizi: Bizi and the children create imagination pictures. Kirsten: Pattern Palace with Kirsten - using magic pens to create technicoloured patterns. Mark: Mark creates a pictures of a Castle Tower in Small Picture, Big Picture.
5	5	"Letter C"	N/A	N/A	2002
Jay: Jay, Man of Letters - What's the letter today? It's C. C is for collage. Bizi: Bizi creates a palm tree using paint and her fingertips. Later on, Lizi also creates two spiders. Kirsten: Kirsten makes a snake out of toilet roll tubes and tissue (with help from Doogy of course). Mark: Mark creates a lion using shapes from his shape store.
6	6	"Making Pictures with Black and White Pencils"	N/A	N/A	2002
Jay: Jay makes a picture of a cow and a zebra using black and white pencils. Bizi: Bizi and the children draw shadows. Kirsten: Pattern Palace with Kirsten - beaker. Mark: Mark creates pictures of a Penguin in Small Picture, Big Picture.
7	7	"Letter D"	N/A	N/A	2002
Jay: Jay, Man of Letters - What's the letter today? It's D. D is for dots. Bizi: Bizi creates ladybirds using paint and her fingertips. Later on, Lizi also creates a boy with balloons. Kirsten: Kirsten makes pictures out of stones (with help from Doogy of course). Mark: Mark creates a snow picture using shapes from his shapes store.
8	8	"Making Pictures with Coloured Pencils"	N/A	N/A	2002
Jay: Jay shows us the contrast of light to hard shading using coloured pencils. Bizi: Bizi and the children make colourful shapes using sponges. Kirsten: Pattern Palace with Kirsten - perfect pattern using lots of coloured tissue paper. Mark: Mark creates pictures of a Sunset in Small Picture, Big Picture.
9	9	"Letter E"	N/A	N/A	2002
Jay: Jay, Man of Letters - What's the letter today? It's E. E is for eraser. Lizi: Lizi creates a steam train using paint and her fingertips. Later on, Lizi also creates footprints. Kirsten: Kirsten makes mode of transport pictures out of salt (with help from Doogy of course). Mark: Mark creates a racing car using shapes from his shape store.
10	10	"Making Pictures with Wax Crayons"	N/A	N/A	2002
Jay: Jay shows us how to make a beach scene using wax crayons. Bizi: Bizi and the children make magic crayon pictures. Kirsten: Pattern Palace with Kirsten - identical patterns using coloured lines. Mark: Mark creates pictures of Jet Planes in Small Picture, Big Picture.
11	11	"Letter F"	N/A	N/A	2002
Jay: Jay, Man of Letters - What's the letter today? It's F. F is for fabric. Lizi: Lizi creates a flag on top of a castle using paint and her fingertips. Later on, Lizi also creates a rainbow and a footballer. Kirsten: Kirsten makes a sunny day kite picture out of clothes and fabrics (with help from Doogy of course). Mark: Mark creates hats using shapes from his shape store.
12	12	"Making Pictures with Chalk"	N/A	N/A	2002
Jay: Jay shows us how to make fireworks and rockets using chalk. Lizi: Lizi and the children make chalk pictures of the weather as well as a fluffy cloud using cotton wool. Kirsten: Pattern Palace with Kirsten - ways to make the perfect snowflake. Mark: Mark creates pictures of a Snowman in Small Picture, Big Picture.
13	13	"Letter G"	N/A	N/A	2002
Jay: Jay, Man of Letters - What's the letter today? It's G. G is for glitter. Lizi: Lizi creates the moon and the stars using paint and her fingertips as well as a space rocket. Later on, Lizi also creates the sun in the sky. Kirsten: Kirsten makes glittery crescent moon and star hanging decorations using foil (with help from Doogy of course). Mark: Mark makes a kite using shapes from his shape store.
14	14	"Making Pictures with Brushes and Paint"	N/A	N/A	2002
Jay: Jay shows us how to paint flowers, wheat and leaves with different sized brushes. Lizi: Lizi and the children make pictures with different sorts of brushes. Kirsten: Pattern Palace with Kirsten - painting with sponges and making patterns with a comb. Mark: Mark creates pictures of two hedgehogs in Small Picture, Big Picture.
15	15	"Letter H"	N/A	N/A	2002
Jay: Jay, Man of Letters - What's the letter today? It's H. H is hands. Lizi: Lizi creates a turkey using paint and her fingertips as well as a torch. Later on, Lizi also creates a block of flats. Kisten: Kirsten makes a shadow picture out of objects (with help from Doogy of course). Mark: Mark makes a night time picture using shapes from his shape store.
16	16	"Making Pictures with Wet Paper and Watercolour Paints"	N/A	N/A	2002
Jay: Jay shows us how to paint underwater creatures using wet paper and watercolour paints. Lizi: Lizi and the children make pictures by mixing paints and creating fishy paintings. Kisten: Pattern Palace with Kirsten - creating a spinning spiral pattern using paints and a paper plate. Mark: Mark creates pictures of a tree in Small Picture, Big Picture.
17	17	"Letter I"	N/A	N/A	2002
Jay: Jay, Man of Letters - What's the letter today? It is for Imagination. Lizi: Lizi creates thunder and lightning using paint and her fingertips as well as a dinosaur. Later on, Lizi also creates a wigwam and a scar. Kirsten: Kirsten makes a monster sculpture out of brown paper bags, pom pom eyes and pipe-cleaners (with help from Doogy of course). Mark: Mark makes a campsite using shapes from his shape store.
18	18	"Mixing Coloured Paints to Make Pictures"	N/A	N/A	2002
Jay: Jay shows us how to paint with any colour by mixing the primary colours to make green, orange and purple. As well as this, Jay shows us how to make the colours (in this instance, orange) lighter or darker by adding more red or yellow. Lizi: Lizi and the children make pictures by mixing paints and creating handprints. Kirsten: Pattern Palace with Kirsten - creating patterned prints using paint and soles of shoes. Mark: Mark creates pictures of a dinosaur in Small Picture, Big Picture.
19	19	"Letter J"	N/A	N/A	2002
Jay: Jay, Man of Letters - What's the letter today? It's J. J is for Jigsaw. Lizi: Lizi creates a caterpillar using paint and her fingertips as well as a Teddy Bear. Later on, Lizi also creates a train and carriages. Kirsten: Kirsten makes a storybook using photographs (with help from Doogy of course). Mark: Mark makes a snake using shapes from his shape store.
20	20	"Making Pictures Using Lots of Colours"	N/A	N/A	2002
Jay: Jay shows us how to mix the primary colours to make green, orange and purple. He also uses white paint to make the colours lighter / create pink, lemon yellow and sky blue. Lizi: Lizi and the children focus on making self portraits using paints, paper plates and materials. Kirsten: Pattern Palace with Kirsten - creating patterned prints using lots of different colours of paint with newspaper/foil acting like paintbrushes. Mark: Mark creates pictures of a fish in Small Picture, Big Picture.
21	21	"Letter K"	N/A	N/A	2002
Jay: Jay, Man of Letters - What's the letter today? It's K. K is for Kaleidoscope. Lizi: Lizi creates two flying kites using paint and her fingertips as well as three butterflies. Later on, Lizi also creates a castle. Kristen: Kirsten makes a stained glass picture (with help from Doogy of course). Mark: Mark makes a castle using shapes from his shape store.
22	22	"Making Pictures with Collage Pieces"	N/A	N/A	2002
Jay: Jay shows us how to make a newspaper butterfly collage using a variety of coloured scraps from magazines. Lizi: Lizi and the children have been busy collecting colours to make pictures. They make tree and flower collages. Kristen: Pattern Palace with Kirsten - creating a pattern collage with pieces of wrapping paper and materials (a new pattern from lots of old patterns). Mark: Mark creates a picture of a hot air balloon in Small Picture, Big Picture.
23	23	"Letter L"	N/A	N/A	2002
Jay: - What's the letter today? It's L. L is for Line. Lizi: Lizi creates a washing line using paint and her fingertips as well as a person walking upstairs. Later on, Lizi also creates two snails. Kirsten: Kirsten makes a weaving pattern using clothes on the drying rack (with help from Doogy of course). Mark: Mark makes a maze using shapes from his shape store.
24	24	"Making Glitter Pictures"	N/A	N/A	2002
Jay: - Jay shows us how to make colourful tissue paper pictures. Lizi: Lizi and the children have been busy making glitter pictures using glue and glitter. They make various patterns. Kirsten: Kirsten creating a bubble pattern using a tray full of paint, water and washing up liquid. Mark: Mark creates a picture of fireworks using glitter in Small Picture, Big Picture.
25	25	"Letter M"	N/A	N/A	2002
Jay: - What's the letter today? It's M. M is for Mess. Lizi: Lizi creates a flower using paint and her fingertips as well as five pigs. Later on, Lizi also created two cats. Kirsten: Kirsten makes a dog pattern using dog biscuits and paint (with help from Doogy of course). Mark: Mark makes a rabbit using shapes from his shapes store.
26	26	"Making Pictures with Coloured Pencils and Felt Tip Pens"	N/A	N/A	2002
Jay: - Jay shows us how to draw food pictures using coloured pencils and felt tip pens. Lizi: Lizi and the children have been busy decorating bowls. They make various patterns. Kirsten: Pattern Palace with Kirsten - creating printed patterns using string, paint and elastic bands. Mark: Mark creates a picture of Doogy the dog in Small Picture, Big Picture.
27	27	"Letter N"	N/A	N/A	2002
Jay: - Man of Letters - What's the letter today? It's N. N is for Newspaper. Lizi: Lizi creates someone skipping using paint and her fingertips as well as traffic lights. Later on, Lizi also creates a monster. Kirsten: Kirsten makes a colourful picture using string and paint (with help from Doogy of course). Mark: Mark makes a monster using shapes from his shape store.
28	28	"Making Pictures with Bits and Bobs"	N/A	N/A	2002
Jay: - Jay shows us how to make a seaside picture using bits and pieces (felt, foam & scraps) he's saved. Lizi: Lizi and the children have been busy making pictures look rough and smooth using different materials. They make a beach picture. Kirsten: Pattern Palace with Kirsten - creating printed, textured patterns using foil and a pen. Mark: Mark creates a picture of a spider using plastercine in Small Picture, Big Picture.
29	29	"Letter O"	N/A	N/A	2002
30	30	"N/A"	N/A	N/A	2002
31	31	"Letter P"	N/A	N/A	2002
32	32	"N/A"	N/A	N/A	2002
33	33	"Letter Q"	N/A	N/A	2002
34	34	"N/A"	N/A	N/A	2002
35	35	"Letters R & S"	N/A	N/A	2002
36	36	"N/A"	N/A	N/A	2002
37	37	"Letter T"	N/A	N/A	2002
38	38	"N/A"	N/A	N/A	2002
39	39	"Letter U"	N/A	N/A	2002
40	40	"N/A"	N/A	N/A	2002
41	41	"Letter V"	N/A	N/A	2002
42	42	"N/A"	N/A	N/A	2002
43	43	"Letter W"	N/A	N/A	2002
44	44	"N/A"	N/A	N/A	2002
45	45	"Letter X"	N/A	N/A	2002
46	46	"N/A"	N/A	N/A	2002
47	47	"Letter Y"	N/A	N/A	2002
48	48	"N/A"	N/A	N/A	2002
49	49	"Letter Z"	N/A	N/A	2002
Jay: Jay, Man of Letters - What's the letter today? It's Z. Z is for zig-zags. Bizi: Bizi creates a sleeping using paint and her fingertips. Later on, Lizi also creates daffodil and a crocodile. Kirsten: Kirsten makes a flower using a vase (with help from Doogy of course). Mark: Mark creates a dinosaur using shapes from his shapes store.
50	50	"N/A"	N/A	N/A	2002
