= Jay Burridge =

British artist and TV presenter

- Born: 12 January 1971 (age 55); London, England
- Occupations: Presenter, artist
- Years active: 1994–present
- Known for: Presenting SMart (1994–2003)

Jay Jay Burridge also known as Jay Burridge (born 12 January 1971) is a British artist and former television presenter. He fronted the BBC children's art programme SMart from 1994 until 2003, when he left and became a graphic designer and snowboard inventor. He was a close friend of colleague Mark Speight.

== Career ==
=== TV presenter and early career ===
He graduated from Central Saint Martins College of Art and Design with a degree in art, and, in 1994, auditioned for the role as a presenter on the BBC children's art programme SMart. At his interview, he met Mark Speight, and the two soon formed a strong friendship. Burridge and Speight were given the jobs of presenting SMart alongside Zoe Ball. Ball left, and was replaced by Josie d'Arby who was then replaced by Kirsten O'Brien and Lizi Botham in 1999. Together with O'Brien and Botham they fronted the SMart spin-off shows SMart on the Road and SMarteenies, as well as appearing at many other art-related events.

Together, Burridge and Speight created all of the art projects for each episode of SMart at Burridge's West London art studio. He noted: "We would bounce ideas and jokes off each other all day until we had developed an almost telepathically linked knowledge of what made each other laugh."

Burridge left SMart in 2003, feeling he had "outgrown [his] role as a children's TV presenter," and wanted to move "out of the limelight". He worked as a commercial artist before becoming a producer for a TV company, as well as working as a graphic designer and snowboard inventor. He is the founder of the design company Laughing Boy and Lucky Seven, a hat company which specialises in crested baseball caps emblazoned with the logos of fictional companies from TV shows and films. The caps have been worn by people including Madonna and David LaChapelle.

Burridge directed the music video for the song "Inspired By" by The Brightlights and was art director on Hot Chip's "Boy from School" video, for which he won a Cads Music Vision Award. He also designed several large denim butterflies, which went on display on the streets of London, as part of an advertising campaign for Levi Strauss & Co.'s "Live Unbuttoned" 501 jeans. When Superstars Ruled the World, an exhibition by Burridge about dinosaurs, opened in 2010 at the Lazarides Gallery in Beverly Hills. In 2011, Burridge's piece, a full-sized unassembled airfix model of Ayrton Senna's McLaren MP4/6 Formula One car, sold at auction for €187,000. The piece had been on show at the "Remembering Ayrton Senna" exhibition.

=== Supersaurs ===
In 2017, Bonnier Zaffre released The World of Supersaurs: Raptors of Paradise, the first of a major six-book series, written by Burridge. The book was accompanied by a free app that uses AR technology to bring the illustrations to life and also had a mini-game with 50 missions that are completed by exploring the pages. Burridge, who is dyslexic, wrote and designed the book experience to instigate children that struggle with reading to be excited about books and is a firm believer on the use of technology to support new readers.

== Personal life ==
Burridge moved from London to the Cotswolds in 2009, where he lives with his wife and two sons. The property is part of the Cornbury Park estate and features a large triceratops statue created by Burridge. Burridge was close friends with Mark Speight; The two formed an "on- and off-screen double act" and regularly attended the Regency Rooms comedy nights together. Following the death of Speight's fiancée Natasha Collins in January 2008, Burridge met up with him on several occasions and "tried to get him to see that the worst was over", although he realised that Speight "might not be able to keep going". Burridge spoke to Speight on 7 April 2008 and arranged to meet up with him later in the day. Speight, however, disappeared and died by suicide later that day. Burridge had helped police try to locate Speight, and was informed of his death on 13 April. He attended Speight's funeral on 28 April.
