= Samuel Victor Perry =

England international rugby union player & biochemist

Samuel Victor Perry FRS
- Born: 16 July 1918; Isle of Wight, England
- Died: 17 December 2009 (aged 91); Pembrokeshire, Wales
- Education: University of Liverpool, University of Cambridge
- Known for: Myosin light chain phosphorylation
- Spouse: Maureen Shaw
- Children: Three
- Scientific career
- Fields: Muscle biochemistry
- Workplaces: University of Cambridge, University of Birmingham

Samuel Victor Perry FRS (16 July 1918 – 17 December 2009) was an English biochemist who was a pioneer in the field of muscle biochemistry. In his earlier years he was a rugby union lock who played club rugby for Southport R.F.C., Cambridge University R.U.F.C. and international rugby for England.

Perry's later career saw him serve on several of the British research councils, and working with the charities the British Heart Foundation and the Muscular Dystrophy Campaign. He was made a Fellow of the Royal Society in 1974.

== Early life and education ==
Samuel Perry was born on the Isle of Wight in 1918, and spent his early years in King's Lynn. His family moved to Southport, where he received his secondary education at the town's grammar school, King George V School. His father died of a heart condition when Perry was 13, and his mother struggled to financially support his university education.

After schooling in Southport Perry gained entry to the University of Liverpool where he studied biochemistry; at the time one of only three universities in Britain which offered undergraduate courses in the field. At Liverpool he met future Nobel Prize winner, Rodney Porter and the two struck up a lifelong friendship. Both men graduated in 1939; their postgraduate ambitions were halted by the outbreak of the Second World War. His academic career was then interrupted by war service in the Royal Artillery, though he spent much of the Second World War in Italian and German prisoner-of-war camps after being captured during the Western Desert Campaign. After his liberation and demobilisation, he undertook doctoral studies at the University of Cambridge. This was followed by a period of post-doctoral study in the United States, before returning to Cambridge as a lecturer. In 1959 he moved to the University of Birmingham as head of its new biochemistry department, created under Perry's leadership by the merging in 1968 of the relatively small Department of Biochemistry associated with a brewing school (founded in 1899 with Adrian John Brown, pioneer in enzyme catalysis, as Professor of Brewing Malting) with the Departments of Medical Biochemistry and Physiological Chemistry.

== Military career ==
Perry joined the British Army and was offered the choice of a position working on chemical warfare or joining the Royal Artillery. He chose artillery, and was commissioned as a second lieutenant on 5 July 1941. He was posted to Egypt where he arrived in August 1941. Perry's frontline experience in the army was short, as he was captured early in 1942 when his unit was overrun by Rommel's forces as they attempted to slow the German advance from Benghazi. Perry spent the next three and a half years in various German prisoner-of-war camps, initially in Italy; after the confusion brought by the Italian Armistice, he made his first escape attempt. Breaking through a German cordon he tried to hide his escape by crawling through a wheat field, but was quickly recaptured. Over the next few days he and his fellow prisoners were transported by rail farther north towards German camps. Perry jumped off the moving train at Mantua and made his way on foot to the north of the town. As he approached a bridge, he was recognised by a German guard who had recaptured him only five days earlier in Perry's first escape attempt. Perry was escorted to a commandeered villa in the town and locked in a bathroom until he was able to be transferred again. He spent time in camps in Germany and Silesia before the Russian advance forced his movement west to Brunswick. On the journey he made his third and final escape bid. He and a fellow prisoner cut their way out of a cattle truck and leapt from the moving train. Again he was recaptured, this time by a German patrol. He was then taken to appear before a military court in Hildesheim, where he was court-martialed for damaging a German train, and placed in solitary confinement for a month.

Despite his numerous failed escape attempts, Perry managed never to lose a copy of Annual Review of Biochemistry of 1942, volume 11, sent to him through the aid of the Red Cross. He lectured within the prison camps, and ran courses on biochemistry and agricultural chemistry. He was eventually liberated by the United States Army, and on his return to Britain was discharged from the army.

== Biochemistry career ==
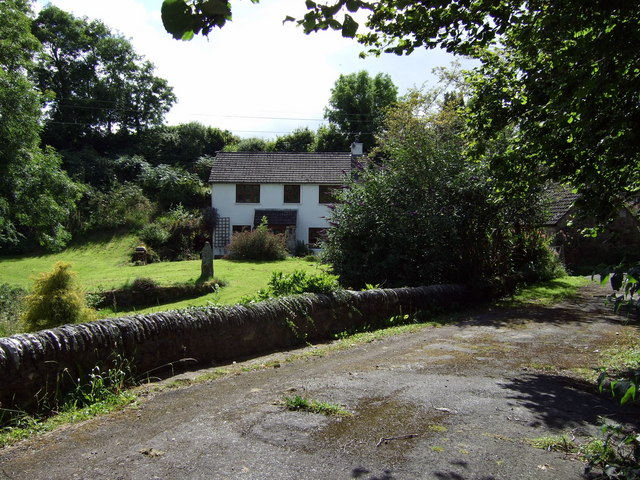
Felin Werndew, Perry's retirement cottage in Pembrokeshire

Back in Britain, Perry took a post at the University of Cambridge to complete his PhD. At Cambridge he studied under Kenneth Bailey, and shared a laboratory with his old friend Porter and Fred Sanger. In Cambridge, Perry developed a reputation as a major figure in muscle research and won the Trinity College prize fellowship for his pioneering doctoral thesis. He took up a lecturing post in Cambridge and in 1948, while still at the university, he married Maureen Shaw, an artist and actress he met in Southport.

He took a post at the University of Birmingham in 1959, and later served on the research committees of the Science Research Council the Medical Research Council, Agricultural Research Council and the British Heart Foundation. He was also spent twenty years associated with the British research charity the Muscular Dystrophy Campaign.

In 1959, just before his move to Birmingham, he purchased Felin-Werndew a ruined 18th century cornmill in Dinas Cross, Pembrokeshire in Wales. This became a massive project, and required major conversions and landscaping. During the 1960s he persuaded his students to help improve his home and its gardens as part of their "PhD research". After his retirement, he and wife Maureen moved permanently to the mill in Wales.

In March 1974, he was made a Fellow of the Royal Society, and contributed more than 300 scientific papers throughout his career. In 1984 he gave the Croonian Lecture on Calcium and the regulation of contractile activity.

== Academic research ==
After spending his postdoctoral period in America, Perry returned to Cambridge. Using his expertise in manipulating muscle tissue combined with his biochemical knowledge, he was able to isolate myofibril in an uncontracted state, and from that he was able to characterize their protein components. Further observation of the myofibrils, and the crude preparations of the extracted contractile protein actins and myosins taken from them, showed that they required trace levels of calcium for contractile activity. Perry then used the calcium chelator EGTA to confirm that calcium was essential for the regulation of muscle contraction. This was a major breakthrough in the understanding of how muscle contractions are regulated. Seven years later Setsuro Ebashi, identified the factor responsible for calcium sensitivity in muscles, which he called troponin.

Perry furthered his research by isolating the 'head' fragment of myosin by fractionating the myosin and its proteolytic fragments. He called this fragment subfragment-1. This research established Perry as one of the leading figures in the muscle field, and in 1959 he was invited to head a new Biochemistry department at Birmingham University. In Birmingham he and his team focused on the calcium regulatory troponin complex in skeletal muscle. They were able to isolate and then characterize the troponin, troponin I. This in turn led to the development of antibodies for muscle tissue typing which led to improved method of detecting heart muscle damage.

Perry continued his research at Birmingham, and spent considerable research on myosin light chain phosphorylation. Although he and his team were unable to establish the precise function of regulatory light chains in vertebrate skeletal and cardiac myosins, it laid the foundation for a whole new field of regulation of how phosphorylation regulates movement in smooth muscle and in non-muscle cells.

== Rugby career ==
Perry began his Rugby career at KGV in Southport before playing for Southport RFC from 1937 till 1940, the Second World War meant rugby ceased until 1945.

While a student at the University of Cambridge, Perry joined the university rugby union team. He played in two Varsity Matches in 1946 and 1947, and impressed enough to draw the attention of the RFU board of selectors. He was first capped for his country for the 1947 Five Nations Championship, in a match against Wales, the first match for England since 1939. Due to the passage of time between the start of the war and recommencement of games, only Dick Guest of England had any prior international experience. Despite Perry appearing in a completely uncapped pack, the forwards played brilliantly and an unfancied England won 9–6. Perry played in one more match of the 1947 tournament, an away game to Ireland, which England lost comprehensively.

Perry was next selected in early 1948 to face the touring Australia team. England lost the game 11–0, with the opposing locks dominating the line-out play. Although Perry had faced defeat with England, four weeks later he was selected to face the same Australian side as part of invitational team the Barbarians, in their first match against overseas international opposition. Played at the Cardiff Arms Park, the Barbarians won 9–6.

Despite the England loss to Australia, Perry was back in the squad for the 1948 Five Nations Championship, playing in all four encounters. It was a disaster of a campaign for England, drawing against Wales, and losing to Ireland, Scotland and France, and ending bottom of the league. Perry never represented his country further, deciding to concentrate on his academic career instead.

== Personal life ==
Perry married Maureen Shaw, an actress and artist, in 1948. In 1959 they purchased a derelict watermill in West Wales, and renovated it over several years. They settled at the watermill permanently after his retirement. The couple had three children.

He died on 17 December 2009, survived by his wife and three children.
