= Wilf Lunn =

English prop maker (1942–2023)

Wilf' Lunn
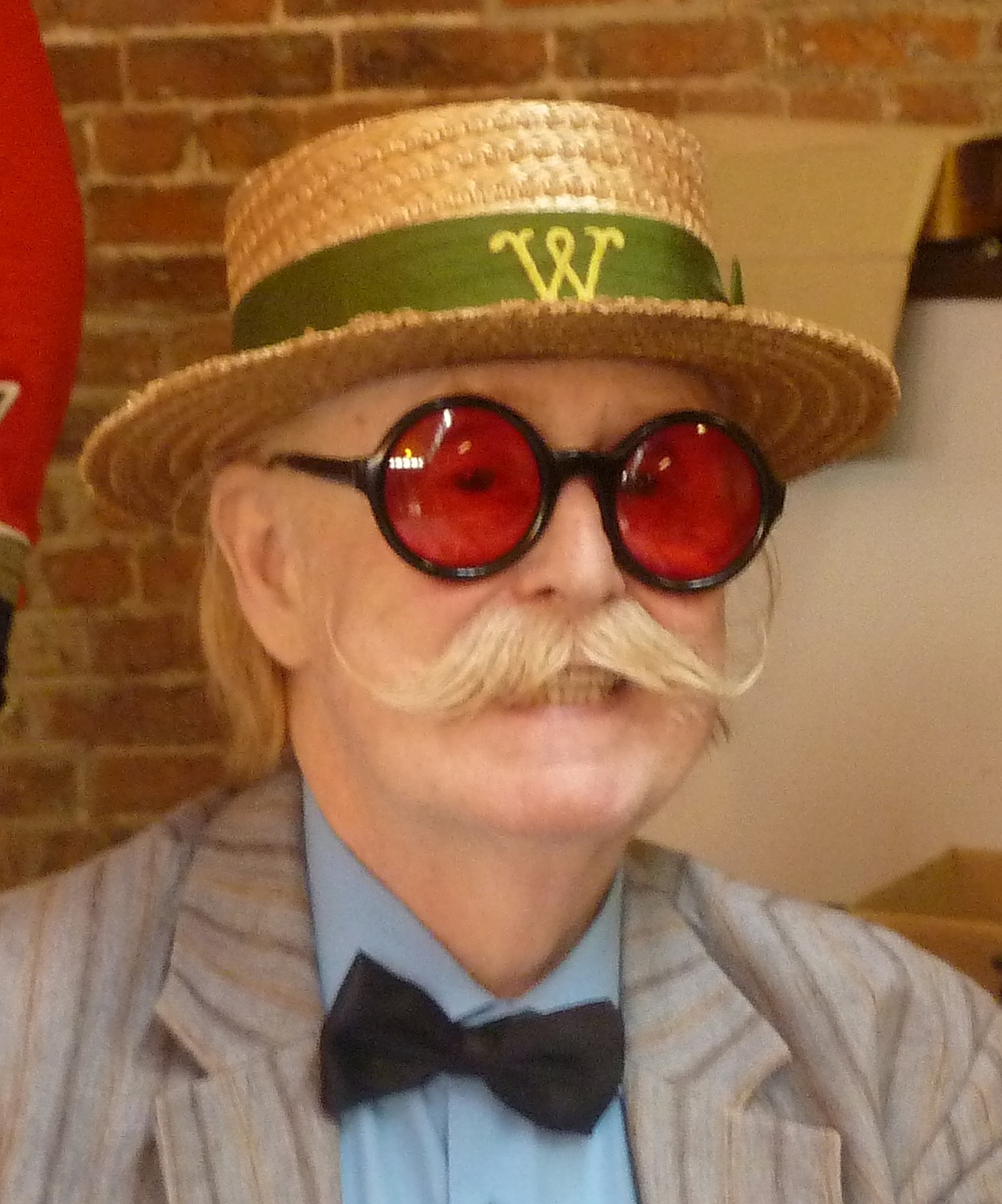
- Lunn in 2011
- Born: 20 March 1942; Rastrick, West Riding of Yorkshire, England
- Died: 13 December 2023 (aged 81)
- Years active: 1965–1995
- Wilf' Lunn's voice recorded in 2016
- Website: Official website

Wilfred Makepeace Lunn (20 March 1942 – 13 December 2023) was an English inventor, prop maker and television presenter. He is best known for his regular appearances on the 1960s and 1970s children's television show Vision On.

== Early life and career ==
Wilfred Makepeace Lunn was born in Rastrick, West Riding of Yorkshire, England on 20 March 1942 to deaf parents. He later taught lip-reading and religious education at Odsal House School for the Deaf in Odsal, Bradford. In the first part of this self-made interview video series "My Best Cellar", available through his website, Lunn claims he was "brought up in a cellar by deaf mutes".

The parents of actor James Mason lived nearby, leading to Lunn meeting Mason, who effected an introduction to the theatrical agent Blanche Marvin. An unsuccessful interview for Vision On was followed by an appearance on Joan Bakewell's Late Night Line-Up that night. This was Lunn's first television appearance. He subsequently appeared on the children's TV show Magpie, and on Vision On. He later appeared in several other series, including Jigsaw and Eureka.

Lunn built novelty bicycles and had a separate career as an inventor. He was an atheist, and teetotal.

Lunn died on 13 December 2023, at the age of 81.

== Television appearances ==
- Late Night Line-Up
- Magpie
- Vision On
- Eureka
- Jigsaw
- Ask Aspel
- Patently Obvious
- Object in Question
- Jim'll Fix It
- What's the Idea (writer and presenter)
- Game for a Laugh
- The 6 O'Clock Show
- Home James (James Mason documentary)
- Mad Science
- The Word
- See It Saw It
- 3-2-1 (game designer)
- Mooncat – presenter
- Magic Music Man (art director)
- Fun Factory
- Rolf on Saturday, OK!
- Fantastic Facts (with Jonathan Ross)

== Stage shows ==
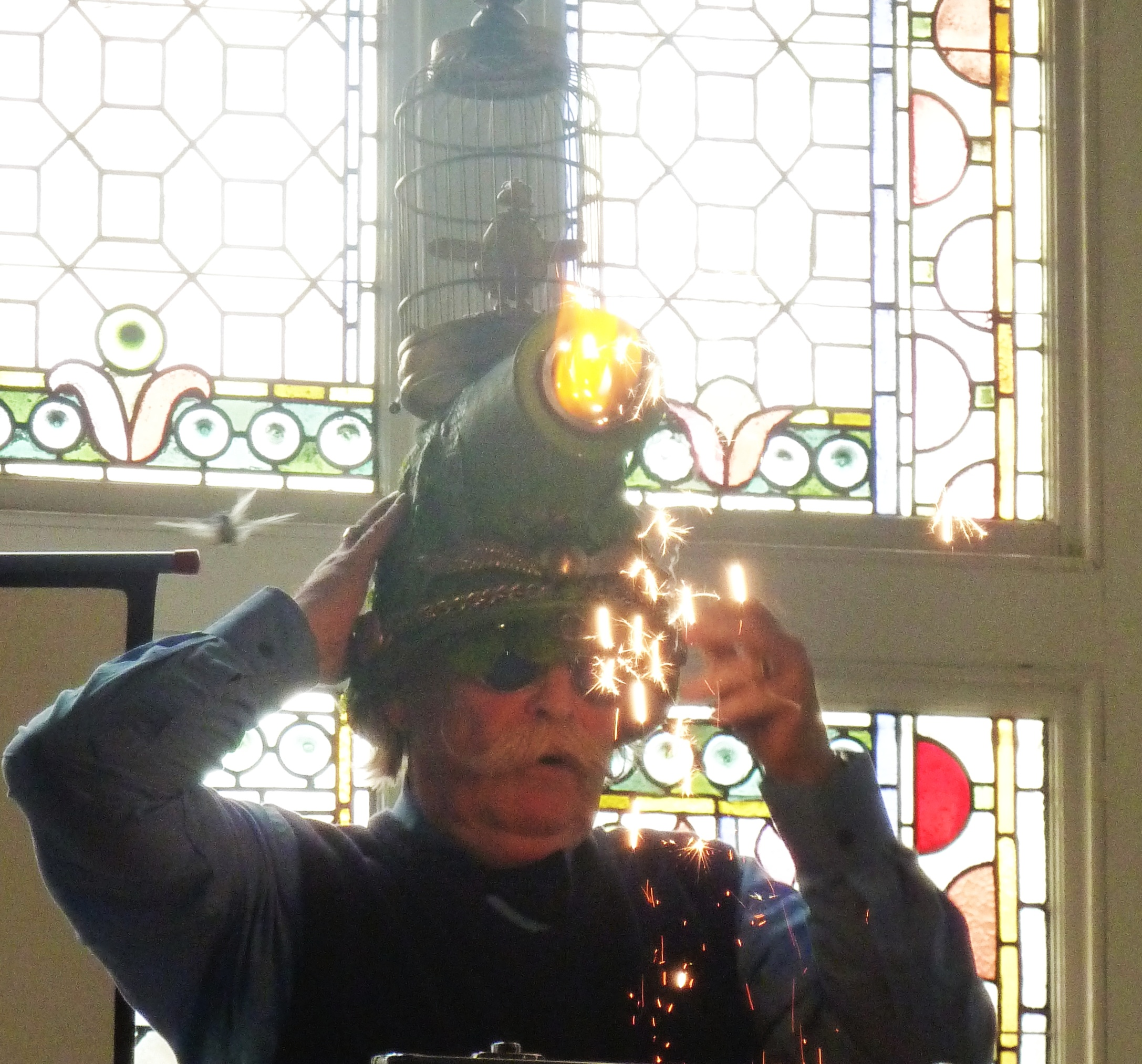
Lunn demonstrates his combined bird lure and punt gun hat, Lincoln, 2011

- Huddersfield Novelty Suicide Company – Disco Queen (pantomime)
- Theatre Museum, Covent Garden (one-man-show)

== Books ==
- Mad Things to Make from 'Vision On' (1976)
- Cheap, Cheerful and Sometimes Grotty Gifts to Make (1984)
- My Best Cellar: An Autobiography Up to the Age of Eleven... and Other Stuff (2008), Shaffron Publishing Ltd ISBN 0955615518, ISBN 978-0955615511
- No Animals Were Harmed Making These Christmas Cards (2012)

== Awards ==
- Prix Jeunesse
- BAFTA Harlequin Award for Drama/Light Entertainment (for Jigsaw)
- Critic's Award
- Ohio State Award

== See also ==
- Tim Hunkin, English engineer, cartoonist, writer and artist
