= Clive Doig =

British television producer

Clive Doig (born 11 August 1940) is a retired British television producer.

Doig worked as a vision mixer for the BBC and his work in that capacity for the drama series Doctor Who is documented on some DVD extras where Doig contributes in interview and to commentaries. Early in his career he produced the series for deaf children Vision On before becoming known as the creator-producer of a large number of children's programmes. Working for the BBC, he created programmes such as Jigsaw, which ran from 1979 to 1984, for which he won a BAFTA award. In the early 1980s, Doig produced the factual series The Deceivers and Eureka, both of which were fronted by Jeremy Beadle prior to his role on ITV's Game for a Laugh. Doig's other series included Puzzle Trail, Beat the Teacher, The Album, Abracadabra, Johnny Ball Reveals All, Eat Your Words and See It Saw It. Doig is also a deviser of puzzles, including the long-running Brainbox for the weekly television listings magazine Radio Times.

Doig often cast the same actors in different series. Among those who have appeared in several Doig projects are Janet Ellis, Philip Fox, Julia Binsted, Sylvester McCoy and Mark Speight.

Doig writes the Trackword puzzles in the Radio Times magazine.
