= SMart =

British CBBC television programme

- Genre: Art & Crafts
- Presented by: Mark Speight (1994–2008); Jay Burridge (1994–2003); Zoe Ball (1994–1996); Josie d'Arby (1996–1998); Kirsten O'Brien (1999–2009); Lizi Botham (1999–2004); Susan Ribeiro (2002–2003); Mike Fischetti (2007–2009); Various Guest Presenters (2007–2009)
- Theme music composer: Kjartan Poskitt (1994–2003); Steve Brown (2003–07); Matt Thomas (2007–09)
- Country of origin: United Kingdom
- Original language: English
- No. of series: 16
- No. of episodes: 199

Production
- Executive producer: Joe Godwin
- Production locations: BBC Pebble Mill (1994–2004); BBC Television Centre (2004–09)
- Running time: 25 minutes (1994–2006); 60 minutes (2007–09)

Original release
- Network: BBC One (1994–2006); BBC Two (2007–08); CBBC (2009)
- Release: 5 October 1994 – 4 April 2009

Related
- SMart on the Road; SMart Hart; SMarteenies

SMart is a British CBBC television programme based on art, which began in 1994 and ended in 2009. The programme was recorded at BBC Television Centre in London. Previously it had been recorded in Studio A at Pebble Mill Studios in Birmingham. The format is similar to the Tony Hart programmes Take Hart and Hartbeat. The show was revamped into an hour-long show in 2007; from 1994 to 2006 it was previously a 25-minute show. From 1994 to 2005, the show also featured Morph, originally from Take Hart. The series run featured 199 episodes, last airing on 11 August 2011.

== Production ==
The BBC noticed the success of Art Attack with Neil Buchanan for CITV which started in 1990 and decided to create their own art show that was accessible to children similar to Art Attack.

The original theme tune was composed by Kjartan Poskitt, famous for the Murderous Maths series of books. From 2003, a different tune was used, written by Steve Brown (known as the fictional musical director Glen Ponder in Knowing Me, Knowing You with Alan Partridge). In 2007, this was remixed by Matt Thomas of Mosquito Music in line with the new format.

In 2007, the new autumn series had a new format mixing some of the old segments with new ideas. It was aired on Sunday, and repeated on Wednesdays. It involved more child participation in games and celebrity guests. This new format also allowed for episodes of The Fairly OddParents (and sometimes Thumb Wrestling Federation) to be aired halfway in. One of the segments displayed art that had been sent in by viewers, to the backing music of 'Give It Away' by Zero 7.

Following the death of presenter Mark Speight's fiancée Natasha Collins in January 2008, repeats of the show and its CBeebies spin-off SMarteenies were suspended. Speight left the programme, saying his "tragic loss" had left him unable to continue; he later committed suicide. The BBC indicated, however, that there would still be a new series of SMart later that year.

The format was utilised again when a new series began with a new timeslot on Sunday 29 June 2008, airing on CBBC on BBC Two, still presented by Kirsten O'Brien and Mike Fischetti. A special tribute to Mark Speight was also broadcast. Along with this new format, guest presenters appear each week to assist the two presenters.

Series 16 began airing on 3 January 2009 in the same style to the series before. The major change was that the original airings moved to the CBBC channel rather than BBC Two. Kirsten O'Brien and Mike Fischetti both returned to host the show and the show continued to have guest presenters. The games involving children in the studio were dropped and instead children participated via webcam or pre-recorded on location. The show also added segments on fun aspects of digital photography.

== Spin-offs ==
The success of SMart allowed it to spawn various spin-off series. The first was SMart on the Road where either Mark Speight or Kirsten O'Brien, with the help of Lizi Botham, would travel around the country helping people with major projects, for example decorating a room or making a fun garden. It starred Kirsten O'Brien, Mark Speight, Jay Burridge and Lizi Botham.

SMarteenies was the second spin-off, where Kirsten, Mark, Jay and "Bizi Lizi" went through fun makes for younger viewers, including man of letters and shapes and Kirsten's Household Makes with Doogie the Dog. This programme was specifically aimed at a younger demographic, roughly from 3–6 years old on was aired on CBeebies. It starred Kirsten O'Brien, Mark Speight, Jay Burridge and Lizi Botham.

A special episode, SMart Africa, was made by the BBC to coincide with Africa Week. The episode contained easy ways to make things. This episode, with Kirsten O'Brien and Mark Speight, was aired as part of the 2003 series.

== Presenters ==
Presenter	Start	Finish
Zoe Ball	1994	1996
Josie d'Arby	1996	1998
Jay Burridge	1994	2003
Susan Ribeiro	2002	2003
Lizi Botham	1999	2004
Mark Speight	1994	2008
Kirsten O'Brien	1999	2009
Mike Fischetti	2007	2009

=== Guest presenters ===
==== 2007 ====
9 September	16 September	23 September	30 September	7 October	14 October	21 October	28 October	4 November	11 November	18 November	25 November	2 December	9 December
Lil' Chris	Ross Lee	Anne Foy	James Phelps & Oliver Phelps	Lizo Mzimba	Stephanie McIntosh	Barney Harwood	Bill Turnbull	Dani Harmer	Jake Humphrey	Andy Akinwolere	Edith Bowman	Ed Petrie	Iwan Thomas
16 December
Anthony Horowitz

==== 2008 ====
29 June	6 July	13 July	20 July	27 July	3 August	10 August	17 August	24 August	31 August	7 September	14 September	21 September
Sam Nixon & Mark Rhodes	Melvin Odoom	Ed Petrie	Ortis Deley	Lizo Mzimba	Andy Akinwolere	Michael Absalom	James Mackenzie	Ben Hanson & Ciaran Joyce	Ted Robbins	Rani Price	Sam Nixon & Mark Rhodes	Zoe Salmon

==== 2009 ====
3 January	10 January	17 January	31 January	7 February	14 February	21 February	28 February	7 March	14 March	21 March	28 March	4 April
Barney Harwood	Arlene Phillips & Bruno Tonioli	Ben Major	Carol Kirkwood	Johny Pitts	Martin Offiah	Konnie Huq	Phillips Idowu	The Saturdays	Michael Absalom	Helen Skelton & Joel Defries	Andy Akinwolere	Bill Oddie

== Series guide ==
Series	Editions	Start date	Finish date
1	6	5 October 1994	9 November 1994
2	12	5 October 1995	21 December 1995
3	12	3 October 1996	19 December 1996
4	12	2 October 1997	18 December 1997
5	12	1 October 1998	17 December 1998
6	12	7 October 1999	23 December 1999
7	12	5 October 2000	21 December 2000
8	13	13 November 2001	27 December 2001
9	13	12 November 2002	1 January 2003
10	11	18 November 2003	26 December 2003
11	10	16 November 2004	16 December 2004
12	15	29 November 2005	22 December 2005
13	15	9 January 2007	27 February 2007
14	16	9 September 2007	23 December 2007
15	13	29 June 2008	21 September 2008
16	13	3 January 2009	28 March 2009

== SMart on the Road series guide ==
Series	Editions	Start date	Finish Date
1	12	8 January 1999	26 March 1999
Special	1	9 April 1999	9 April 1999
2	13	10 January 2000	27 March 2000
Specials	2	28 March 2000	29 May 2000
3	12	5 January 2001	23 March 2001
Special	1	30 March 2001	30 March 2001
4	13	28 December 2001	22 March 2002
5	13	14 January 2003	25 February 2003

== Legacy ==
In March 2011, CBBC started to air Deadly Art which followed a very similar format to SMart and also stars Mike Fischetti. They look to the wild for inspiration (to tie in with the "Deadly" series e.g. Deadly 60). Then CBBC aired Totally Rubbish and their current art series is Art Ninja, whose presenter Ricky Martin said he watched Art Attack and SMart religiously as a child.
