= Mark Speight =

English television presenter (1965–2008)

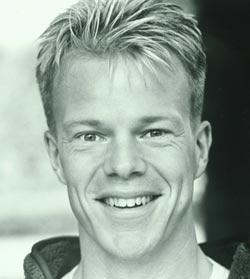
- Speight in 2007
- Born: Mark Warwick Fordham Speight; 6 August 1965; Seisdon, Staffordshire, England
- Died: 7 April 2008 (aged 42); Paddington, London, England
- Cause of death: Suicide by hanging
- Resting place: St. Michael and All Angels Churchyard, Tettenhall, Metropolitan Borough of Wolverhampton, West Midlands, England
- Occupations: Broadcaster, artist
- Years active: 1994–2008
- Employer: BBC
- Television: SMart; SMarteenies; Scratchy & Co. See It Saw It
- Partner: Natasha Collins (2005–2008) (her death)

Mark Warwick Fordham Speight (6 August 1965 – 7 April 2008) was an English television presenter and host of children's art programme SMart. Speight was born in Seisdon, Staffordshire, and left school at sixteen years old to become a cartoonist. He took a degree in commercial and graphic art and, while working in television set construction; heard of auditions for a new children's art programme. Speight was successful in his audition and became one of the first presenters of SMart, working on it for fourteen years.

Speight was also a presenter on See It Saw It, where he met his future fiancée, actress and model Natasha Collins. He took part in live events, such as Rolf on Art and his own Speight of the Art workshops for children. He was involved in charity work; he became the president of the Muscular Dystrophy Campaign's Young Pavement Artists Competition, and was a spokesperson for Childline.

In January 2008, Speight found Collins' body in the bath of their London flat. He was initially arrested on suspicion of her murder, but not charged. An inquest later determined that Collins had died of a drug overdose and severe burns from hot water, and it was death by misadventure. In April 2008, Speight was reported missing and was later discovered to have hanged himself near Paddington station. Two suicide notes were discovered, describing how he could no longer live without Collins.

== Early life ==
Speight was born in Seisdon, Staffordshire. He grew up in the village of Tettenhall, Wolverhampton and had two siblings, Tina-Louise Richmond (née Speight), and Jason Speight. His father, Oliver Warwick Speight, is a property developer, and his mother, Jacqueline Fordham Speight (née Parker), was an art teacher. Jacqueline outlived her son by five months, and died on 5 September 2008. She was 62 years old. Speight attended the private school Tettenhall College for a year, before moving to state comprehensive Regis School, now known as King's C.E. School, also in Tettenhall, at the age of twelve. Speight stated in an interview he was a slow learner at school, with a short attention span, and art was a way for him to communicate. He said he did "very badly" because he was a victim of bullying, and the "daily ordeal for two years" forced him to become the "class joker". Speight left school at sixteen and went on to attend Bilston Art School, where he took a degree in commercial and graphic art.

== Career ==
Speight intended to become a cartoonist, but he eventually became a TV presenter following a job painting the set of a television production. He auditioned for SMart and, following a successful interview where he met future co-presenter Jay Burridge, he went on to present SMart from its debut in 1994. Speight became close friends with Burridge, whose art studio in West London was used to create all of the art content for SMart; Burridge noted: "We would bounce ideas and jokes off each other all day until we had developed an almost telepathically linked knowledge of what made each other laugh." Speight and Burridge were joined by third presenter Zoe Ball, who was replaced first by Josie d'Arby, and then Kirsten O'Brien and Lizi Botham. With Burridge, O'Brien and Botham, Speight presented the spin-off TV programmes: SMart on the Road, SMarteenies, and various live events. He starred in the BAFTA-nominated ITV Saturday morning show Scratchy & Co. from 1995-98.

Speight's other work ranged from children's television to adult factual programmes. His children's television credits include playing the Abominable No Man in Timmy Mallett's Timmy Towers and presenting Beat the Cyborgs, Name That Toon, On Your Marks, Insides Out, Eat Your Words, and History Busters, the last of which won a Royal Television Society Award. Speight also worked on This Morning, The Heaven and Earth Show, The Big Breakfast and was a contestant on ITV's Gladiators and Celebrity Wrestling. Speight also played the king on children's programme See It Saw It, where he met Natasha Collins. Collins was seriously injured after being hit by a car in 2000, and had to leave the programme. Speight began a relationship with her in 2003, and they became engaged on holiday in Barbados in 2005. They planned to get married in fancy dress and Speight joked that the wedding might feature monkeys, his favourite animal.

In 2004, Speight participated in Rolf on Art, for which a giant reproduction of John Constable's The Hay Wain was created in Trafalgar Square. In 2005, he was involved in a similar project where Hans Holbein's portrait of Henry VIII and Leonardo da Vinci's Mona Lisa were both reconstructed; the latter in the grounds of Edinburgh Castle. Speight had planned a project involving a trip to Borneo in March 2008 to train abused orangutans not to fight each other; but this never took place. Speight regularly toured with Speight of the Art, a series of art workshops he ran for children, and during the Christmas period, he performed in pantomime as "Buttons" in Cinderella at the Watersmeet, Rickmansworth, in December 2007.

Speight was involved in charity work. He was President of the Muscular Dystrophy Campaign's Young Pavement Artists Competition, originally a one-off, year-long project that ended up lasting eight years, and he was a spokesperson for Childline. In 2007, he was the presenter of the Müller Big Art Project for Comic Relief in Trafalgar Square.

== Arrest and disappearance ==
On the afternoon of 3 January 2008, Speight discovered Natasha Collins' body in the bath at their flat in St John's Wood, London, and called 999. He told police that he and Collins had spent the previous evening drinking wine and vodka, and taking cocaine and sleeping pills. Speight was questioned by police and was arrested on suspicion of murder and of supplying class A drugs. He was released on bail until the first week of February. Because of this, the BBC cancelled the Saturday repeat edition of SMart. An inquest, which opened on 8 January 2008, heard that the death was not thought to be suspicious but should be "subject to further investigation". At that point, police were awaiting results of toxicology tests after a postmortem examination was inconclusive. The BBC cancelled repeat broadcasts of SMart and SMarteenies until further notice. On 28 February, Speight announced he was quitting the show because the death of Collins had left him unable to continue. Speight denied any involvement with Collins' death, and on 19 March, it was reported that the police had decided to take no further action against him.

In April 2008, the coroner recorded a verdict of death by misadventure in relation to Collins. The cause of death was "cocaine toxicity and immersion in hot water", according to the consultant pathologist. The inquest found that she had taken "very significant" amounts of cocaine with sleeping pills and vodka, and that she had suffered 60% burns to her body, including her tongue. The coroner noted that at some stage in the night after both Speight and Collins had gone to bed, Collins got up to have a bath. He said that it was "more likely than not" that a heart problem had caused Collins to fall unconscious while the hot tap was running. Following Collins' death, Speight moved in with Collins' mother.

Speight planned to meet Collins' mother at Covent Garden for coffee on the afternoon of 7 April. He was dropped off at Wood Green tube station that morning, but never appeared at the planned meeting. Speight missed an appointment with a counsellor, but this was because of confusion over dates. Two police officers spoke to him, as he appeared vacant, distracted and "deep in thought", but he refused their help. He was captured on CCTV in the afternoon taking money from a cash machine at Queen's Park station, and subsequently boarded a southbound Bakerloo line train. He was reported missing the following day by family and friends, and his mother and Collins' mother made a public appeal in which they urged him to make contact. Speight's father also appealed.

== Death and inquest ==
On 13 April 2008, Speight's body was discovered hanging from the roof of MacMillan House, adjacent to London's Paddington Station, hidden from public view. The discovery was made by railway workers at 10:00, and British Transport Police confirmed that the body was Speight's on 14 April. An inquest into his death opened on 16 April, and a post-mortem confirmed the cause of death as hanging. It was then adjourned until 20 May. The police said Speight may have used a sixth-floor fire exit to get to the area where he was found.

The report of Speight's death on the BBC's children's news programme Newsround provoked complaints that it upset young viewers. The programme had avoided use of the word "suicide" and had instead reported that "police don't think he was killed by anyone else". Thousands of children wrote poems, painted pictures, or sent letters of condolence to express their grief – "over 7,000 to the BBC and over 15,000 on a website".

Speight's funeral was held on 28 April at St Michael and All Angels' Church in Tettenhall and hundreds went to pay their respects. The service included a performance by the choir from Tettenhall College, Speight's former school, and his coffin was carried out of the church accompanied by the theme tune of SMart. He was later cremated and his ashes were interred in Tettenhall. In May, the inquest resumed and determined that Speight was deeply depressed by his fiancée's death. It was also disclosed that suicide notes had been found, one in his left pocket, and one addressed to his parents in his diary at his home. The notes described how he could not "contemplate life without [Collins]". The coroner, Paul Knapman, said there were no suspicious circumstances surrounding the death. In May 2008, Speight's father created a foundation, Speight of the Art, or SP8 of the Art and launched it at a memorial service that took place on what would have been his forty-third birthday, 6 August 2008, at St Paul's Church in Covent Garden, London.

== See also ==
- List of solved missing person cases (2000s)
