= Don't Tell Father =

- Genre: Sitcom
- Written by: Roy Clarke
- Directed by: Harold Snoad
- Starring: Tony Britton; Susan Hampshire; Caroline Quentin; Richard Ashton; Philip Fox
- Theme music composer: Nick Ingman
- Country of origin: United Kingdom
- Original language: English
- No. of series: 1
- No. of episodes: 6

Production
- Producer: Harold Snoad
- Editor: Andy Quested
- Camera setup: Multi-camera
- Running time: 30 minutes
- Production company: BBC

Original release
- Network: BBC1
- Release: 26 April – 31 May 1992

Don't Tell Father is a British television sitcom written by Roy Clarke that was first broadcast on BBC1 from 26 April to 31 May 1992. The series starred Tony Britton, Susan Hampshire, Caroline Quentin, Richard Ashton and Philip Fox.

== Premise ==
The series follows a self-regarding veteran actor, Vivian Bancroft, who dominates the lives of his fifth wife, Natasha, and four grown-up children: Kate, Garth, Spirit and Congreve. Vivian is particularly outraged by his eldest daughter, Kate's, engagement to Marvin Whipple, a driving instructor.

== Cast ==
=== Main ===
- Tony Britton as Vivian Bancroft
- Susan Hampshire as Natasha Bancroft
- Caroline Quentin as Kate Bancroft
- Richard Ashton as Garth Bancroft
- Philip Fox as Marvin Whipple

=== Recurring ===
- Hilda Braid as Mrs Dawson (3 episodes)
- Liz Daniels as Alemka (3 episodes)
- Anna Dawson as Stella Whipple (3 episodes)
- Jack Smethurst as Ron Whipple (3 episodes)
- Jo-Anne Sale as Spirit Bancroft (2 episodes)

== Episodes ==
No.	Title	Produced & Directed by	Written by	Original release date
1	"Vivian & Marvin"	Harold Snoad	Roy Clarke	26 April 1992
Vivian discovers that his eldest daughter, Kate, votes Conservative. He and his fifth wife, Natasha, plan to marry her off to a left-wing aristocrat, but Kate, unbeknownst to them, is engaged to Marvin Whipple, a driving instructor. Vivian is to be interviewed by a camera crew later that day. He decides to host a lunch party, inviting all his four children. Kate decides to invite a reluctant Marvin, much to Vivian's displeasure.
2	"The Film Studio"	Harold Snoad	Roy Clarke	3 May 1992
3	"Marvin's Parents"	Harold Snoad	Roy Clarke	10 May 1992
4	"Vivian's Shower"	Harold Snoad	Roy Clarke	17 May 1992
5	"Sacked"	Harold Snoad	Roy Clarke	24 May 1992
6	"Car Trouble"	Harold Snoad	Roy Clarke	31 May 1992

== Reception ==
Of the series, in his Radio Times Guide to TV Comedy, Mark Lewisohn wrote: "Tony Britton hammed it up for all he was worth as the awful Vivian, and Caroline Quentin proved particularly adept at delivering Roy Clarke's witty dialogue, but the piece as a whole lacked the magic ingredient which made so many of the writer's ideas long-running series."
