= Scratchy & Co. =

- Genre: Children's entertainment
- Starring: Ronni Ancona; Elliot Henderson-Boyle; Mark Speight
- Country of origin: United Kingdom
- Original language: English
- No. of series: 4
- No. of episodes: 72

Production
- Production companies: Mentorn Midlands in association with Carlton UK Productions and Central

Original release
- Network: ITV
- Release: 6 May 1995 – 25 April 1998

Scratchy & Co. is a British children's entertainment show that aired on ITV on Saturday mornings from 6 May 1995 to 25 April 1998.

== Premise ==
Scratchy & Co. starred Mark Speight as "Scratchy" and Elliot Henderson-Boyle as "Reg". Other characters included Annabel and a Scottish girl, both played by comedian and impressionist Ronni Ancona. The main gimmick of the show was that the cast wore solid rubber wigs and eccentric jackets. A stylistic similarity might be noted between this approach and Max Headroom. This format only lasted for its first series.

Later series introduced other characters such as Sedgely the penguin and Fathead the football.

From the second series, the show moved away from the original Max Headroom-esque style, into a studio where Scratchy (now minus the rubber wig) sat behind a desk, with Reg behind a window. At this point, guests were invited into the studio and interviewed. However, most of the characters which had been introduced earlier were dropped.

Gail Porter was a frequent guest presenter in the third and fourth series.

The show was nominated for a BAFTA. It was axed after the fourth series in 1998 as part of a revamp of CITV's Saturday morning line-up which took effect that autumn with the launch of SMTV Live and CD:UK.

== Programmes ==
- Gladiators: Train 2 Win (1995)
- It's Not Fair (1998)
- Massive! (1995)

== Transmissions ==
| Series | Start date | End date | Episodes |
|---|---|---|---|
| 1 | 6 May 1995 | 16 December 1995 | 21 |
| 2 | 4 May 1996 | 24 August 1996 | 17 |
| 3 | 4 January 1997 | 26 April 1997 | 17 |
| 4 | 3 January 1998 | 25 April 1998 | 17 |
