= Zoe Ball =

British TV and radio personality (born 1970)

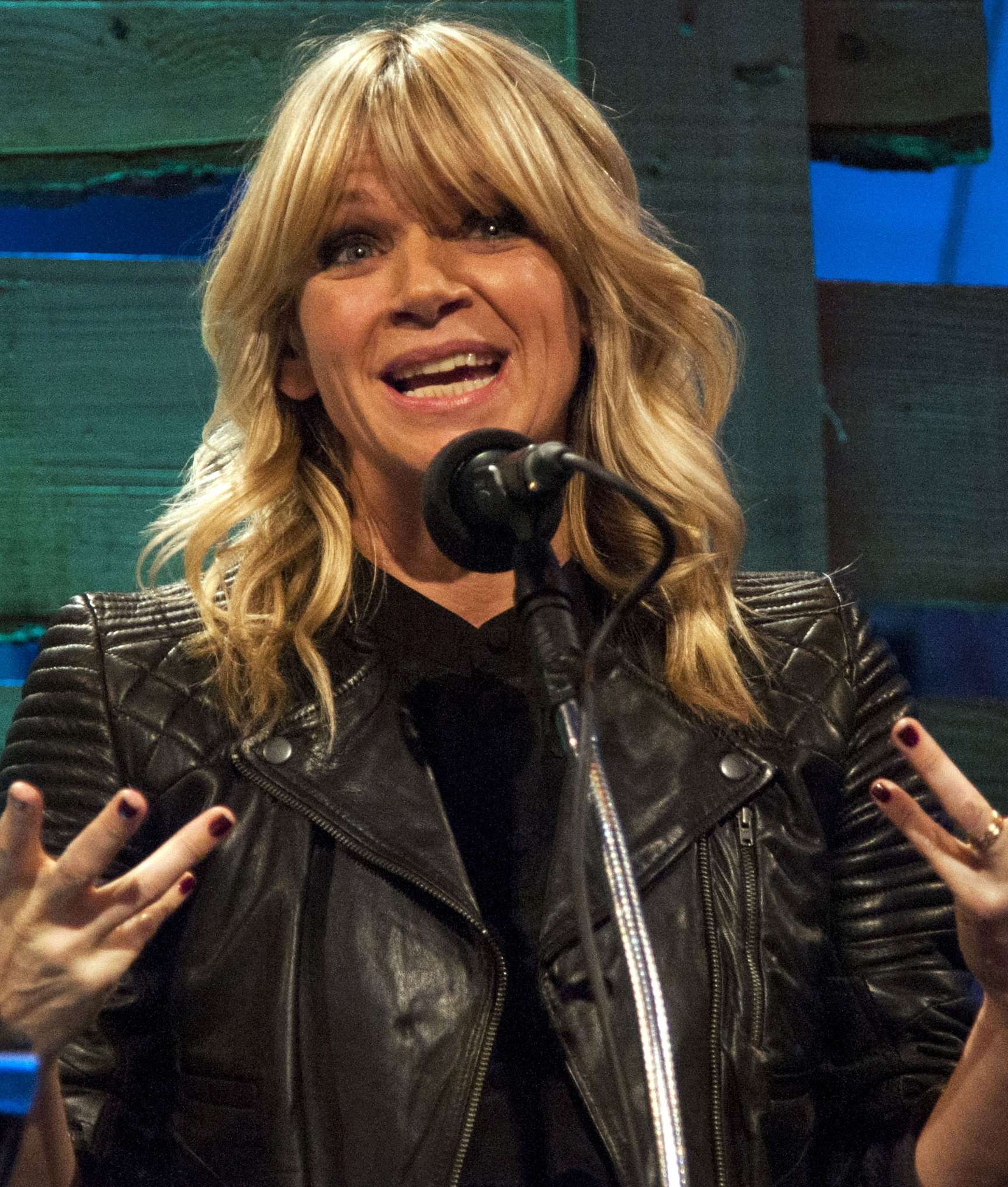
- Ball in 2014
- Born: Zoe Louise Ball; 23 November 1970 (age 55); Blackpool, Lancashire, England
- Occupations: Presenter, broadcaster
- Years active: 1993–present
- Employer: Bauer Media Audio UK
- Spouse: Norman Cook (m. 1999; div. 2020)
- Children: 2
- Father: Johnny Ball

Zoe Louise Ball (born 23 November 1970) is a British broadcaster and presenter. She was the first female host of the Radio 1 and Radio 2 breakfast shows for the BBC, and in 2024 was confirmed as the second-highest-paid BBC presenter after Gary Lineker.

In 2018, Ball was announced as the new host of The Radio 2 Breakfast Show and took over from Chris Evans in January 2019, before stepping down from the programme in December 2024.

Ball presented the children's show Live & Kicking, alongside Jamie Theakston, from 1996 to 1999. In 2005, she was a contestant in the third series of Strictly Come Dancing. Following this, in 2011 she replaced Claudia Winkleman as host of the BBC Two spin-off show Strictly Come Dancing: It Takes Two until her departure in 2021. Ball also hosted the Strictly Come Dancing Live Tour in 2011 and 2015.

== Early life and education ==
Zoe Louise Ball was born on 23 November 1970 in Blackpool, Lancashire. She is the daughter of the children's TV presenter Johnny Ball and his wife Julia (née Anderson). The couple divorced when Ball was two and she was raised with her father.

Ball was educated at Heston Junior School in the district of Hounslow between 1975 and 1978. Her family then moved to Farnham Common in Buckinghamshire. She attended Farnham Common First School and Farnham Common Middle School, before moving to Holy Cross Convent School in Chalfont St Peter and Amersham College of Art and Technology for a "City & Guilds in radio and journalism". When she was in her teens, she seriously considered trying to find work as a magician's assistant.

== Career ==
=== Television ===
Ball began her television career as a presenter on the pre-school programme Playdays. From 1993–1995 she was also a presenter on Children's BBC.

Ball became a runner at Granada Television and researcher for Cool Cube (1990–1994), a children's Saturday afternoon magazine show, produced at Granada's studio in Manchester, by Clear Idea Television, and broadcast on the British Satellite Broadcasting channel Galaxy.

From 1994–1996, Ball presented SMart with Mark Speight and Jay Burridge. In 1995, Ball hosted Fully Booked for the first series. In 1997 and 1998, she was a regular presenter on Top of the Pops, usually alternating with fellow presenters and DJs Jayne Middlemiss and Jo Whiley.

In 1996, Ball was a co-host with Jamie Theakston in BBC One's Saturday morning children's programme Live & Kicking. In 1998, television personality Chris Evans was a guest of the show, and later employed both Ball and Theakston to co-host the Channel 4 Wednesday night chat/music show The Priory, under Ginger Productions.

Ball’s presenting jobs have also included hosting The Big Breakfast on Channel 4,

Ball co-hosted the 2002 Brit Awards with Frank Skinner, In 2005, she co-hosted the BBC reality show Strictly Dance Fever. In 2006, Ball co-hosted the ITV programme Extinct, alongside Trevor McDonald.

In January 2007, Ball presented the second series of ITV's Soapstar Superstar, taking over from Fern Britton and Ben Shephard, who hosted the first series. In March 2007, she hosted the ITV talent search Grease Is the Word.

Alongside Jamie Theakston, Ball presented Channel 5's quiz series Britain's Best Brain in 2009. Ball has guest presented several episodes of The One Show as a stand-in for Alex Jones.

On 4 August 2013, as hostess of a special entitled Doctor Who Live: The Next Doctor, she revealed Peter Capaldi as the incoming Twelfth Doctor and hosted his first interview in that capacity.

In November 2013, Ball co-hosted the BBC One Children in Need telethon, alongside Sir Terry Wogan, Fearne Cotton, Nick Grimshaw and Tess Daly. In 2014, Ball presented a BBC Two spin-off from The Voice UK called The Voice: Louder on Two. The show aired for one series of ten episodes.

In 2015, Ball hosted EastEnders: Backstage Live, a spin-off show during the EastEnders live week. She co-presented the BBC Young Dancer competition with Darcey Bussell on BBC Two.

Ball also narrated two ITV specials, The Nation's Favourite '70s Number One and The Nation's Favourite '80s Number One, as well as the BBC One series Don't Tell the Bride. In 2016, Ball co-presented Can't Touch This, a Saturday night game show for BBC One, alongside Ashley Banjo.

Ball narrated The Nation's Favourite Carpenters Song, and guest-presented an episode of Film 2016. In 2017, Ball co-presented The Big Family Cooking Showdown with Nadiya Hussain on BBC Two.

Since 2020, Ball has appeared alongside her son Woody Fred Cook on Celebrity Gogglebox.

In 2021, Ball appeared on The Masked Dancer, masked as Llama. She was the sixth celebrity to be unmasked.

In 2023, Ball appeared as herself in Episode 1 of the BBC One comedy Queen of Oz.

In 2024, Ball appeared as a panellist on the "New Year's Treat" episode of Taskmaster for that year.

In May 2026 Ball was the subject of the BBC genealogy series Who Do You Think You Are?, in which she appeared alongside her father.

==== Strictly Come Dancing and It Takes Two ====
In October 2005, Ball became a contestant on the third series of the BBC One talent show Strictly Come Dancing, where she was partnered by Ian Waite. Ball and Waite were ranked in third place; they also scored 38/40 (including two tens) for three dances in the series and one in the Christmas special.

In 2011, Ball took over from Claudia Winkleman as the host of Strictly Come Dancing's sister show It Takes Two, airing every weeknight on BBC Two; in 2014, whilst Winkleman was on leave after her daughter suffered serious burn injuries, Ball co-hosted the main show. On 17 May 2021, Ball announced she was leaving as a presenter of It Takes Two after ten years on the show. In May 2026, Ball said she had lost out on gaining a main presenting role on Strictly Come Dancing.

=== Radio ===
Although known primarily for her television work, Ball first worked in radio, after she became co-host of Radio 1 Breakfast on BBC Radio 1 in October 1997 with Kevin Greening. She became the sole host, the first female DJ to do so. At this time, her hard-drinking, hard-partying lifestyle contributed to the identification of the so-called "ladette culture" of the late 1990s. She was twice warned by the BBC for swearing on the radio.

Ball left BBC Radio 1 in March 2000. Her final show was on 10 March 2000; she was succeeded by Sara Cox.

Ball returned to radio in mid-2002 when she joined London radio station Xfm, where she presented the weekday drivetime show until December 2003. In January 2004, she took over a Friday evening music show for the station. She also stood in for Ricky Gervais while he filmed the second series of The Office. She left Xfm at the end of 2004.

In September 2007, she returned to BBC Radio and co-hosted a show with Sara Cox, celebrating 40 years of BBC Radio 1 and BBC Radio 2.

From 2006, she provided relief presenting duties for BBC Radio 2, fronted specialist documentaries, sat in for Dermot O'Leary for three weeks in February 2006, and co-presented (with Danny Baker) the hastily conceived replacement for Jonathan Ross' Saturday morning show, in the wake of Ross's suspension due to Sachsgate in 2008.

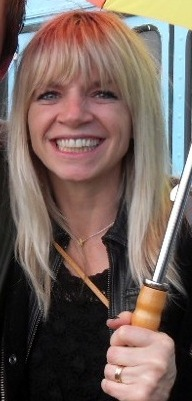
Zoe Ball in 2009

In 2009, Ball became the usual relief presenter for Ken Bruce's weekday mid-morning show on BBC Radio 2. She also began hosting the Saturday breakfast show from 6 am to 8 am on the network from 6 June 2009 as part of a shake-up of weekend programming at Radio 2. Ball left Radio 2 for a while as her last show was broadcast on Saturday 28 January 2012. Her replacement in that slot was Anneka Rice.

Ball covered The Radio 2 Breakfast Show for Chris Evans on several occasions.

From 4 March 2017 to 22 December 2018, Ball returned to Radio 2 on permanent basis where she presented the Saturday afternoon slot on BBC Radio 2 between 3 pm and 6 pm, taking over from Dermot O'Leary.

On 3 October 2018, she was announced by Chris Evans as the new host of The Radio 2 Breakfast Show, which began on 14 January 2019. Rylan Clark replaced Ball in the Saturday mid-afternoon slot.

In August 2024, the BBC confirmed Ball was the second-highest paid BBC presenter after Gary Lineker, with a salary of £950,000, having exceeded that figure for the previous three years.

From 12 August to 23 September 2024, Ball took a six-week break from the show with Scott Mills covering for her. Soon after, on 19 November she announced on the show that she would step down as host of The Breakfast Show from 20 December with Mills taking over permanently in the new year, but would remain working for the station.

On 18 February 2025, it was announced that Ball would begin a new Saturday show replacing Pick of the Pops, which had held the 1 pm to 3 pm slot for 16 years. Her show began on Saturday 3 May while Pick of the Pops moved to Sundays from 5 pm to 7pm.

On 13 December 2025, Ball announced that she would step down from her Saturday show the following week, with Emma Willis taking over the slot thereafter; however, Ball was to remain on the station to front various specials.

In July 2026, it was confirmed that Ball would be joining Greatest Hits Radio to present a new weekday afternoon show, replacing Kate Thornton from 7 September 2026.

== Personal life ==
Whilst at BBC Radio 1, Ball began a relationship with the DJ and musician Norman Cook, known as Fatboy Slim. The couple married at Babington House in Somerset in August 1999. In 2003, Ball and Cook separated when Ball revealed that she had had an affair with Dan Peppe; they later reconciled. The couple have a son and a daughter. On 24 September 2016, Cook and Ball announced their separation after 18 years together. The couple finalised their divorce in 2020.

Between 2017 and 2023, Ball was in a relationship with fashion model and carpenter Michael Reed.

Since June 2025, Ball has been in a relationship with TV production designer Mathieu Weekes.

== Filmography ==
=== Radio ===
Year	Title	Role	Slot	Station	Notes
1997–1998	Radio 1 Breakfast	Co-presenter with Kevin Greening	6:30–9:00 weekdays	BBC Radio 1	
1998–2000	Radio 1 Breakfast	Presenter	6:00-9:00 weekdays	BBC Radio 1	
2002–2003	Weekday Drivetime	Presenter	16:00–19:00 weekdays	Xfm	
2004	Friday evenings	Presenter	19:00–21:00 Fridays	Xfm	
2007	Zoe Ball & Sara Cox	Co-presenter with Sara Cox	13:00–16:00 Sunday (one-off)	BBC Radio 1	Special 1-episode show
2008	Danny Baker & Zoe Ball	Co-presenter with Sara Cox	10:00–13:00 Saturday	BBC Radio 2	4 episodes
2009–2012	Saturday weekend breakfast	Presenter	6:00–8:00 Saturdays	BBC Radio 2	
2017–2018	Saturday mid-afternoons	Presenter	15:00–18:00 Saturdays	BBC Radio 2	
2019–2024	The Radio 2 Breakfast Show	Presenter	6:30–9:30 weekdays	BBC Radio 2	
2025	Saturday lunchtimes	Presenter	13:00–15:00 Saturdays	BBC Radio 2	
2026–present	Zoe Ball in the Afternoon	Presenter	13:00–16:00 weekdays	Greatest Hits Radio	

=== Television ===
Year	Title	Role	Notes
1994–1996	SMart	Co-presenter	
1995	Fully Booked	Presenter	
1996	The Big Breakfast	Co-presenter	
1996–1998	Top of the Pops	Co-presenter	
1996–1999	Live & Kicking	Co-presenter	
1999–2001	The Priory	Co-presenter	With Jamie Theakston
2002	Brit Awards	Co-presenter	With Frank Skinner
2005	Strictly Dance Fever	Co-presenter	
2005	Strictly Come Dancing	Contestant	Series 3
2006	Extinct	Co-presenter	1 series; with Trevor McDonald
2007	Soapstar Superstar	Presenter	1 series
2007	Grease Is the Word	Presenter	1 series
2009	Britain's Best Brain	Co-presenter	1 series; with Jamie Theakston
2011	Mongrels	Herself	1 episode
2011–2020	Strictly Come Dancing: It Takes Two	Presenter	10 series, final 2 co-presented by Rylan Clark
2012–2013, 2016–2017	The One Show	Guest presenter	6 episodes
2013	Doctor Who Live: The Next Doctor	Presenter	One-off episode
2013	Children in Need	Co-presenter	
2013	The Nation's Favourite Elvis Song	Narrator	One-off episode
2014	The Voice: Louder on Two	Presenter	1 series
2014	Strictly Come Dancing	Stand-in presenter	6 episodes
2015	EastEnders: Backstage Live	Presenter	One-off episode
2015	The Nation's Favourite '70s Number One	Narrator	One-off episode
2015	BBC Young Dancer	Co-presenter	Grand final; with Darcey Bussell and Clemency Burton-Hill
2015	Hacker's Birthday Bash: 30 Years of Children's BBC	Herself	One-off episode
2015	Don't Tell the Bride	Narrator	1 series
2015	The Nation's Favourite '80s Number One	Narrator	One-off episode
2016	Can't Touch This	Co-presenter	1 series; with Ashley Banjo
2016	The Nation's Favourite Carpenters Song	Narrator	One-off episode
2016	Film 2016	Guest presenter	1 episode
2017	Saturday Mash-Up!	Guest	1 episode
2017	The Big Family Cooking Showdown	Co-presenter	1 series; with Nadiya Hussain
2018	Zoe Ball's Hardest Road Home		One-off
2018	Zoe Ball on...Saturday/Sunday	Presenter	1 series + Christmas specials
2020	The Big Night In	Co-presenter	
2020–present	Celebrity Gogglebox	Herself	5 series; with son Woody Fred Cook
2021	The Masked Dancer	Contestant	Llama, revealed in Episode 5
2021	The Wheel	Participant	Christmas special
2023	Queen of Oz	Herself	1 episode (Ep 1)
2023	Mamma Mia! I Have a Dream	Presenter	Talent show
2025	VE Day 80: A Celebration to Remember	Presenter	Concert
2026	Just One Thing	Co-presenter	With Clive Myrie and Roman Kemp
2026	Who Do You Think You Are?	Herself	One episode
2026	Deal or No Deal	Participant	One episode
