= Philip Fox (actor) =

English actor

- Occupation: Actor
- Years active: 1982–present

Philip "Phil" Fox is an English film and television actor, known particularly for comic roles. His appearances include Genie in the House, Maurice, People Like Us, Waking the Dead, Maxwell, Don't Tell Father, Midsomer Murders and Foyle's War. He also appeared in the film Venus alongside Peter O'Toole.

He has also appeared in many children's programmes and has a long association with producer Clive Doig, who cast him in the children's shows Eureka, The Album, Eat Your Words and See It Saw It.

He has also appeared in very many productions for BBC Radio 4, most notably in a dramatisation of the Terry Pratchett books Mort and Small Gods. He has also played the part of Maurice Horton in The Archers.

Fox played the estate agent in the first episode of Steve Coogan's comedy series I'm Alan Partridge. He also played the character Baldrick in the original pilot of the Blackadder series, which was not broadcast until 2023. For the series itself, actor and TV presenter Tony Robinson was cast in the role.

== Selected credits ==
=== Television ===
Year	Title	Role	Network	Notes
1982	Blackadder	Baldrick	BBC	Untransmitted Pilot
1984–86	Hilary	Wesley	BBC	9 episodes
1985	Me and My Girl	Gavin	LWT	Episode: "Forty Years On"
1985	Troubles and Strife	Christopher	Central	2 episodes
1986	Duty Free	Neville	Yorkshire Television	Episode: "The Go Between"
1986	Eureka	Mr. Halfpenny	BBC	6 episodes
1986	Full House	Young Man	Thames	Episode: "The Facts of Life"
1987	The Album	Albie Bumble	BBC	6 episodes
1987	The Bretts	Julian Williams	Central	Episode: "Vagabounds and Thieves"
1987	T-Bag Bounces Back	Bobby Jobsworth	CITV	Episode: "Bobby Jobsworth and the Temple of Doom"
1987	Watching	Sidney Clough	Granada	5 episodes
1988	The Bill	Mr. Bond	Thames	Episode: "The Quick and the Dead"
1988	The Lenny Henry Show	Cinema Cashier	BBC	Episode: "Enterprise Zones"
1988	King and Castle	Vicar	Thames	Episode: "Class"
1989	'Allo, 'Allo!	British Agent #1	BBC	Episode: "All in Disgeese"
1989	In Sickness and in Health	Vicar	BBC	Episode: "Christmas Special"
1990	The Bill	Lionel Brown	Thames	Episode: "Blue Eyed Boy"
1990	You Rang, M'Lord?	Hamish Kintyre	BBC	Episode: "Beg, Borrow or Steal"
1991	Selling Hitler	Leo Pensch	Thames	5 episodes
1992	Don't Tell Father	Marvin Whipple	BBC	6 episodes
1992	Moon and Son	Robertson	BBC	Episode: "The Chinese Medicine Man"
1993–96	Eat Your Words	Co-Host (Self)	BBC	Series regular
1994	Under the Hammer	Henry Quarles	Meridian	Episode: "The Spectre of the Feast"
1996	The Brittas Empire	Harry Johnson	BBC	Episode: "A Walk on the Wildside"
1996	The Fortunes and Misfortunes of Moll Flanders	Priest at Wedding	Granada	TV Mini Series: 1 episode
1997	The Bill	John Reynolds	ITV	Episode: "Stolen Thunder"
1997	Casualty	Brian O' Donnell	BBC	Episode: "Tall Tales"
1997	I'm Alan Partridge	Estate Agent	BBC	Episode: "A Room with an Alan"
1998	Birds of a Feather	Rodney	BBC	Episode: "Model"
1998	The Jump	Clive Simpson	Central	1 episode
1999	Comedy Lab	Simon	Channel 4	Episode "Whatever..."
1999	Kavanagh QC	Dr. Kidd	Central	Episode: "The More Loving One"
1999	Kiss Me Kate	Client	BBC	Episode: "Closure"
1999	The Scarlet Pimpernel	Auctioneer	BBC	Episode: "A King's Ransome"
1999	Wing and a Prayer	Dr. Frederick Hornsby	Channel 5	1 episode
1999–2001	See It Saw It	Saw	BBC	Series regular
2000	EastEnders	Superintendent Wheeler	BBC	1 episode
2000	Lock, Stock...	The Accountant	Channel 4	"And Four Stolen Hooves"
2001	Doctors	Richard March	BBC	Episode: "Sugar and Spice"
2001–02	Peak Practice	Brian Wood	ITV	2 episodes
2002–03	Waking the Dead	Dr. Roberts	BBC	Episode: "Special Relationship: Part 1"
2003	Carla	Mr. Carter	ITV	TV Movie
2003	Heartbeat	Wells	ITV	Episode: "Missing in Action"
2003	Midsomer Murders	Gordon Leesmith	ITV	Episode: "Death and Dreams"
2003	Waking the Dead	Reynolds	BBC	Episode: "Breaking Glass: Part 2"
2004	Casualty	Conor Knight	BBC	Episode: "Emotional Rescue: Part 2"
2006–07	The Bill	George Robinson	ITV	2 episodes
2006–07	The Commander	Dr. Bill Flaxen	ITV	3 episodes
2006–09	Genie in the House	Mr. Preston	BBC	16 episodes
2007	Maxwell	Trevor Cook	BBC	TV Movie
2007	Trial and Retribution	Pathologist	ITV	Episode: "Curriculam Vitae: Part 1"
2008	Foyle's War	Bill Burton	ITV	Episode: "Plan of Attack"
2008	Last of the Summer Wine	Mervin	BBC	Episode: "Of Passion and Pizza"
2011	M.I. High	Philip Blagha	BBC	Episode: "The Wasp"
2011	Holby City	Kevin 'Polly' Selby	BBC	Episode: "All About Me"
2012	Inspector George Gently	Tim	BBC	Episode: "Gently in the Cathedral"
2015	Holby City	Professor Walter Dunn	BBC	Episode: "What it Takes"
2015	In and Out of the Cathedral	Iain Frobisher	BBC	2 episodes
2017	Back	UMC	Channel 4	1 episode

=== Radio ===
Date	Title	Role	Director	Station
3 December 2002	A Man's Head		Ned Chaillet	BBC Radio 4 Afternoon Play
19 April 2004	Maigret and the Burglar's Wife	Moers	Ned Chaillet	BBC Radio 4 Afternoon Play
26 April 2004	The Yellow Dog	M. Servières	Ned Chaillet	BBC Radio 4 Afternoon Play
3 May 2004	Inspector Cadaver	Brejon / Mayor's Sec / Voice	Ned Chaillet	BBC Radio 4 Afternoon Play
10 May 2004	Maigret's Little Joke	The Waiter	Ned Chaillet	BBC Radio 4 Afternoon Play
June 2004	Mort	Lesek	Claire Grove	BBC Radio 4 Extra
3 May 2005	Claw Marks on the Curtain: The Schartz-Metterklume Method	Mr Quabarl / Carter	Ned Chaillet	BBC Radio 4 Woman's Hour Drama
18 December 2005 – 31 December 2005	The Razor's Edge	Joseph	Gaynor Macfarlane	BBC Radio 4 Classic Serial
22 June 2009 – 26 June 2009	The Art of Deception	Museum Curator	Toby Swift	BBC Radio 4 Woman's Hour Drama
6 September 2009 – 13 September 2009	Boswell's Life of Johnson	Davies / Wilkes	Claire Grove	BBC Radio 4 Classic Serial
6 December 2009	The Hairy Ape		Toby Swift	BBC Radio 3 Drama on 3

=== Film ===
Year	Film	Role
1987	Maurice	Dr. Jowitt
1987	Superman IV: The Quest for Peace	Husband
1990	The Paper Mask	Anaesthetist
1994	Solitaire For 2	Businessman
1995	Paparazzo	Chat Show Host
2001	Gypsy Woman	Jones the Desk Clerk
2006	Venus	Doctor
