= Bookaboo =

- Genre: Children's
- Created by: Lucy Goodman
- Written by: Lucy Goodman; Alex Williams; Andrew Viner
- Directed by: Lucy Goodman; Ian Emes
- Narrated by: Various
- Composers: Mark Dyson; Tom Howe (season 3); John Herberman (season 4); Earl Torno (season 4); James Chapple (season 4); Graham Cornies (season 4); David Brian Kelly (season 4); Brian L Pickett (season 4)
- Countries of origin: United Kingdom; Canada (seasons 3-4)
- Original language: English
- No. of seasons: 4
- No. of episodes: 77

Production
- Executive producers: Martyn Freeman; Emma Tennant (season 1); Jamila Metran (seasons 2-3); Blair Powers (season 4)
- Producers: Lucy Goodman; Carla de Jong (season 4)
- Production location: London
- Cinematography: Trevor Forrest (season 1); Dom Kersey (season 2)
- Editors: Matthew Tabern; Etienne Proulx (seasons 3-4); Hélène Bédard (season 3); Laura Bower (season 4)
- Running time: 11 minutes
- Production companies: Happy Films (season 1); Sinking Ship Entertainment (seasons 3-4)

Original release
- Network: ITV (CITV) (2009–2010); Kids' CBC (2013–2016)
- Release: 2 March 2009 – 26 December 2016

Bookaboo is a children's television series created and produced by Lucy Goodman of Happy Films and co-directed by Ian Emes. The show incorporates puppets, celebrities, picture books, songs, and animation. The main character is Bookaboo, a renowned rock puppy who travels worldwide with his band. Lucy Goodman developed the show in response to her research on the decline of parental reading in households. The aim of Bookaboo is to encourage both children and adults to enjoy sharing books together. The series is available for streaming on Amazon Video in the United Kingdom and has aired on ABC2 in Australia, CBC Television in Canada, and Amazon Video in the United States.

== Format ==
Bookaboo, the renowned drum-playing rock puppy, expresses his need for a daily story, or he refuses to perform. The other band members, Growler on bass guitar and Paws on keyboards, discover Bookaboo on the Bookabus, where he evades stage calls through comedic sketches and songs.

Despite their efforts, the band fails to convince Bookaboo to return to the stage. Fortunately, a famous fan arrives with a "Bookabag" filled with a picture book and sits down to share it with him. Bookaboo becomes captivated and enchanted by the story, seemingly resolving his issue. As the book concludes, Bookaboo regains his rhythm, which he refers to as his "Bojo".

With the celebrity fan supporting him from the sidelines, Bookaboo thrills the audience with a drum solo. As the episode concludes, an illuminated stage sign informs the adult viewers that "1000 books per episode are donated to children who need them most".

== Featured Books ==
The show carefully chooses books from a pool of around 500 submissions per series, which come from various publishers across the UK. The selection process is based on straightforward criteria: the books must be genuinely enjoyable to be read aloud and shared by both children and adults.

== Celebrities ==
A diverse range of celebrities are invited to participate in the show, with the aim of encouraging individuals from various backgrounds to share books with children. The show has featured celebrities from different fields, including pop stars such as Melanie C, Meat Loaf, Alesha Dixon, and Lethal Bizzle. Sports personalities, including former England goalkeeper David Seaman, boxer Ricky Hatton, and wrestler Adam Copeland, have also supported Bookaboo's mission. Actors and actresses like Michael Sheen, Emilia Fox, and Stana Katic, presenters such as Paula Abdul, Amanda Holden, and Lorraine Kelly, as well as comedians like Johnny Vegas and Al Murray, have all shared a book with Bookaboo. The celebrities who participate in the show, regardless of their age, become Storytime Ambassadors for Bookaboo's "Share A Book Today" campaign, driven by their desire to promote book sharing among children and adults.

== Bookaboo Share A Book Today Campaign ==
By 2011, a total of 26,000 books had been donated to disadvantaged children throughout the United Kingdom through the collaborative efforts of Bookaboo, participating publishers, and celebrities. In 2009, Bookaboo formed partnerships with Booktrust and The Book People, resulting in the distribution of 13,000 books to children under six years old in care.

In 2011, the Pre-school Learning Alliance joined forces with Bookaboo, facilitating the distribution of an additional 13,000 books to nurseries in socioeconomically disadvantaged areas of the UK.

In 2013, Bookaboo entered a partnership with First Book Canada when the show transitioned into a UK/Canadian co-production. Similarly, in 2016, when the show premiered as an Amazon Original in the US, First Book US became the designated charity partner.

== Characters ==
=== The Story behind the band ===
All current members of Bookaboo's band were brought together at a dog rescue center when they were orphaned puppies. Recognizing their musical abilities, the center owner discovered their talent and subsequently entered them into the canine talent contest called 'Pup Idol', which they won. With their newfound success, the puppy band embarked on a global tour, travelling in their converted library truck known as the Bookabus and performing to sold-out stadiums worldwide.

=== Bookaboo ===
Bookaboo is a Jack Russell Terrier, renowned canine drummer and rock dog known worldwide. However, Bookaboo faces a unique challenge where he loses his rhythm, referred to as his 'bojo', and is unable to play unless he shares a book with someone. This is famously expressed through his line, "A story a day, or I just can't play".

The puppeteer responsible for bringing Bookaboo to life is Marcus Clarke. The design of the Bookaboo puppet was created by Paul Andrejco and constructed by Puppet Heap in Hoboken, NJ.

=== Growler ===
Growler is an American hound known for his exceptional skills as a bass guitarist. He possesses a distinctively deep voice and a unique howl and growl. Additional information regarding the origins of his name will be unveiled in an upcoming backstory. Growler made his debut in Series 2 of the United Kingdom version of the show. The puppet for Growler was designed and constructed by Puppet Heap, and he is brought to life by puppeteer Paul Andrejco.

=== Paws ===
Paws is a skilled and highly agile Dachshund known for his expertise as a keyboard player. Paws has demonstrated proficiency in playing both keyboards and keytar instruments. The puppet for Paws was created and constructed by Puppet Heap. In the United Kingdom version of the show, Paws is brought to life by puppeteer Brian Herring.

== Music ==
The music for the show, including the title music, songs, and most of the incidental music, is written, composed, and predominantly performed by Mark Dyson.

The drum solo for Bookaboo is executed by Alex Toff, who also operates the puppet's arms during the drum solo. During the performance, Alex Toff wore a Lycra-chrome green body-fitting suit, and he described the experience as the most unconventional session he had ever been part of.

Some of the songs featured on the show include:

- "Bookaboo's Book Blues": Bookaboo sings a blues song.
- "Sausages": Growler expresses his passion for sausages through rock music.
- "Hey You Make Some Noise" is an anthem that includes the line "If you rock with the pups, then you're part of the band".
- "Life on the Road" is a ballad reflecting on the experiences of being on tour.

== Merchandising ==
A pop-up book titled 'Pup Idol', featuring a sound chip, is published by Walker Books in the United Kingdom and Australia. Additionally, Walker Books publishes two stories about their touring experiences, "Puppies in the Pound" and "Dogs in Disguise," along with two activity books in the United Kingdom and Australia. DVDs of the show can be obtained in the United Kingdom through Abbey Media and in Australia through Fremantle.

== Background ==
In November 2008, ITV announced the commissioning of a series that combines live action and animation to promote literacy among children and adults in the United Kingdom, in support of the National Year of Reading 2008. The series, titled Bookaboo, was commissioned by Emma Tennant, Controller of CITV and ITV3. It is created and produced by Lucy Goodman and directed by Lucy Goodman and Ian Emes from Happy Films. Tennant also serves as the executive producer for ITV.

The thirteen-part series premiered on 2 March 2009, on the CITV channel. Initially, it was broadcast three times a day, every weekday at 12:15, 15:20, and 17:45.

In January 2009, ITV announced additional elements to accompany the series, including the Bookaboo Book Club online, live events, and in-store promotions. The show received the Preschool Live Action BAFTA at the 2009 British Academy Children's Awards. A second series, which introduces Bookaboo's bandmates, Growler and Paws, began airing on 1 November 2010, on both the CITV digital channel and ITV.

== Awards and nominations ==
The first series of Bookaboo received the Children's BAFTA Award for 'Best Pre-School Live Action' programme in 2009. The second series also won the same award in 2011. In 2009, Lucy Goodman and Ian Emes were nominated for an RTS award. Bookaboo went on to win the 2010 Broadcast Award for Best Children's Programme and the 2010 International Prix Jeunesse Award in Munich. In 2012, Bookaboo was honored with a British Animation Award in the mixed media category and was a finalist in the Children's Choice category. In 2017, Bookaboo was nominated for five Daytime Emmy Awards and received the Parent's Choice Silver Honour Award.
