= Extinct (2006 TV series) =

- Opening credits of Extinct
- Genre: Documentary
- Presented by: Zoe Ball; Sir Trevor McDonald
- Country of origin: United Kingdom
- No. of episodes: 5

Production
- Running time: 60 minutes (including adverts)
- Production company: Endemol UK

Original release
- Network: ITV
- Release: 9 December – 16 December 2006

Extinct is a British television series that aired on ITV in 2006. It features eight celebrities highlighting the plight of some of the world's most endangered species and was presented by Zoe Ball and Sir Trevor McDonald.

During the series, the public were asked to phone in and vote for which animal they wanted to receive 50% of the money raised through the phone votes, via the charity WWF. The winning animal got over £178,000 and the remaining seven shared £178,000. A sister programme called Extinct - The Quiz also aired at the same time.

== Format ==
In the first four episodes, two celebrities presented the case for their animal. A short video documentary was shown, where the celebrity was seen travelling to the land of the animal, explained why the animal is in danger and what can be done to help save. The eight celebrities were;

- Anneka Rice, television presenter - polar bear
- David Suchet, actor - giant panda
- Sadie Frost, actress and fashion designer - orangutan
- Michael Portillo, former MP - hyacinth macaw
- Graeme Le Saux, footballer - mountain gorilla
- Miranda Richardson, actress - Asian elephant
- Dermot O'Leary, television presenter - leatherback sea turtle
- Pauline Collins, actress - Bengal tiger

== Episodes ==
No.	Airdate	Overview
1	9 December	Anneka Rice visits the Arctic Circle; David Suchet visits China
2	12 December	Sadie Frost visits Borneo; Michael Portillo visits Brazil
3	13 December	Graeme Le Saux visits Rwanda; Miranda Richardson visits India
4	14 December	Dermot O'Leary visits Costa Rica; Pauline Collins visits Nepal
5	16 December	Final with all 8 celebrities

=== Final ===
In the final programme, after each celebrity explained why the public should vote for their animal, the three with the most votes were the Giant panda, the Bengal tiger and the Mountain gorilla. The most votes went to the Bengal tiger, which Pauline Collins had campaigned for.

== Extinct - The Quiz ==
Extinct - The Quiz was a five-part 60 minute quiz programme that accompanied Extinct. It was hosted by Zoë Ball and featured four families being tested on their wildlife knowledge and competing to win a holiday. The first four episodes aired each day at 5pm from 12 to 15 December. The first two programmes featured four families each day, with the next two programmes being semi finals. The final was on 16 December at 4.00pm.

== Reception ==
Winnie De'Ath, then Director of Communications for the WWF, praised the programme for giving WWF "a fantastic opportunity to reach a high audience". She also said that Extinct had "enabled us to highlight the reality of our work on the ground - showing issues such as people struggling to make a living from their natural resources. The response has been fabulous, and has raised vital funds to help us continue our urgent work."
