= Janet Ellis =

English television presenter and actress

Janet Ellis MBE
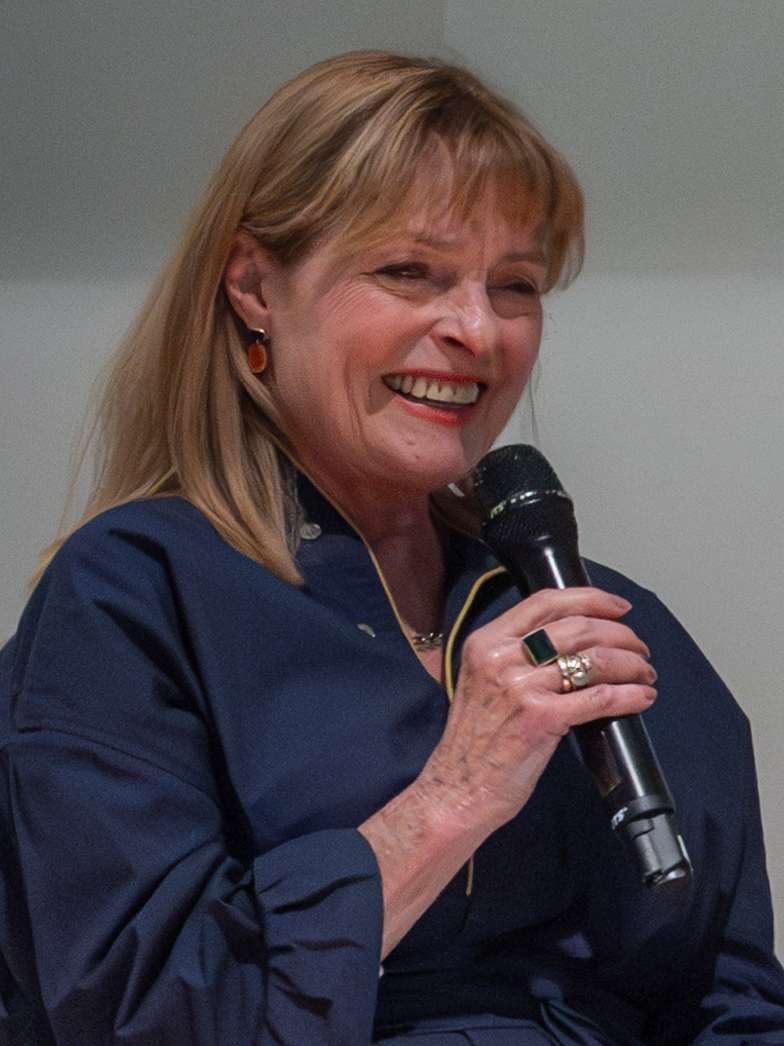
- Ellis at the 2024 Chiswick Book Festival
- Born: 16 September 1955 (age 71); Chatham, Kent, England
- Education: Royal Central School of Speech and Drama
- Occupations: TV presenter; actress; writer
- Years active: 1978–present
- Known for: Blue Peter and Jigsaw presenter
- Spouses: Robin Bextor (m. 1977; div. 1984) John Leach (m. 1988; died 2020)
- Children: 3, including Sophie Ellis-Bextor

Janet Ellis, MBE (born 16 September 1955) is an English television presenter, actress and writer, who is best known for presenting the children's television programmes Blue Peter and Jigsaw between 1979 and 1987. She has published two novels, The Butcher's Hook (2016) and How It Was (2019). She is the mother of three children, including singer/songwriter Sophie Ellis-Bextor.

== Early life ==
Ellis was born in Chatham, Kent, on 16 September 1955. Her father Michael "Mike" Ellis was a soldier who was stationed during her childhood at various places in Britain and West Germany, and her mother was Judith Newton. Accordingly, she attended seven schools in the two countries, including Russell House School in Otford, Kent between the ages of five and seven, St Hilary's in Sevenoaks, Kent between the ages of 11 and 13, and from the ages of 13 to 17, her last school was Richmond County School for Girls in Richmond, Surrey (now in London).

Having expressed an interest in acting since the age of five, she applied to and was accepted by the Central School of Speech and Drama in London but because she was too young, her place was deferred for a year. She spent the year gaining experience of the acting world by working backstage at the Comedy Theatre in central London.

== Television career ==
=== 1978–1987 ===
Ellis's first television appearance in 1978 was a small role in the BBC's children's programme Jackanory Playhouse, followed by a bit part credited as Marge's Friend in The Sweeney episode Hard Men.

Her big break came in 1979, when she landed the job of regular presenter of the Clive Doig-produced Jigsaw. Also that year she played the character of "Teka" in the Doctor Who story The Horns of Nimon. After four series in Jigsaw, Ellis left to join Blue Peter on 28 April 1983. During her four-year stint, she co-presented with Simon Groom, Sarah Greene, Peter Duncan, Michael Sundin, Mark Curry and Caron Keating. During the run, she became the first civilian woman in Europe to free fall from 20,000 feet (6,100 m) – but not before breaking her pelvis during training. Her last show was on 29 June 1987. It is sometimes claimed that Ellis was sacked from the programme for being unmarried and pregnant with son Jackson, but in recent years Ellis has stated that she was fully supported by the Blue Peter production team and the decision to leave the programme was her own.

=== 1988–1999 ===
After leaving Blue Peter, Ellis scaled back her presenting commitments in order to spend time bringing up her family. During this period she presented the BBC's Open Air programme, wrote a book entitled How to Get Married Without Divorcing Your Family with her friend and ex Blue Peter co-host Caron Keating in 1994, and provided voiceovers for numerous advertisements. She also presented the Daz Challenge in the television advertisements for three years and occasionally appeared as a co-presenter on Danny Baker's BBC Radio 1 show.

=== 2000–2013 ===
Ellis returned to the TV screen in 2000. She played a TV reporter in an episode of the first full series of Waking the Dead in 2001. She has been appearing on the Channel 5 (then known as Five) show The Wright Stuff since 2002 as a regular panellist, and on BBC Radio 4's Broadcasting House. She also presented Housebusters between 2003 and 2005 on Five. This was followed by the week-long documentary series Life Blood in 2004, also aired on Five, and the 2005 series of The Great Garden Challenge for Channel 4.

In January 2007, Ellis appeared on the BBC reality singing show Just the Two of Us partnered with Alexander O'Neal. Despite being 'saved' by Stewart Copeland on the first night, on 3 January 2007 she was the second celebrity to be eliminated, after judge CeCe Sammy described her as having the vocal characteristics of "a cat on speed". Ellis managed to show good humour in the face of the defeat, stating that she had had "fun, a lot of fun".

In May 2008, she appeared naked in a magazine in support of PETA and in June of the same year she won The Weakest Link Blue Peter celebrity charity special. She donated the winnings of £13,150 to Maggie's Centres, a cancer care charity.

In December 2009, Ellis narrated The Man Behind the Masquerade, a BBC documentary about Kit Williams. She was the voice of numerous Mexican gerbils in El Nombre, and has appeared on BBC's Antiques Road Trip with daughter Sophie; Bargain Hunt and Cash in the Attic.

In December 2010, Janet and her daughter Sophie appeared on Channel 4's The Million Pound Drop Live. Also shown on Channel 4 on 22 December 2010, Ellis competed in the Come Dine with Me celebrity Christmas special. The winner's prize of £1,000 was donated to charity. Ellis won, beating singer Tony Christie and actress Susie Amy into joint second place, with musician and actor Goldie bringing up the rear.

In January 2012 Ellis returned to her first love of acting by starring in a production of Alan Bennett's comedy play Green Forms for a week at the Tabard Theatre in Chiswick in order to raise money for Maggie's Centres.

=== 2014 – present ===
Following a long-held ambition to write fiction, Ellis attended a writing course in early 2014 run by the Curtis Brown agency. During the course she began writing her first novel, and after completing it her agent Gordon Wise submitted it to publishers under the pseudonym Jo Winter, the name of one of her grandmothers. A bidding war resulted in Ellis securing a six-figure two-book deal with Two Roads. The novel, The Butcher's Hook, was published under Ellis's own name in February 2016. She was included in The Observer's pick of the New Faces of Fiction 2016. In November 2016 the book was shortlisted for the 2016 Bad Sex in Fiction Award.

In 2018 Ellis wrote an opinion piece in The Guardian newspaper in which she characterised Blue Peter as offering "...a view of a world worth growing up in".

Ellis appeared in a play, Once Seen on Blue Peter, at the 2018 Edinburgh Festival. Her second novel, How It Was, was published in August 2019.

In 2025 Ellis was one of the judges of the 'Unpublished Novel' category of the Comedy Women in Print Prize.

In 2026, Ellis appeared at the Trans Mission benefit concert to promote the inclusive organisation Not In Our Name.

== Personal life ==
Ellis met her first husband, TV director Robin Bextor, at the age of 16 and married him in 1977 when she was 21. Their daughter Sophie was born in 1979. The couple separated during her time presenting Blue Peter. She met TV producer John Leach in 1986 and their son was born in 1987. After leaving Blue Peter, Ellis married Leach in 1988. He was managing director of TV production company Sunset+Vine, and they had a daughter. Leach died in July 2020, after having received a diagnosis of terminal cancer in November 2017.

She is the mother of three children: singer/songwriter Sophie Ellis-Bextor, musician and former child actor Jackson Ellis-Leach and art historian Martha Ellis-Leach.

Ellis is a member of the board of Lyric Theatre Hammersmith, a patron of Maggie's Centres, and a Council and Honorary Member of the National Youth Theatre. In December 2025, Humanists UK announced her as their new President, from January 2026. Ellis was appointed Member of the Order of the British Empire (MBE) in the 2016 Birthday Honours for services to charity and theatre.
