= Otis the Aardvark =

British television puppet

Otis the Aardvark as he appeared in November 2021.

Otis the Aardvark is a puppet of an aardvark that was a presenter on Children's BBC on British television. Otis mainly presented the afternoon links on BBC One alongside the main CBBC presenters. Otis was thought to be inspired by the 1992 Children's BBC idents which ended with a voice proclaiming "Tell that aardvark it's a wrap". These idents led to much speculation as to what the phrase meant. However, these idents were dropped just before the character of Otis appeared in late 1994.

Otis is said to have obtained his name from the OTIS lift in the CBBC building at BBC Television Centre. Dave Chapman was the puppeteer from 1994 to 1999. He also performed in a number of other Children's BBC programmes, notably The Cat from Dick & Dom in da Bungalow. When Fully Booked moved to Sundays on BBC Two, the extended Saturday CBBC was renamed Saturday Aardvark, with Otis being a key feature.

In 1996, he presented CBBC on Nickelodeon during school hours on Nickelodeon alongside Nick Jr. and his co-presenter was mascot Arthur the Ant in front of an ice cream parlour. He left in 1997 and was replaced by his cousin Marvin who presented from a shed until the strand finished on 16 July 1999. After leaving CBBC on 1 October 1999 Otis appeared on the puppet-based quiz show Clever Creatures until 2001. On that date the puppet was retired; it was announced that the character had gone to work at the BBC canteen. Otis was followed by another puppet called Emlyn the Gremlyn, who supported the live human presenters on the early afternoon links for a further two and a half years.

Otis subsequently made appearances on other CBBC shows including Insides Out and Live & Kicking. On 28 December 2007, Otis reappeared on a special 'puppet' edition of The Weakest Link for the BBC. On 1 April 2010, Otis appeared on the ITV2 show Celebrity Juice. Otis made another appearance along with other former presenters and puppets on 9 September 2015 to mark the 30th anniversary of CBBC. On 19 November 2021 Otis made an appearance amongst other famous puppets on BBC Children in Need on BBC1.
