= Ask Aspel =

1970s TV series

- Genre: Clip show
- Presented by: Michael Aspel
- Original language: English

Original release
- Network: BBC
- Release: 16 October 1970 – 21 July 1981

Ask Aspel is a British television series produced by the BBC and hosted by Michael Aspel. The format of the show, which first ran from 1970 until 1974, featured a well-known guest who answered questions sent in by viewers, posed by Aspel on their behalf. The questioning was interspersed by requests from viewers who would write in asking to see repeats of their favourite clips from BBC programmes. At least one clip featured the featured guest of the week. (Note: Affordable and practical video recorders were not generally available until the mid-1970s.) The show returned from 1976 until 1981.

== Guests ==
(known guests according to the Radio Times listings)

- 16 October 1970: Eric Morecambe & Ernie Wise
- 17 September 1971: Jack Wild
- 8 October 1971: Percy Thrower
- 15 October 1971: Ann Moore
- 22 October 1971: Cliff Richard
- 29 October 1971: Johnny Morris
- 5 November 1971: Leonard Nimoy
- 19 November 1971: Ian Johnson (Co-host Basil Brush)
- 26 November 1971: Terry Scott
- 3 December 1971: Jackie Stewart
- 10 December 1971: Stratford Johns
- 17 December 1971: Jimmy Edwards
- 31 December 1971: Compilation of the series
- 20 February 1972: Brian Rix
- 27 February 1972: Eric Morecambe & Ernie Wise (Possible repeat)
- 5 March 1972: Jon Pertwee
- 12 March 1972: Chay Blyth
- 26 March 1972: Tony Blackburn
- 21 July 1972: Patrick Moore
- 28 July 1972: Michael Bentine
- 4 August 1972: Lulu
- 11 August 1972: Ben Murphy
- 18 August 1972: Kenneth Williams
- 25 August 1972: Una Stubbs
- 1 September 1972: Peter Noone
- 8 September 1972: Basil D'Oliveira
- 1 October 1972: David Cassidy
- 8 October 1972: Bill Tidy
- 15 October 1972: Tim Rice
- 22 October 1972: Arthur Lowe
- 29 October 1972: Peter Cushing
- 19 November 1972: June Whitfield
- 3 December 1972: Ian McNaught-Davis
- 14 January 1973: Simon Ward
- 21 January 1973: Jeffery Boswall
- 28 January 1973: Morag Hood
- 4 February 1973: John Williams
- 11 February 1973: Miss World 1972 Belinda Green
- 18 February 1973: Richard Meade
- 25 February 1973: Gilbert O'Sullivan
- 23 September 1973: David Essex
- 30 September 1973: Geoffrey Boycott
- 14 October 1973: Antoinette Sibley & Anthony Dowell
- 21 October 1973: Showjumper Alison Dawes
- 28 October 1973: Michael Bond
- 4 November 1973: Donny Osmond, Jimmy Osmond & Alan Osmond
- 11 November 1973: Gordon Banks
- 18 November 1973: Bert Foord & Elizabeth Archard
- 2 December 1973: Deryck Guyler
- 9 December 1973: Roy Castle
- 17 March 1974: John Cleese
- 24 March 1974: Mike Hope & Albie Keen
- 31 March 1974: Nina Bawden
- 7 April 1974: Jimmy Hill
- 28 April 1974: Diver Beverley Williams
- 5 May 1974: Percy Edwards
- 12 May 1974: Richard Pitman
- 2 June 1974: David Cassidy (Possible repeat)
- 9 June 1974: Cilla Black
- 7 July 1974: Arthur Askey
- 14 July 1974: Tony Greig
- 28 July 1974: Highlights from the series
- 18 August 1976: Rick Wakeman
- 25 August 1976: Rod Hull & Emu
- 1 September 1976: James Hunt
- 8 September 1976: The Goodies
- 22 September 1976: Debbie Johnsey
- 3 August 1977: Rolf Harris
- 10 August 1977: Barry Sheene
- 17 August 1977: Eric Morecambe & Ernie Wise
- 24 August 1977: Zoo vet David Taylor
- 31 August 1977: Penelope Keith
- 14 September 1977: Lucinda Prior-Palmer
- 21 September 1977: Roger Moore
- 28 September 1977: All-round angler Ian Gillespie
- 5 October 1977: Roald Dahl
- 15 August 1978: Tim Rice
- 22 August 1978: Christopher Timothy
- 29 August 1977: James Burke
- 5 September 1978: Kate Bush
- 12 September 1978: Sonia Lannaman
- 26 September 1978: Clare Francis
- 15 May 1979: Isla St Clair
- 22 May 1979: Lena Zavaroni
- 29 May 1979: Peter Robinson of the Royal Society for the Protection of Birds
- 5 June 1979: Andrew Sachs
- 12 June 1979: Paul Darrow
- 19 June 1979: Tracy Austin
- 26 June 1979: Graham Bilbrough of Child
- 3 July 1979: Michael Palin
- 20 May 1980: Mark Hamill
- 27 May 1980: Trevor Brooking
- 3 June 1980: Andrew Lloyd Webber
- 10 June 1980: Geoff Capes
- 17 June 1980: Barbara Woodhouse
- 24 June 1980: BA Robertson
- 1 July 1980: Lynn Seymour
- 8 July 1980: Dan Maskell
- 15 July 1980: Lalla Ward
- 22 July 1980: BBC Young Musician of the Year, Nicholas Daniel
- 29 July 1980: Esther Rantzen
- 2 June 1981: Mark Wing-Davey
- 9 June 1981: Paul Daniels
- 16 June 1981: Toyah Willcox
- 23 June 1981: Wilf Lunn
- 30 June 1981: Lynn-Holly Johnson
- 7 July 1981: David Bellamy
- 14 July 1981: Linsey Macdonald
- 21 July 1981: Paul Nicholas
