= Insides Out =

Children's television game show

- Presented by: Mark Speight; Marsali Stewart; Otis the Aardvark
- Theme music composer: Richard Webb
- Country of origin: United Kingdom
- Original language: English
- No. of seasons: 2

Production
- Running time: 25 minutes

Original release
- Network: BBC
- Release: 15 September 1999 – 22 December 2000

Insides Out is a children's television game show. Its theme was the human body, and involved games that included body parts. A total of thirty episodes were made over two series, lasting from 15 September 1999 to 22 December 2000. It was presented by Mark Speight and Marsali Stewart, with co-presenter Otis the Aardvark.
