= Marcus Clarke (puppeteer) =

British puppeteer and voice actor

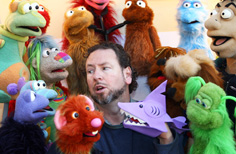
- Clarke talking with his puppets
- Born: Forest Gate, London, England
- Occupations: Actor, puppeteer
- Website: www.handsuppuppets.com

Marcus Clarke is a British puppeteer and voice actor. He is best known as the puppeteer and voice actor behind the BAFTA-winning CITV series Bookaboo and the principal puppeteer of Audrey II in the 1986 version of Little Shop of Horrors. Clarke has worked as a puppeteer in over 60 television series and has created a similar number of puppets. He was also a puppeteer and voice actor in two Muppet feature films and Who Framed Roger Rabbit.

== History ==
Marcus Clarke was born in Forest Gate, East London. He spent several years in Canada, Care and in NCH orphanages before being settled in West Bridgford, Nottinghamshire where he left West Bridgford School, his local comprehensive school with no qualifications. After a series of jobs behind the scenes in theatres, he became stage manager in a West End production of Little Shop Of Horrors, where he looked after Audrey II – the giant plant. He became interested in the art of puppetry. Clarke went on to audition for Jim Henson's TV Puppeteering Workshop, where he befriended Brian Henson.

Inspired in part by Henson, he and his partner, Helena Smee, formed a puppet creation company, "Hands Up Puppets", in 1986. To date, they have created more than 60 puppets and worked as puppeteers on a similar number of UK television series.

== Recent work ==
Bookaboo, 2009 BAFTA-award-winning kids' television series has Clarke puppeteering a "rock puppy" who is unable to play the drums before one of his friends has read him a story. Designed to back the 2008 National Year of Reading campaign, Bookaboo's friends are celebrities such as Meat Loaf and David Seaman.

Since 2009, Clarke has been working on new projects, teaching puppetry classes and working with charities. He created a short film with young people at Clayfields House, a secure children's home in Stapleford, Nottinghamshire. Clarke is also on the Board of Funny Wonders Inc, a community interest company, co-organisers of the Buxton Puppet Festival.

Since 2010 Clarke has also been an exhibiting contemporary artist. He created the art movement Puppet TV Graffiti to encompass his new art and craft of puppetisation and began creating and exhibiting puppetised contemporary artworks. Exhibitions and hangings include.

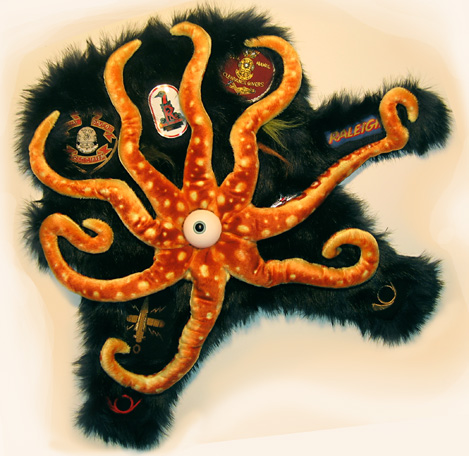
Marcus Clarke created this puppetised, PuppetTVGraffiti work for his DogHorse Coat art exhibition.

2015 The DogHorse Coat Art Exhibition. Floor 1 Gallery, Nottingham Central Library, 2–28 Feb 2015

2014 Homeless in the Puppetised City Art Exhibition, one man show, Nottingham. 13x works and video.

2014 Surface Gallery International Postcard Show 1x postcard work.

2012 FAB Fringe Arts Bath 2012. Mis-in-Formation. 3x works exhibited. Curator Diana Ali.

2011 Surface Gallery Nottingham 'Salon des Refuse's' 2x works exhibited.

1977 Mansfield College of Art. Various.

== Awards ==
Clarke has been nominated for and won a number of awards, including two BAFTAs for Pre-school Live Action. The first was in 2004 for PJ's Storytime and the second in 2009 for Bookaboo. Bookaboo went on to win Best Children's Programme at the Broadcast Awards. and its category at the Prix Jeuness International. Clarke was also Milky Cat in The Christmas Milkshake Show nominated in the same category in 2009. The young people in Clarke's puppet film, Clayfields House, won two writing awards from the Koestler Trust. He was listed as one of the "prominent people in Nottinghamshire" in 2010 at the Nottinghamshire Archives.

== Filmography ==
=== Film ===
Year	Role	Film
1985	Audrey II principal puppeteer	Little Shop Of Horrors
1988	Various puppeteering	Who Framed Roger Rabbit
1992	Additional Muppet performer (voice), various puppeteering	The Muppet Christmas Carol
1996	Additional Muppet performer (voice), various puppeteering	Muppet Treasure Island

=== Television ===
Year	Show	Character	Location/Company
1986	The Storyteller	Devil	The Jim Henson Company
1987	Monster Maker	Ultragorgan, little Gorgan	The Jim Henson Company
1987	Playbox	Dog and Cat	Ragdoll Productions
1989	Hotdog/Treasure Box	Hotdog	Thames Television
1990	Dappledown Farm	Dapple, Millie, Stubble	Clear Idea Television
1991	Tricky Business	Crabtree	BBC Television
1995	Children's Channel On-Air Presentation	Void the Android, Hopper, Dreeb	Starstream Productions
1996	WoW	Sid	ITV
1997	Venus on the Hard Drive	Venus	Fox Broadcasting Company
1997	Here's Johnny Chimes	Johnny Chimes	NBC
1998	Dottie and Buzz	Buzz	Prospect Pictures
1999	Tickle Patch and Friends (Series 1)	Patch	Channel 5
1999	Tenth Kingdom	Bird	Carnival Films
1999	Big Bag	Bag	Sesame Workshop
2002	SMarteenies	Doogy Dog	CBeebies
2000	The 10th Kingdom	Bird	
2003	The Softies	Cosy	Channel 5
2003	PJ's Bedtime	PJ	Playhouse Disney
2003	A House That's Just Like Yours	Dusty	Channel 5
2004	PJ's Storytime	PJ	Playhouse Disney
2005	Sandy and Mr. Flapper	Mr. Flapper	Two Hand Productions
2004	a Milkshake! Christmas	Patch	Channel 5
2005	Ant and Dec's Saturday Night Takeaway	Ant Vent	Granada Television
2006–2007	Tickle Patch and Friends 1 & 2	Patch	Two Hand Productions
2007–2008	The Milkshake! Show	Milky	Channel 5
2008, 2010	Bookaboo (series 1 and 2)	Bookaboo	ITV
2009	Producer Director and performer	Clayfields House Film	
2009	This Morning	Body Guard, Minder, Bouncer, Heavy	ITV
2009	Monkey	Salty Ticketmaster	Channel 5
2010	BBC Learning Zone	Puppetry Consultant	GameLab London
