= John Walton, Baron Walton of Detchant =

British neuroscientist, academic and life peer

The Right Honourable The Lord Walton of Detchant
- In a House of Lords debate in 2015.

Member of the House of Lords
- Lord Temporal
- Life peerage 24 July 1989 – 21 April 2016

President of the Royal Society of Medicine
- In office 1984–1986
- Preceded by: Sir James Watt
- Succeeded by: Sir Gordon Robson

Warden of Green College, Oxford
- In office 1983–1989

President of the General Medical Council
- In office 1982–1989

President of the British Medical Association
- In office 1980–1982

Personal details
- Born: John Nicolas Walton; 16 September 1922
- Died: 21 April 2016 (aged 93)
- Citizenship: United Kingdom
- Party: None (crossbencher)
- Education: University of Durham; Newcastle University
- Awards: Knight Bachelor (1979); Life Peer (1989); Member of the Norwegian Academy of Science and Letters

John Nicolas Walton, Baron Walton of Detchant (16 September 1922 – 21 April 2016) was a British neuroscientist, academic, and life peer who sat in the House of Lords as a crossbencher.

== Life ==
Walton qualified from Durham University College of Medicine and completed his MD at Newcastle Medical School. Walton was President of the British Medical Association (BMA) from 1980 to 1982, President of the General Medical Council (GMC) 1982-89 and President of the Royal Society of Medicine from 1984 to 1986. He was also appointed second Warden of Green College, Oxford in 1983, where he stayed until 1989. Green College merged with Templeton College, Oxford in 2008 to become Green Templeton College, located on the site that was previously Green College.

Having been knighted in 1979, Walton was created a life peer on 24 July 1989 as Baron Walton of Detchant, of Detchant in the County of Northumberland and sat as a crossbencher. In 1992 he became a member of the Science and Technology Committee, leaving in 1996, returning in 1997 and leaving again in 2001. From 1993 to 1994 he was Chair of the Medical Ethics committee. He was Secretary of the Rare Diseases Group from 2009 until his death.

He was a member of the Norwegian Academy of Science and Letters. He was Patron of The Little Foundation, Honorary Life President of the Muscular Dystrophy Campaign, Vice President of Parkinson's UK and Honorary Chairman of the United Kingdom Medical Students' Association (UKMSA).

He wrote an autobiography The Spice of Life: From Northumbria to World Neurology in 1993. It had 643 pages and, according to the review in the BMJ, “tells you absolutely everything [but] by the end of the book you really know nothing about him except that he has a colossal memory.”

== Death ==
Lord Walton of Detchant died on 21 April 2016, aged 93.

== Arms ==
Coat of arms of John Walton, Baron Walton of Detchant
| Coronet A Coronet of a Baron Crest Issuant from Clouds proper a Sea-Horse Argent the Piscine Part proper crined and finned Or holding between the forelegs a Cross Formy quadrate fitchy at the foot Purpure Escutcheon Paly wavy Argent and Gules a Castle triple towered Purpure on a Chief of the last three Crosses Formy quadrate Gold Supporters Dexter: a Boar Gold suspended from the neck by a Riband Purpure a Clarion pipes downwards Gules; Sinister: a Greyling Goose proper Motto DIEU DEFEND LE DROIT; French: GOD DEFEND THE RIGHT |
