= Eureka (British TV series) =

- Country of origin: United Kingdom
- No. of series: 4
- No. of episodes: 32

Original release
- Network: BBC1 / BBC2

Eureka (sometimes referred to as Eureka!) is a British educational television series about science and inventiveness which was originally produced and broadcast by the BBC from 1982 to 1986, and repeated until 1987. Devised and written by Clive Doig and Jeremy Beadle, the series told the stories behind the inventions of commonplace objects.

== Cast ==
Presented by Jeremy Beadle (series 1, 1982), then Sarah Greene (series 2, 1983), Paul McDowell (series 2 and 3, 1983 and 1985) and Wilf Lunn (series 4, 1986), the show featured an ensemble cast who re-enacted the moments of invention or performed humorous sketches to deliver key facts and information. Notable cast members included Sylvester McCoy, Simon Gipps-Kent, Bernard Holley, Madeline Smith, Mike Savage, Julia Binsted, Philip Fox and Jackie Clarke.

Each show also featured a segment showcasing a madcap and not always reliable invention by Wilf Lunn often to the bemusement of McCoy or another of the regular cast. In the fourth and final series, the format changed slightly and Lunn became the presenter, playing the Doctor of Alternative Invention at the Eureka Museum of Invention.
