= Jigsaw (British TV series) =

British children's TV series (1979–1984)

- Genre: Children's Game show
- Created by: Clive Doig
- Country of origin: United Kingdom
- Original language: English
- No. of series: 6
- No. of episodes: 50

Production
- Running time: 25 minutes

Original release
- Network: BBC1
- Release: 16 July 1979 – 15 June 1984

Related
- See It Saw It

Jigsaw is a BBC show aimed at children between the ages of 4 and 7 that combined elements of puzzle solving and entertainment, which was broadcast from 16 July 1979 until 15 June 1984. It was awarded a BAFTA in 1981.

Written and directed by Clive Doig, the show was presented by mime artist Adrian Hedley, Janet Ellis and "Jigg" - a giant floating orange jigsaw piece, voiced by John Leeson later replaced by Tommy Boyd then Howard Stableford.

Ellis left in 1983 to become a Blue Peter presenter, at which point she was replaced by Dot, played by Julia Binsted - an anthropomorphism of the "cursor dot" (the dot made by the raster-scanning beam in the analogue CRT television sets of the time).

Throughout the show, the presenters and supporting characters came together to solve a number of puzzles; these puzzles would then contribute to one larger conundrum that would be revealed at the end of the show. The viewer was encouraged to take part and solve the puzzles at home.

The theme music for 'Jigsaw' was composed by Martin Cook and Richard Denton (also responsible for the theme for Tomorrow's World) using a mixture of electronic keyboards and musique concrète. Cook would later compose a revised theme on his own. The theme used for the Noseybonk segments was "A Hippo Called Hubert," composed by Joe Griffiths and also used in Kentucky Fried Chicken's Charlie Chickenhawk and Frederick Fox advertising in Australia between 1984 and 1987.

The titles were made by hand animated stop frame techniques featuring objects which began with the letters JIGSAW. Early titles featured Hedley miming objects.

== Cast and Characters ==
Featured supporting cast included Paul Clayton, Biggum the giant (played by Leeson) and Wilf Lunn who appeared as a mad inventor. Other unusual characters included Pterry, a puppet Pterodactyl (operated by Joe Barton); Cid Sleuth (played by David Cleveland), a Sherlock Holmes-looking bumbling detective plagued by a mysterious burglar (David Wyatt); Hector The Hedgehog; and the O-Men (Sylvester McCoy and David Rappaport), a pair of hapless superheroes summoned by saying any six consecutive words containing a double-O (even the same word repeated six times counted once, albeit inadvertently - Dot said 'coo' four times imitating a pigeon, then Adrian mocked her attempt, saying it twice more to trigger the summon).

== Noseybonk ==
Noseybonk
- Jigsaw character
- First appearance: Jigsaw Season 2 (May 20th 1980)
- Last appearance: TV Years magazine advert (May 29th 2019)
- Portrayed by: Adrian Hedley

In-universe information
- Full name: Mr. Noseybonk
- Gender: Male
- Occupation: Mime artist
- Nationality: British

Arguably the most memorable character was Noseybonk (known later as Mr. Noseybonk), who joined in series 2. Noseybonk was performed by Hedley in a dinner suit and a white face mask with a prominent nose and toothy grin. This last character has proved the most enduring due to him allegedly terrifying children as much as amusing them. Stuart Ashen would take inspiration from this fact and create a series of Noseybonk Returns YouTube videos in 2008, which led to him appearing on Charlie Brooker's Screenwipe portraying the character. Even as recent as December 2025, British actor Mitchel Corrado announced a parody horror series "The Noseybonk Incident" to release in early 2026, bringing new life to the character 40 years after his original appearance. Noseybonk also inspired Mr. Chuckleteeth in the X-Files episode Familiar.

Mr. Chuckleteeth was actually inspired by an old British kids TV show called Jigsaw. There's a character in Jigsaw called Mr. Noseybonk. He kind of looks like Mr. Chuckleteeth a little bit, so that was the inspiration for me when I was writing the character. It was the starting point for the design, but we really made it our own thing. My inkling is that it might also have been the inspiration behind Jigsaw, the character in the Saw films.

== Transmissions ==
Series	Start date	End date	Episodes
1	16 July 1979	20 August 1979	6
2	20 May 1980	24 June 1980	6
3	21 September 1981	14 December 1981	13
4	10 January 1983	21 February 1983	7
5	17 January 1984	21 February 1984	6
6	5 April 1984	15 June 1984	12
