= Muscular Dystrophy UK =

UK nonprofit organization

== About ==
Muscular Dystrophy UK
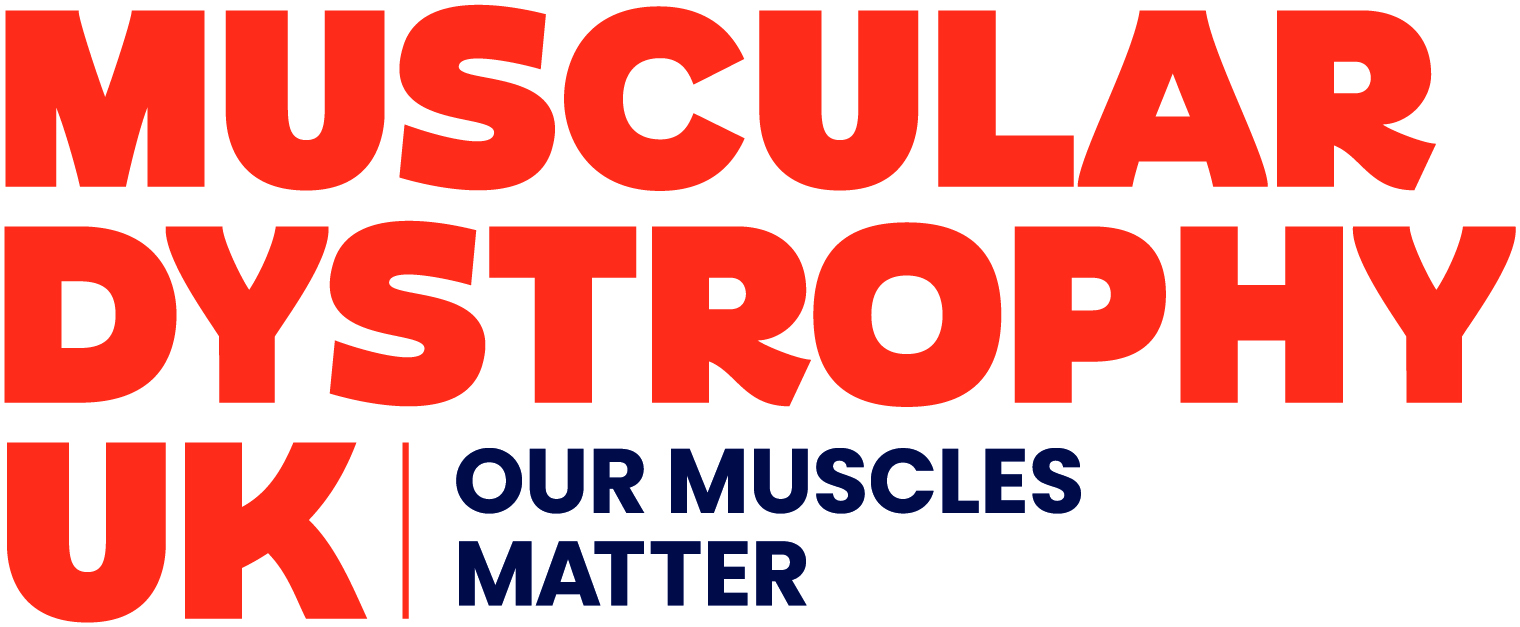
- Formation: 1959
- Registration no.: 205395
- Purpose: Medical research, patient support
- Headquarters: Southwark, London, United Kingdom
- President: Gabby Logan
- Website: https://www.musculardystrophyuk.org/
- Formerly called: Muscular Dystrophy Group Muscular Dystrophy Campaign

Muscular Dystrophy UK (MDUK) is a UK charity focusing on muscular dystrophy and related conditions. It works on behalf of those with over 60 muscle wasting and weakening conditions. For over 60 years, Muscular Dystrophy UK has been building a community of individuals living with muscle wasting or weakening conditions, families and carers, scientists, health care professionals, supporters, volunteers, and donors. Making advances that would have been unthinkable just ten years ago.

== History ==
The charity was founded in 1959 (then known as the Muscular Dystrophy Group and later as the Muscular Dystrophy Campaign) by Lord Walton of Detchant, to help families and children living with muscular dystrophy, and to raise money to fund research to find the causes of and cures for muscular dystrophy.

Since then, diagnosis of the different forms of muscular dystrophy and related muscle conditions has improved hugely and the charity now provides support for more than 60 different muscle-wasting conditions, as well as funding many key research developments.

== High Profile Supporters ==
Gabby Logan became President of the charity in 2018, taking over from Sue Barker who had held the role since 2004. Gabby is an active supporter, attending many charity events including the charity's annual national conferences and the celebrity sports quiz at Lord's Cricket Ground. In 2024 she took on the London Landmarks Half Marathon for the charity raising over £5,000

Lord Attenborough served as the charity's President for 30 years, until 2002, when he became an Honorary Life President. Lord Attenborough remained an inspirational supporter of the charity and the Richard Attenborough Fellowship Fund has been established to honour his commitment to world-class research.

Sir Alex Ferguson is a long-standing Vice President of the charity having been introduced to MDUK by a friend whose son was affected by the condition. He has been involved in fundraising and events for over ten years.

Prince Philip became Patron of the charity in 1966. Introduced to the charity by Lord Attenborough, he remained as Royal Patron until his sad passing in April 2021.

== Fundraising ==
The majority of the charity's work is funded by voluntary activity often carried about by those that are affected by muscular dystrophy.

Key events for the charity are the Microscope Ball which will be in its 40th year in 2024, an event attend by more than 700 members of the commercial property industry; Peddle, Paddle Peak – the charity's own off-road challenge event and the Town and Gown 10K series which takes place in Oxford and Cambridge each year.

In 2024 Muscular Dystrophy UK won funding from Project Giving Back to have a garden at the RHS Chelsea Flower Show. The garden at RHS Chelsea Flower show was designed by award winning designer, Ula Maria and based on the theme of Shirin-yoku the Japanese practice of Forest Bathing.

The garden won the prestigious overall Best Show Garden and a Gold Medal in the Show Garden category
