= See It Saw It =

British children's game show

- Genre: Children's game show
- Created by: Clive Doig
- Presented by: Mark Speight
- Starring: Natasha Collins; Kate Crossley; Philip Fox
- Country of origin: United Kingdom
- Original language: English
- No. of series: 3
- No. of episodes: 39 (inc. 8 specials)

Production
- Running time: 25 minutes
- Production company: Brechin

Original release
- Network: BBC One
- Release: 6 January 1999 – 26 March 2001

Related
- Jigsaw

See It Saw It is a children's game show about a king who rules over the kingdom of "Much Jollity-on-the-Mirth". It ran from 6 January 1999 to 26 March 2001. The programme was filmed entirely in a studio, with an audience of children, who at various points in the show would be asked an observation question by the King, which they would answer by climbing on board a giant see saw.

The majority answer would be indicated by which way the see saw tipped. The show's main catchphrase was "did you see it?" asked by the king, to which the audience would shout back, "we saw it!".

The show was created and produced by Clive Doig, and most of the cast had also appeared in previous shows created by Doig: Mark Speight and Philip Fox were both part of the supporting cast in the GMTV programme Eat Your Words, while both Sylvester McCoy and Julia Binsted had long histories of working with Doig, both having appeared in the classic series Jigsaw in the 1980s.

The only newcomer in the main cast was Natasha Collins as the Jester See. Following a serious accident in 2000, Collins was unavailable for subsequent series, and the role was completely taken over by Kate Crossley.

== Transmissions ==
Natasha Collins (left) as jester See and Mark Speight as the King.

=== Series ===
Series	Start date	End date	Episodes
1	6 January 1999	31 March 1999	13
2	5 January 2000	30 March 2000	13
3	3 January 2001	26 March 2001	13

=== Compilations ===
Date
27 December 1999
28 December 1999
29 December 1999
30 December 1999
27 December 2000
28 December 2000
29 December 2000
2 January 2001
