= Natasha Collins =

English actress and model (1976–2008)

- Born: Natasha Louise Collins; 7 September 1976; Luton, Bedfordshire, England
- Died: 3 January 2008 (aged 31); St John's Wood, London, England
- Cause of death: Drug overdose
- Resting place: Edmonton Cemetery, Edmonton, London, England
- Occupations: Model; actress
- Years active: 1998–2008
- Partner: Mark Speight (2005–2008)

Natasha Louise Collins (7 September 1976 – 3 January 2008) was an English actress and model. Following a car crash that curtailed her career, she fatally overdosed on cocaine, which Mark Speight, her fiancé, was initially suspected of supplying, but he was not charged. He later killed himself on 7 April 2008 after experiencing severe depression brought on by her death.

== Career ==
Educated at St Michael's Catholic Grammar School in Finchley, north London, Collins initially worked as a model, and was still represented by Ugly Rage Models at the time of her death. Collins first appeared on television in the Brechin Productions' children's show See It Saw It, in which she played See, one of two court jesters in the court of the King, played by Mark Speight.

Trying to break into more adult television, she later appeared in Hallmark/NBC's The 10th Kingdom and ITV1's Real Women. She also featured in a small number of episodes of the BBC emergency services programme 999 Lifesavers, and one episode of the popular children's television series ChuckleVision as the Spanish Princess. She also worked in film and theatre, as well as presenting corporate videos.

In 2000, Collins was cast in a main role in the Channel 4 show Hollyoaks, but later the same day was involved in a serious car crash. The incident left her with seizures that curtailed her career. Whilst recovering, she began dating Speight, and the couple became engaged in Barbados in 2005.

== Death ==
At 13:20 on 3 January 2008, police were called to the North West London home of Collins and her fiancé, television presenter Mark Speight, where Collins was found dead in a bath. Speight was arrested on suspicion of murder and supplying Class A drugs, and was bailed to return to the police station for questioning in early-February.

The subsequent postmortem examination proved to be inconclusive, requiring additional toxicology tests. The inquest, opened on 8 January 2008, heard that the death was not thought to be suspicious, but that it was "subject to further investigation".

On 2 April 2008, the coroner recorded a verdict of death by misadventure after Collins was found with scalds covering about 60% of her body and a "'very significant' amount of cocaine in her system at the time".

Speight had been arrested immediately following Collins' death, but was not charged with any offence. Speight later committed suicide; his body was found by police on the roof of MacMillan House next to London's Paddington Railway Station on 13 April 2008. Suicide notes written by Speight were found, in which he described how he felt that he could no longer live without Collins.

Collins is buried at Edmonton Cemetery in Edmonton, north London, England.
