= 1940 in animation =

Events in 1940 in animation.

== Events ==
=== January ===
- January 13: Tex Avery's The Early Worm Gets the Bird is first released, produced by Leon Schlesinger Productions.

=== February ===
- February 10: Puss Gets the Boot, the first Tom and Jerry cartoon, is first released by William Hanna, Joseph Barbera and Rudolf Ising and produced by MGM. It marks the debut of Tom Cat (named "Jasper" in this cartoon), Jerry Mouse (named "Jinx" in this cartoon) and Mammy Two Shoes.
- February 23: Pinocchio is first released, directed by Ben Sharpsteen and Hamilton Luske, produced by Walt Disney Animation Studios. It marks the debut of Jiminy Cricket, who will appear in various other Disney-related media.
- February 29: 12th Academy Awards: The Ugly Duckling, produced by Walt Disney Animation Studios, directed by Jack Cutting and Clyde Geronimi, wins the Academy Award for Best Animated Short Film.

=== March ===
- March 2: Chuck Jones' Elmer's Candid Camera is first released, produced by Leon Schlesinger Productions. This short marks the official debut of Elmer Fudd, and also stars the prototype Bugs Bunny.
- March 15: Jack King's Donald Duck cartoon The Riveter premieres, produced by Walt Disney Animation Studios. Also starring Pete.
- March 16: Tex Avery's Cross Country Detours is first released, produced by Leon Schlesinger Productions.

=== April ===
- April 5: Jack King's Donald Duck cartoon Donald's Dog Laundry premieres, produced by Walt Disney Animation Studios. Also starring Pluto.
- April 13: Tex Avery's The Bear's Tale is first released, produced by Leon Schlesinger Productions.

=== May ===
- May 16: Wagorō Arai's Madame Butterfly's Illusion premieres.
- May 18: Friz Freleng's Porky Pig and Daffy Duck cartoon You Ought to Be in Pictures produced by Leon Schlesinger Productions, is released, it is notable for its mix of live-action/animation and the earliest cartoon to portray Daffy as greedy and self-centered, Leon Schlesinger appears as himself.
- May 25: Tex Avery's A Gander at Mother Goose is first released, produced by Leon Schlesinger Productions.

=== June ===
- June 7: Jack King's Donald Duck cartoon Mr. Duck Steps Out, produced by Walt Disney Animation Studios, premieres, in which Donald goes out dancing with Daisy Duck (In her first appearance), only to be bothered by Huey, Dewey, and Louie.
- June 22:
  - Rudolf Ising's The Milky Way premieres, produced by MGM's Cartoon Studio.
  - Tex Avery's Circus Today is first released, produced by Leon Schlesinger Productions.

=== July ===
- July 19: Riley Thomson's first Donald Duck cartoon Put-Put Troubles premieres, produced by Walt Disney Animation Studios. Also starring Pluto.
- July 27: Tex Avery's A Wild Hare premieres, produced by Leon Schlesinger Productions, marks the official debut of Bugs Bunny. It is also the first time Bugs asks: "What's up, Doc?" and Elmer Fudd asking people to be very quiet, because he's hunting "wabbits".

=== August ===
- August 9: Jack King's Donald Duck cartoon Donald's Vacation premieres, produced by Walt Disney Animation Studios.
- August 24:
  - Bob Clampett's Porky Pig short Patient Porky, produced by Leon Schlesinger Productions, premieres. This marks the final appearance of the Prototype version of Bugs Bunny as he is now becoming an official character.
  - Tex Avery's Ceiling Hero is first released, produced by Leon Schlesinger Productions.

=== September ===
- September 20: Jack King's Donald Duck cartoon Window Cleaners premieres, produced by Walt Disney Animation Studios. Also starring Pluto.

=== October ===
- October 12: Tex Avery's Holiday Highlights premieres, produced by Leon Schlesinger Productions.

=== November ===
- November 1: Clyde Geronimi's Mickey Mouse and Pluto cartoon Mr. Mouse Takes a Trip, produced by Walt Disney Animation Studios, premieres.
- November 2: Bob Clampett's The Sour Puss premieres, produced by Leon Schlesinger Productions. It marks the first time the Acme Corporation running gag is used.
- November 9: Tex Avery's Wacky Wild Life premieres, produced by Leon Schlesinger Productions.
- November 13: Samuel Armstrong, James Algar, Bill Roberts, Paul Satterfield, Ben Sharpsteen, David D. Hand, Hamilton Luske, Jim Handley, Ford Beebe, T. Hee, Norman Ferguson and Wilfred Jackson's Fantasia, produced by the Walt Disney Animation Studios, is first released. It becomes a box office flop, received mixed reviews, but will gain cult film status decades later.
- November 25: Walter Lantz's animated short Knock Knock premieres, produced by Walter Lantz Productions which marks the debut of Woody Woodpecker.

=== December ===
- December 7: Tex Avery's Of Fox and Hounds premieres, produced by Leon Schlesinger Productions, in which Willoughby the Dog makes his debut. It also marks the first use of "Which way did he go, George? Which way did he go?" in an animated cartoon.
- December 13: Jack King's Donald Duck cartoon Fire Chief premieres, produced by Walt Disney Animation Studios. Also starring Huey, Dewey, and Louie.

=== Specific date unknown ===
- John Halas and Joy Batchelor establish the animated studio Halas and Batchelor.
- Mary Ellen Bute's Tarantella premieres.
- The Jam Handy Organization makes the live-action educational short A Case of Spring Fever to promote springs and their importance. The film features some animation. Five decades later, it would gain cult fame after featuring in the TV show Mystery Science Theater 3000.
- British radio comedian Harry Hemsley makes an animated advertising short where the characters from his radio show and comic strip Ovaltiney's Concert Party appear, all voiced by himself.

== Films released ==
- February 7 – Pinocchio (United States)
- November 13 – Fantasia (United States)

== Births ==
=== January ===
- January 1: Ippei Kuri, Japanese manga artist (Science Ninja Team Gatchaman (also known as Battle of the Planets), (Speed Racer), co-founder of Tatsunoko Production), (d. 2023).
- January 19: Linda Sorenson, Canadian voice actress (voice of Pretty Bit in Popples, Fifi in Beverly Hills Teens, Love-a-lot Bear in Care Bears, Miss Grundy in The New Archies, Demeter in Mythic Warriors, Hetty King in Anne of Green Gables: The Animated Series, Old Woman in Barbie & the Diamond Castle, Old Lady Munson in Kid vs. Kat).
- January 22: John Hurt, English actor (voice of Aragorn in The Lord of the Rings, Hazel in Watership Down, Snitter in The Plague Dogs, the Horned King in The Black Cauldron), (d. 2017).
- January 27: James Cromwell, American actor (voice of the Colonel in Spirit: Stallion of the Cimarron, Robert Callaghan / Yokai in Big Hero 6 and Big Hero 6: The Series, Alfred Pennyworth in Merry Little Batman, Zefram Cochrane in the Star Trek: Lower Decks episode "Grounded").

=== February ===
- February 2:
  - David Jason, English actor and comedian (voice of the title characters in Danger Mouse and Count Duckula, Mr. Toad in The Wind in the Willows, and subsequent TV series).
  - Morgan Lofting, American actress (voice of the Baroness in G.I. Joe: A Real American Hero, Fistina and Yetta in Ben 10: Omniverse, Aunt May and Black Cat in Spider-Man, Moonracer and Firestar in The Transformers), (d. 2024).
- February 4: John Schuck, American actor (voice of Reptar and Leo in the Rugrats episode "Reptar on Ice", Arms Akimbo in the Freakazoid! episode "In Arm's Way", Wally and Announcer in the Hey Arnold! episode "Ransom").
- February 11: Lord Tim Hudson, English DJ and voice actor (voice of Dizzy in The Jungle Book, Hit Cat in The Aristocats), (d. 2019).
- February 21: John Lewis, American politician and civil rights activist (voiced himself in the Arthur episode "Arthur Takes a Stand"), (d. 2020).
- February 23: Natalya Bogomolova, Russian animator (Winnie-the-Pooh, The Blue Bird, Alice's Birthday), (d. 2023).
- February 27: Bill Hunter, Australian actor (voice of Phillip Sherman in Finding Nemo, Bubo in Legend of the Guardians: The Owls of Ga'Hoole), (d. 2011).
- February 28: Mario Andretti, Italian-born American former racing driver (voice of himself in Cars, Indianapolis Motor Speedway Traffic Director in Turbo, Mario Mousedretti in the Mickey and the Roadster Racers episode "Mickey's Speed Grand Prix").

=== March ===
- March 1: Robert Grossman, American painter, caricaturist, sculptor, filmmaker, poster designer, comics artist, cartoonist and animator (Jimmy The C), (d. 2018).
- March 7: Tsunehiko Kamijō, Japanese actor (voice of Mamma Autoto Boss in Porco Rosso, Gonza in Princess Mononoke, Kasshu in Doraemon: Nobita's Great Adventure in the South Seas, Chichiyaku in Spirited Away, Japanese dub voice of Sebastian in The Little Mermaid, Colonel Kit Coyote in Go Go Gophers), (d. 2025).
- March 10: Chuck Norris, American martial artist and actor (voiced himself in Karate Kommandos), (d. 2026).
- March 11: William Callaway, American voice actor (voice of Aquaman and Bizarro in Super Friends, Clumsy Smurf in The Smurfs, Square Bear in Help!... It's the Hair Bear Bunch, Beach Head in G.I. Joe: A Real American Hero, Comet Guy in Darkwing Duck).
- March 26: James Caan, American actor (voice of Tim Lockwood in Cloudy with a Chance of Meatballs and Cloudy with a Chance of Meatballs 2, the Bamboo Cutter in The Tale of the Princess Kaguya, himself in The Simpsons episode "All's Fair in Oven War", and the Family Guy episode "Something, Something, Something, Dark Side"), (d. 2022).
- March 27: Austin Pendleton, American actor, playwright, theatre director, and instructor (voice of Gurgle in Finding Nemo and Finding Dory).
- March 30: Paul Driessen, Dutch film director, animator and writer (The Killing of an Egg, The Boy Who Saw the Iceberg).
- March 31: Patrick Leahy, American politician and attorney (voice of Territorial Governor in the Batman: The Animated Series episode "Showdown").

=== April ===
- April 2: Penelope Keith, English actress (voice of Nana Poo-Poo in The Secret Show episode "Commando Babies", Queen Bee in the Tinga Tinga Tales episode "Why Bees Sing"), (d. 2026).
- April 4: Yukiko Takayama, Japanese screenwriter (Monarch: The Big Bear of Tallac), (d. 2023).
- April 15: Thea White, American voice actress (voice of Muriel Bagge in Courage the Cowardly Dog and Straight Outta Nowhere: Scooby-Doo! Meets Courage the Cowardly Dog), (d. 2021).
- April 16: Zoila Quiñones, Mexican actress (Latin American dub voice of Sue in Pac-Man, Nancy in Shazzan), (d. 2024).
- April 17: Chuck Menville, American animator and writer (Hanna-Barbera, Tiny Toon Adventures, Batman: The Animated Series), (d. 1992).
- April 21: George DiCenzo, American actor (voice of Hordak in She-Ra: Princess of Power, the title character in Blackstar, Otar in Galtar and the Golden Lance, Lou Albano in Hulk Hogan's Rock 'n' Wrestling, Ubu in the Batman: The Animated Series episode "Avatar", Commander in the Animaniacs episode "Puttin' on the Blitz"), (d. 2010).

=== May ===
- May 4: Seán Barrett, English actor (voice of Asterix in The Twelve Tasks of Asterix, Melchoir in Lapitch the Little Shoemaker, Roly the Pineapple in The Fruities, additional voices in Asterix and the Big Fight).
- May 5: Lance Henriksen, American actor (voice of Kerchak in the Tarzan franchise, Lockdown in Transformers: Animated, Brainiac in Superman: Brainiac Attacks, General Tesler in Tron: Uprising, Mobius Quint in the Super Robot Monkey Team Hyperforce Go! episode "Hunt for the Citadel of Bone", Kobra Leader in the Static Shock episode "Future Shock").
- May 8: Emilio Delgado, Mexican-American actor (portrayed Luis in Sesame Street, voice of the King in The Bravest Knight, the Ram in the Between the Lions episode "The Ram in the Pepper Patch"), (d. 2022).
- May 9: James L. Brooks, American director, producer and screenwriter (The Simpsons).
- May 10: Taurean Blacque, American actor (voice of Roscoe in Oliver & Company), (d. 2022).
- May 20: Gary Reineke, American-Canadian actor (voice of Sheerky in The Neverending Story episode "End of Time"), (d. 2024).

=== June ===
- June 1: René Auberjonois, American actor (voice of Chef Louis in The Little Mermaid franchise, Marsupilami, and the House of Mouse episode "Goofy's Menu Magic", the Skull in The Last Unicorn, DeSaad in Super Friends, Mark Desmond in Young Justice, Azmuth in Ben 10: Omniverse, Ebony Maw in Avengers Assemble, Pepe Le Pew in The Looney Tunes Show, Odo in Stewie Griffin: The Untold Story), (d. 2019).
- June 6: Richard Paul, American voice actor (voice of Sonny in Coonskin), (d. 1998).
- June 7:
  - Monica Evans, English actress (voice of Abigail Gabble in The Aristocats, Maid Marian in Robin Hood).
  - Tom Jones, Welsh singer (voice of Theme Song Guy in The Emperor's New Groove, himself in The Simpsons episode "Marge Gets a Job" and the Duck Dodgers episode "Talent Show A Go-Go", performed the theme song of Duck Dodgers).
- June 15:
  - Michael Barrier, American animation historian.
  - Aron Kincaid, American actor (voice of Killer Croc in Batman: The Animated Series, Sky Lynx in The Transformers, the Nerdator in the Freakazoid! episode "Nerdator", Fritter O'Way in the DuckTales episode "Down and Out in Duckburg"), (d. 2011).
- June 16: Thea White, American voice actress (voice of Muriel Bagge in Courage the Cowardly Dog and Straight Outta Nowhere: Scooby-Doo! Meets Courage the Cowardly Dog), (d. 2021).
- June 20: John Mahoney, English actor (voice of Preston Whitmore in Atlantis: The Lost Empire and Atlantis: Milo's Return, General Rogard in The Iron Giant, Papi in Kronk's New Groove, Robert Terwilliger in The Simpsons episode "Funeral for a Fiend"), (d. 2018).
- June 28: Marilyn Lightstone, Canadian actress and writer (voice of Sonja and Grandma in Heathcliff, Crasher in Challenge of the GoBots, Alice Mitchell and Martha Wilson in Dennis the Menace).
- June 30: Félix Nakamura, Peruvian animator and film director, (d. 2000).

=== July ===
- July 6: Milan Blažeković, Croatian animator (The Elm-Chanted Forest, The Magician's Hat, Lapitch the Little Shoemaker), (d. 2019).
- July 7: Ringo Starr, English musician, singer, songwriter and actor (voice of Narrator/Father in The Point!, the Narrator in seasons 1 and 2 of Thomas & Friends, Fibonacci Sequins in The Powerpuff Girls: Dance Pantsed, himself in The Simpsons episode "Brush with Greatness").
- July 11: Toby Bluth, American illustrator, theatrical director, animator and background artist (Walt Disney Animation Studios, Hanna-Barbera, Banjo the Woodpile Cat, Mickey, Donald, Goofy: The Three Musketeers) and brother of Don Bluth, (d. 2013).
- July 13:
  - Patrick Stewart, English actor (voice of Number One and Homer's unnamed co-worker in The Simpsons, Avery Bullock in American Dad!, Adventure in The Pagemaster, Seti I in The Prince of Egypt, King Goobot in Jimmy Neutron: Boy Genius, Mr. Woolensworth in Chicken Little, the Great Prince of the Forest in Bambi II, Max Winters in TMNT, Poop in The Emoji Movie, Major in The Plague Dogs, Jean-Luc Picard and himself in Family Guy, English dub voice of Lord Yupa in Nausicaä of the Valley of the Wind), (d. 2026).
  - Jim Danforth, American stop-motion animator (The Gumby Show, Davey and Goliath, Jack the Giant Killer, The Wonderful World of the Brothers Grimm, When Dinosaurs Ruled the Earth, Clash of the Titans).
- July 18: James Brolin, American actor (voice of Emperor Zurg in Lightyear).
- July 22: Alex Trebek, Canadian-American game show host and television personality (voice of Alan Quebec in the Rugrats episode "Game Show Didi", Announcer in The Magic School Bus episode "Shows and Tells", Alex Lebek in the Arthur episode "Arthur and the Big Riddle", voiced himself in The Simpsons episodes "Miracle on Evergreen Terrace" and "Penny-Wiseguys", the Pepper Ann episodes "Unhappy Campers" and "The Finale", the Family Guy episode "I Take Thee Quagmire", and the Scooby-Doo and Guess Who? episode "Total Jeopardy!"), (d. 2020).
- July 28: Philip Proctor, American comedian and actor (voice of Electro in Spider-Man, Charles' Father in The Tick, Howard DeVille in Rugrats, King Gerard in The Smurfs, Willy Wombat in Taz-Mania).

=== August ===
- August 1: Co Hoedeman, Dutch-Canadian animator (The Sand Castle, Ludovic: The Snow Gift, Winter Days), (d. 2025).
- August 3: Martin Sheen, American actor (voice of Sly Sludge in Captain Planet and the Planeteers, Gaspar in The 3 Wise Men, Emilio in Wrinkles, Grandfather James Alden in The Boxcar Children and The Boxcar Children: Surprise Island, Sgt. Seymour Skinner in The Simpsons episode "The Principal and the Pauper").
- August 26: Don LaFontaine, American voice actor (voice of the Narrator in Santa vs. the Snowman 3D, the Announcer in Fillmore!, FOX Announcer and Narrator in the Family Guy episodes "Screwed the Pooch" and "Brian Sings and Swings", Movie Trailer Announcer in the American Dad! episode "Tearjerker", Movie VO Voice in the Phineas and Ferb episode "The Chronicles of Meap"), (d. 2008).
- August 27: Sonny Sharrock, American jazz guitarist and composer (Space Ghost Coast to Coast), (d. 1994).

=== September ===
- September 5: Raquel Welch, American singer and actress (voice of Shelly Millstone in Hollyrock-a-Bye Baby and La Madrasta in Happily Ever After: Fairy Tales for Every Child), (d. 2023).
- September 8: Jack Prelutsky, American poet (voiced himself in the Arthur episode "I'm a Poet").
- September 11: Miroslawa Krajewska, Polish actress (Polish dub voice of Granny in the Looney Tunes franchise, Katara in The Legend of Korra), (d. 2023).
- September 12: Skip Hinnant, American actor (voice of Fritz the Cat in Fritz the Cat and The Nine Lives of Fritz the Cat, Sunny the Easter Bunny in The Easter Bunny is Comin' To Town, Pogo in I Go Pogo, provided additional voices for My Little Pony), (d. 2026).
- September 19: Paul Williams, American composer, singer, songwriter, and actor (wrote and sang "Flying Dreams" in The Secret of NIMH, voice of Penguin in the DC Animated Universe, Brainiac in Superman: Red Son, Garen in The Pirates of Dark Water, Hierophant in Adventure Time, Professor Williams in the Dexter's Laboratory episode "Just an Old Fashioned Lab Song").
- September 25:
  - Roberto Del Giudice, Italian voice actor (dub voice of Arsène Lupin III in Lupin III), (d. 2007).
  - Eva Švankmajerová, Czech painter, ceramist, poet, animator, designer, director and producer; also the wife of Jan Švankmajer, (d. 2005).

=== October ===
- October 1: Richard Corben, American animator, illustrator, comics writer, comics artist (Neverwhere, wrote the script for the Den segment in Heavy Metal) and colorist, (d. 2020).
- October 9:
  - John Lennon, English musician, singer-songwriter and member of The Beatles (Yellow Submarine), (d. 1980).
  - Stephen Mendillo, American actor (voice of Boyer in The Invincible Iron Man), (d. 2025).
- October 13: Dave Smith, American archivist (founder of the Walt Disney Archives) and author (Disney A to Z), (d. 2019).
- October 16: Barry Corbin, American actor (voice of Santa Claus in The Looney Tunes Show episode "A Christmas Carol", Fire Chief in the King of the Hill episode "A Fire-fighting We Will Go", Uncle Sammy in the Life with Louie episode "The Fourth Thursday in November").
- October 18: Cynthia Weil, American songwriter (wrote "Somewhere Out There" from An American Tail), (d. 2023).
- October 19: Michael Gambon, Irish-English actor (voice of Franklin Bean in Fantastic Mr. Fox, Badger in The Wind in the Willows, Master Martin in A Monkey's Tale, Ghost of Christmas Present in Christmas Carol: The Movie), (d. 2023).

=== November ===
- November 6: Jack Ong, American actor, writer, activist and marketing professional (voice of Chinese Fisherman in The Simpsons episode "Das Bus"), (d. 2017).
- November 15: Ulf Pilgaard, Danish actor (voice of Krabben in Help! I'm a Fish), (d. 2024).
- November 21: Claudio Biern Boyd, Spanish television writer, director and producer (co-founder of BRB Internacional), (d. 2022).
- November 22:
  - Terry Gilliam, American-born English animator (Monty Python's Flying Circus).
  - Eiichi Yamamoto, Japanese animation director and screenwriter (Kimba the White Lion, Cleopatra, Belladonna of Sadness), (d. 2021).
- November 27: John Alderton, English retired actor (voice of the Narrator and other various characters in Little Miss and Fireman Sam, the title character and God in the Testament: The Bible in Animation episode "Jonah").
- November 29: Chuck Mangione, American flugelhornist (voiced himself in King of the Hill) (d. 2025).

=== December ===
- December 1: Minori Matsushima, Japanese voice actress (voice of Dororo in Dororo, Sayaka Yumi in Mazinger Z, Hiroshi Ichikawa in The Monster Kid, Candice White Adley in Candy Candy, Alexandria Meat in Kinnikuman, Tsuru in One Piece), (d. 2022).
- December 11: Maggy Reno Hurchalla, American environmental activist (voice of Janet Reno in The Simpsons episode "Dark Knight Court"), (d. 2022).
- December 21: Frank Zappa, American rock artist and composer (voice of the Pope in The Ren & Stimpy Show episode "Powdered Toast Man", created background music for the first season of Duckman), (d. 1993).
- December 30: Jerry Granelli, American-Canadian jazz drummer (A Charlie Brown Christmas), (d. 2021).

=== Specific date unknown ===
- Leo D. Sullivan, American animator (Fat Albert and the Cosby Kids, The Transformers, BraveStarr, The Incredible Hulk, The New Adventures of Flash Gordon), (d. 2023).
- Orlando Corradi, Italian film animator and director (founder of Mondo TV), (d. 2018).
- Changiz Jalilvand, Iranian voice actor (dub voice of Bert in Mary Poppins), (d. 2020).
- Rick Hoover, American animator (Walt Disney Animation Studios, Hanna-Barbera, Filmation) and comics artist, (d. 1996).

== Deaths ==
=== January ===
- January 21: Otis Harlan, American actor and comedian (voice of Happy in Snow White and the Seven Dwarfs), dies at age 74.

=== February ===
- February 15: Norman Spencer, American musician and songwriter (Leon Schlesinger Productions), dies at age 48.

=== May ===
- May 17: Thoralf Klouman, Norwegian satirical illustrator and actor (produced the animated film Admiral Palads (1917), about the American president Woodrow Wilson), dies at age 50.

=== July ===
- July 2: Guido Seeber, German film director, cinematographer and animator (Prosit Neujahr 1910!), dies at age 61.

=== September ===
- September 2: Eddie Collins, American actor (voice of Dopey in Snow White and the Seven Dwarfs), dies at age 57.
- September 28: Earl Hurd, American animator, film director and comics artist (Bobby Bumps, co-creator of the cel animation technique which he patented in 1914, worked for J.R. Bray, The Van Beuren Corporation, Terrytoons, Ub Iwerks and the Walt Disney Company), dies at age 60.

=== Specific date unknown ===
- Alexander Black, American photographer, inventor, and writer (presented the magic lantern show Life through a Detective Camera(alternately titled Ourselves as Others See Us); created the pre-film "Picture Play" Miss Jerry, a series of posed magic lantern slides projected onto a screen with a dissolving stereopticon, accompanied by narration and music. It was the first example of a feature-length dramatic fiction on screen), dies at age 81.

== See also ==
- List of anime by release date (1939–1945)
