= How Wings Are Attached to the Backs of Angels =

Canadian animated short film

- Directed by: Craig Welch
- Written by: Craig Welch
- Produced by: Marcy Page
- Starring: Louise Leroux
- Music by: Normand Roger
- Production company: National Film Board of Canada
- Release date: 1996
- Running time: 11 minutes
- Country: Canada

How Wings Are Attached to the Backs of Angels is a 1996 animated short by Canadian animator Craig Welch, produced by the National Film Board of Canada (NFB).

While Welch's first film with the NFB, 1992's No Problem, was influenced by the comic style of NFB animators Cordell Barker and Richard Condie, How Wings Are Attached to the Backs of Angels marked a distinct change in artistic direction, exploring such darker themes as death and desire, in a style that has been called "surrealistic." Welch has stated that one of the original influences for the film was Arnold Böcklin's painting Isle of the Dead as well as Norman McLaren's 1946 NFB animated short A Little Phantasy on a 19th-century Painting, which incorporates the Böcklin work.

The film received commercial distribution in Canada as the opening film to screenings of David Cronenberg's film Crash.

== Awards ==
The film received multiple awards including a Special Prize at the Hiroshima International Animation Festival, Best of International Animation at the Jerusalem International Film Festival of Jerusalem, a Special Recognition for Design at the Zagreb World Festival of Animated Films, the Best Animation Film Award at the Dresden Filmfest, the Prize of Sparkasse at the International Leipzig Festival for Documentary and Animated Film and a Gold Hugo in the animation category at the Chicago International Film Festival.
