= The Hungry Squid =

2002 short film

- Directed by: John Weldon
- Written by: John Weldon
- Produced by: Marcy Page
- Narrated by: Derek McGrath
- Music by: John Weldon
- Production company: National Film Board of Canada (NFB)
- Release date: 2002
- Running time: 15 minutes
- Country: Canada
- Language: English

The Hungry Squid is 2002 animated short film by John Weldon, about a young girl whose homework and personal life is being disrupted by creatures, including a giant ravenous squid. The film was animated using Weldon's personal style of do-it-yourself filmmaking, combining low-budget computer animation with puppets, photos and stop-motion animation in a technique he calls "digital recyclomation." The film's producer, Marcy Page, had coined the term "recyclomation" during production of Weldon's 1991 film, The Lump.

This National Film Board of Canada production received seven awards, including the Genie Award for Best Animated Short and the Platinum Award at the WorldFest-Houston International Film Festival. The film is narrated by Derek McGrath.
