= Normand Roger =

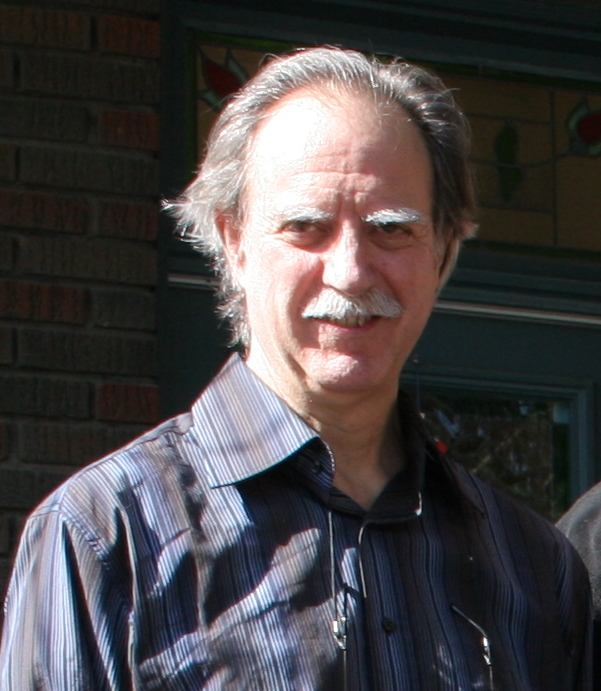
- Roger recording Waseteg in 2010

Background information
- Born: 1949 (age 75–76); Montreal, Quebec, Canada
- Genres: Film score, television
- Occupation: Composer
- Spouse: Marcy Page

Normand Roger (born 1949) is a Canadian composer, sound editor and sound designer. He is particularly known for his work as a composer of soundtracks for animated films, having composed more than 200 such works since 1970. He has also worked on the creation of music for documentaries, feature films, television dramas, children's series, commercials, and new technologies with 3D and virtual reality. He is the composer of many original soundtracks for Frédéric Back, Paul Driessen, Michaël Dudok de Wit, Caroline Leaf and Aleksandr Petrov. Thirteen of his works have been nominated for Academy Awards, of which six have won. He also notably wrote the theme for the PBS's Mystery!. Roger lectures throughout the world on music and sound for animation.

Roger has spent nearly 40 years creating soundtracks for the National Film Board of Canada (NFB) in his hometown of Montreal, after first being hired for its animation department at the age of 22. His extensive NFB credits include Every Child and The Sand Castle, both winners of the Academy Award for Best Animated Short Film.

He is married to animation film director and producer Marcy Page, whom he met while working with on her film, Paradisia.

== Filmography ==
- 1977: The Sand Castle
- 1979: Every Child - Sound, sound designer
- 1980: Mystery! - Composer, opening and closing theme
- 1980: The Sweater - Composer, music score, sound editor
- 1981: The Tender Tale of Cinderella Penguin - Sound, sound designer
- 1981: Crac
- 1981: Top Priority - Composer
- 1984: Paradise - Additional music, sound effects
- 1987: The Man Who Planted Trees
- 1988: The Dingles - Composer, sound editor
- 1992: No Problem - Composer
- 1993: Divine Fate - Composer
- 1995: The Champagne Safari - Composer
- 1996: How Wings Are Attached to the Backs of Angels - Composer
- 1996: Shyness - Composer, sound editor
- 1999: The Old Man and the Sea - Composer
- 2000: Father and Daughter - Music score
- 2010: Glimpses/Impressions - Music score
- 2019: Uncle Thomas: Accounting for the Days - Composer, sound designer
- 2023: A Bear Named Wojtek - Music score
