= Island of the Dead (paintings) =

Painting by Arnold Böcklin

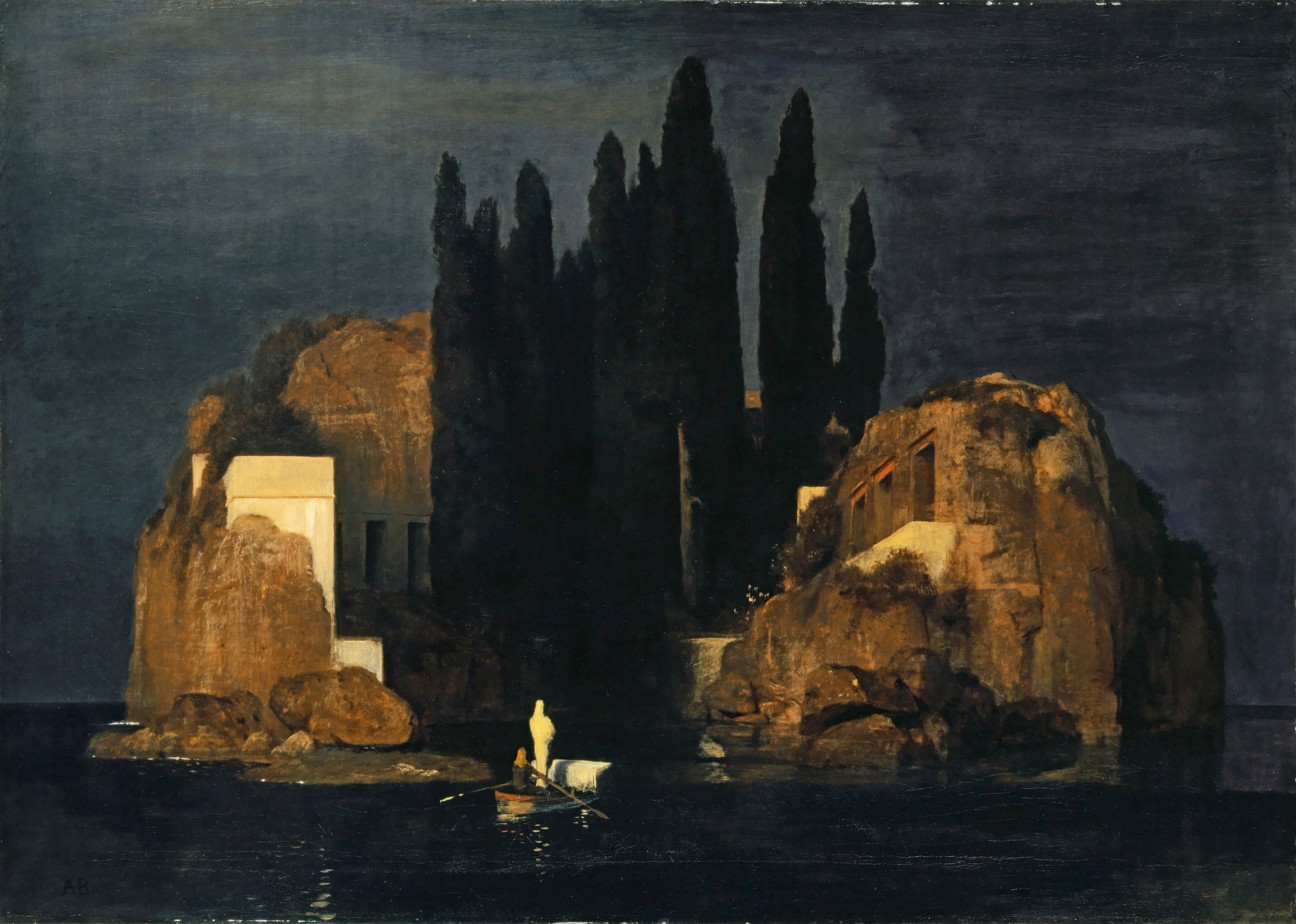
Island of the Dead: "Basel" version, 1880

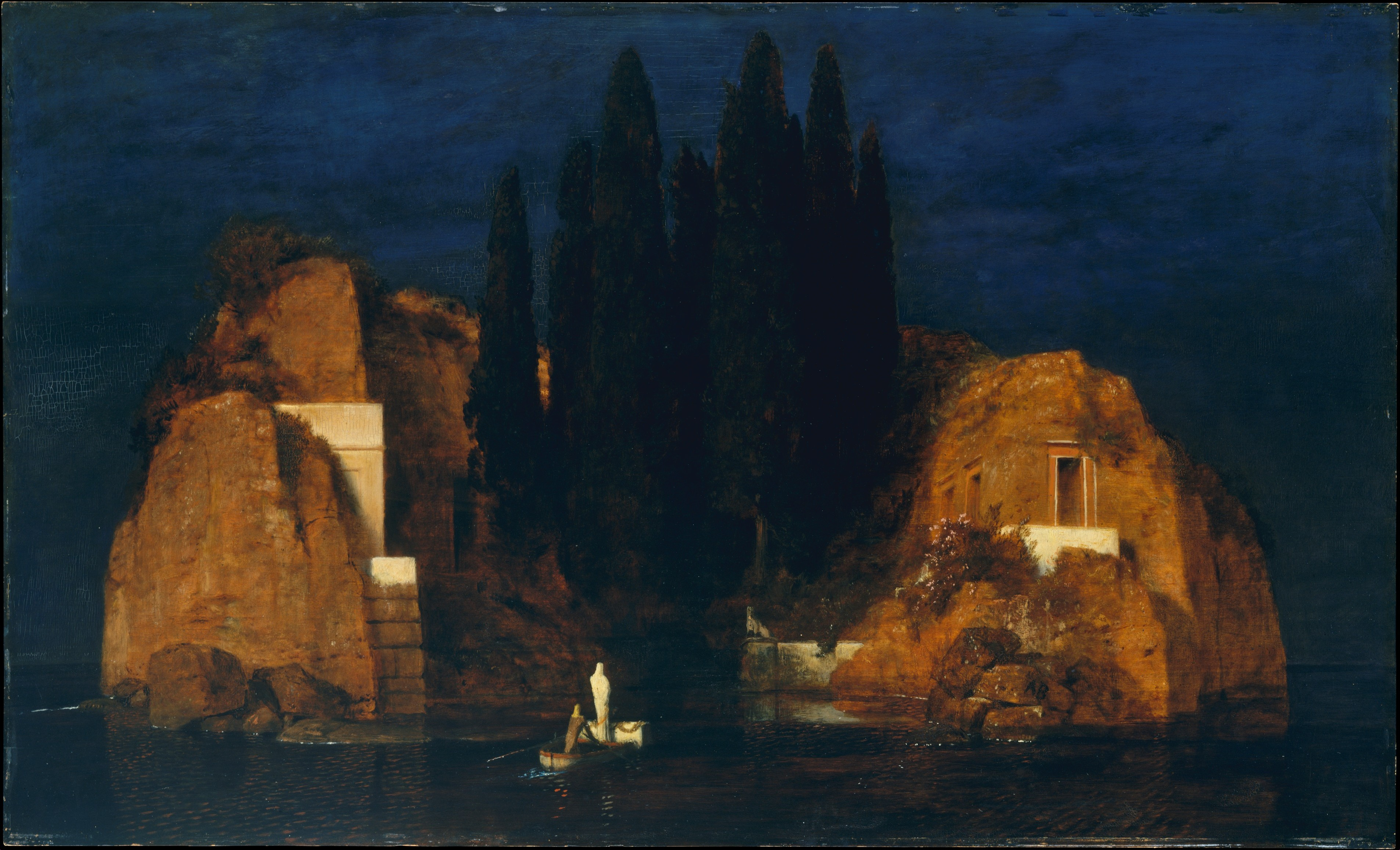
Island of the Dead: "New York" version, 1880

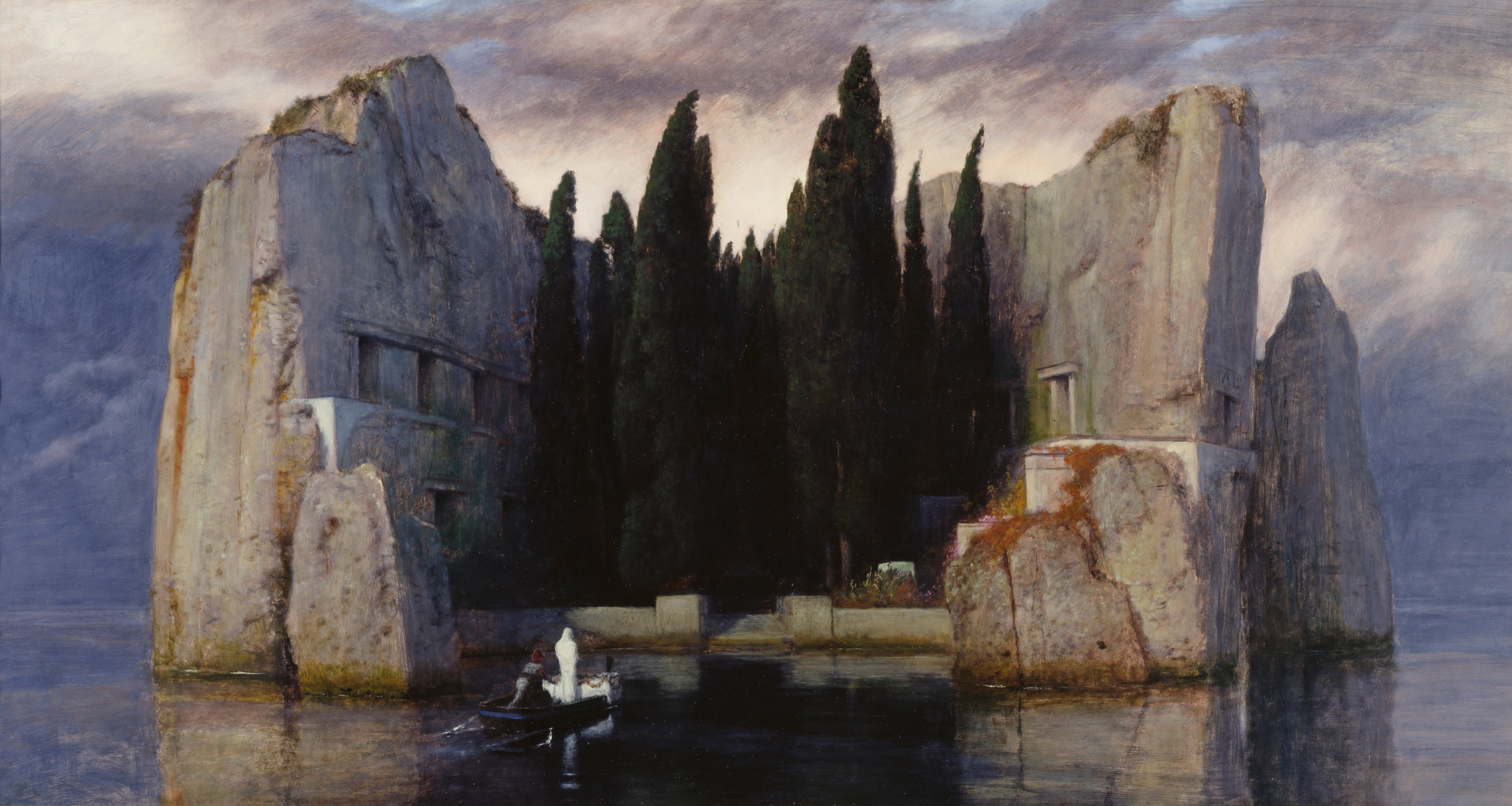
Island of the Dead: Third version, 1883

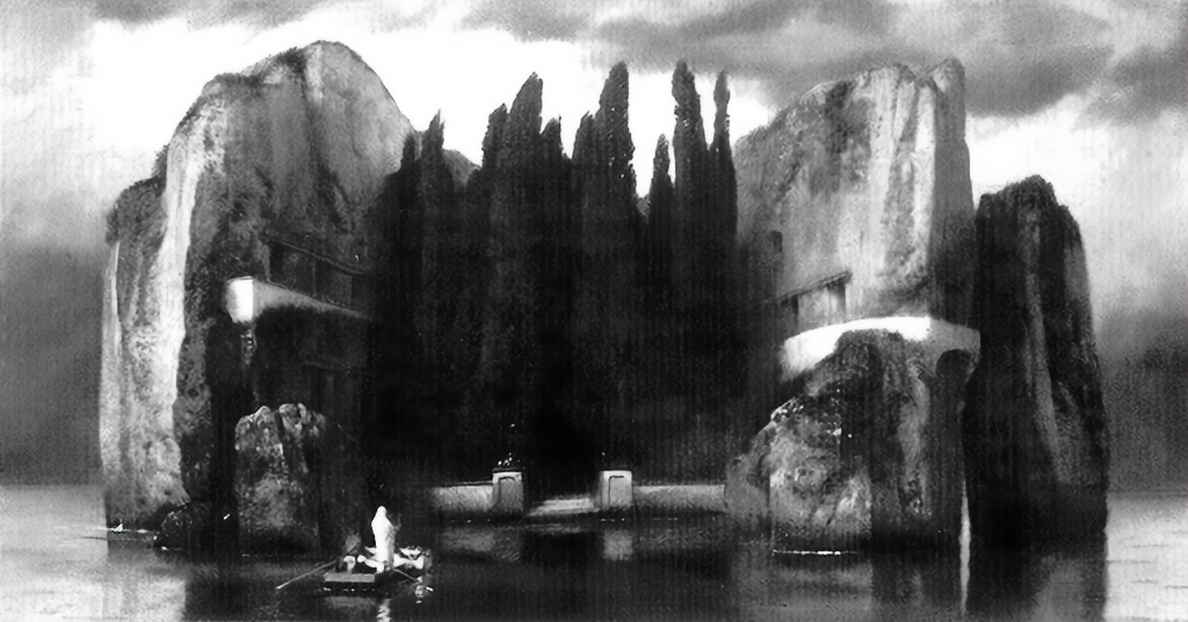
Island of the Dead: Fourth version, 1884 (black-and-white photograph)

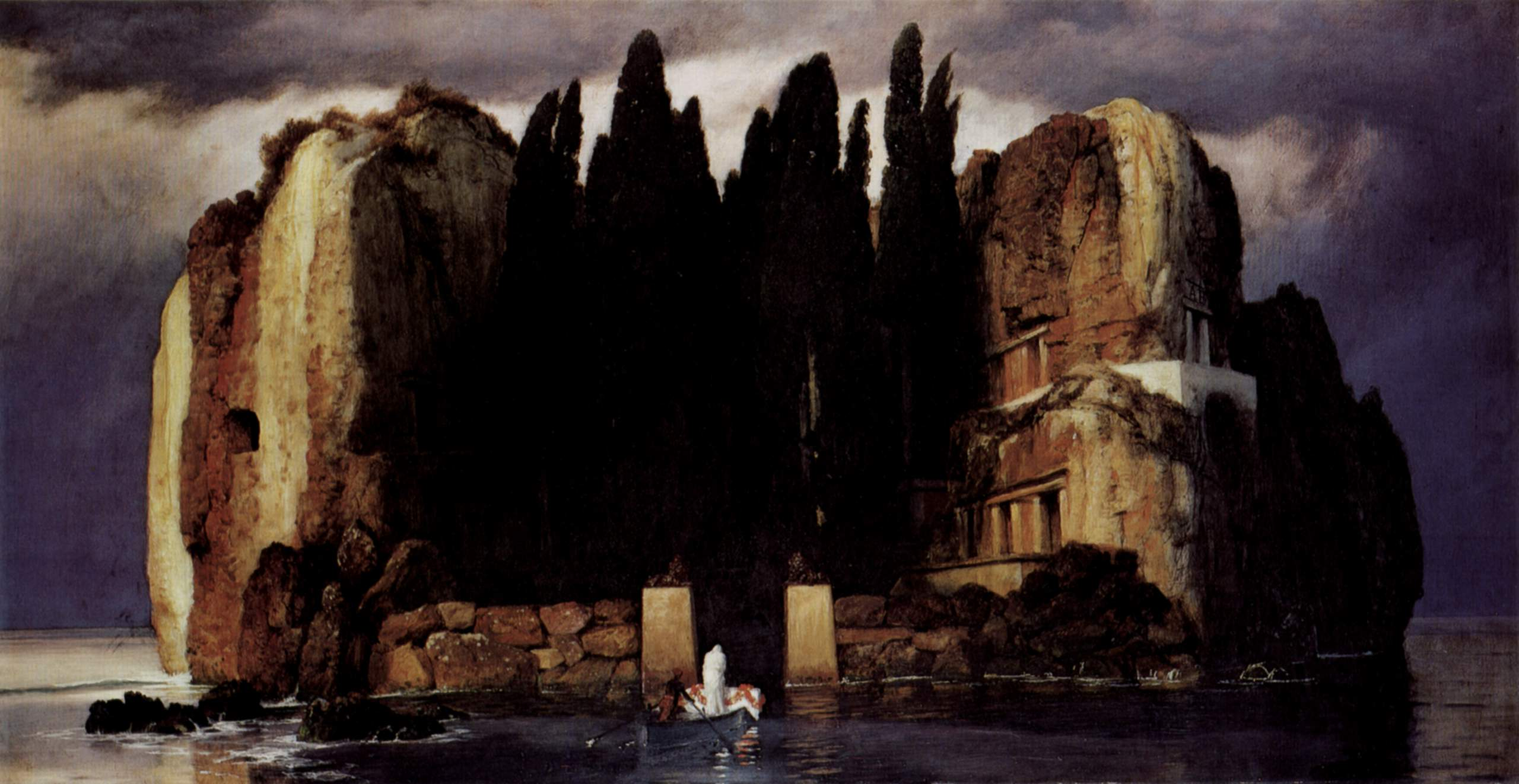
Island of the Dead: Fifth version, 1886

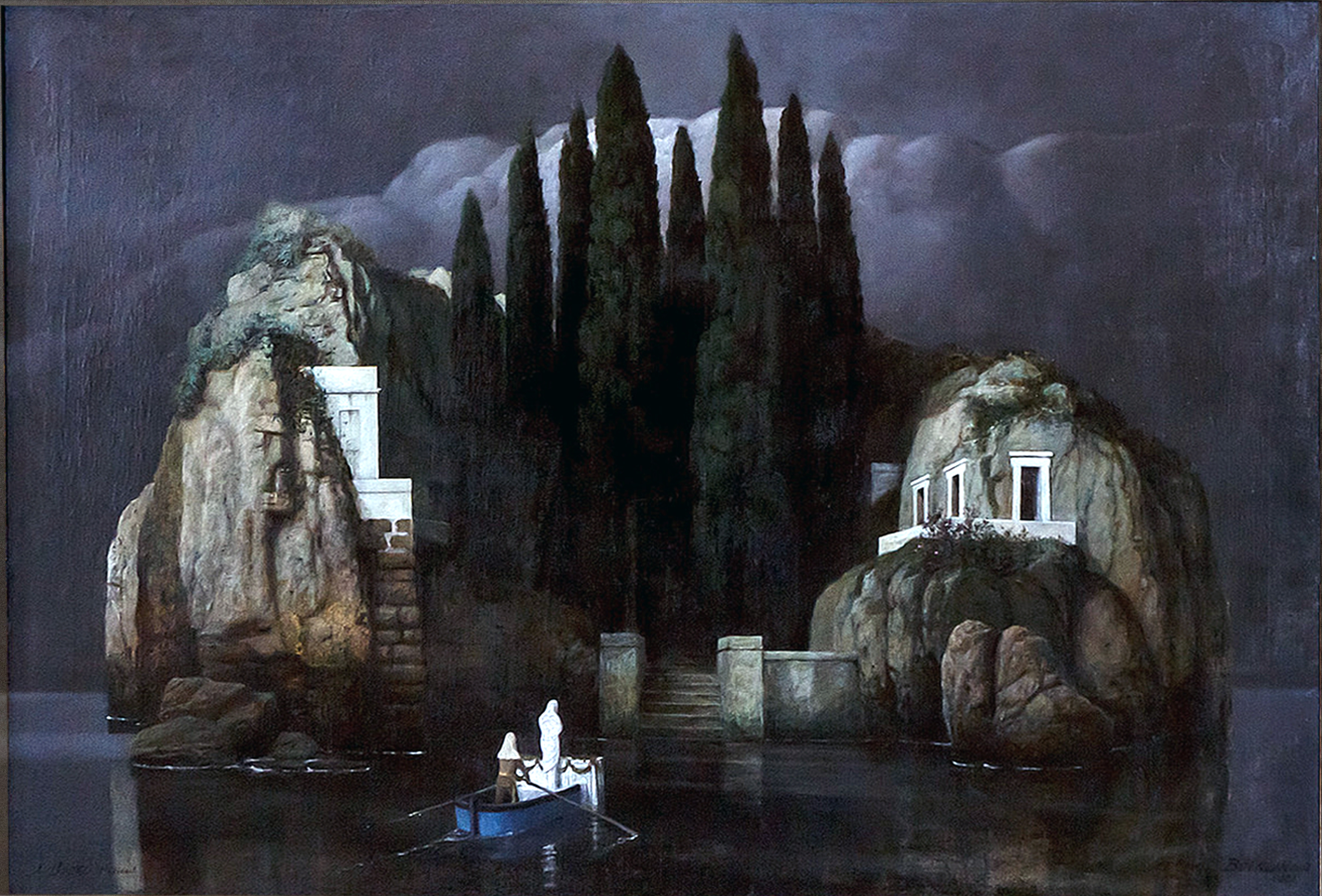
Island of the Dead: Sixth version, 1901

Island of the Dead (German: Die Toteninsel) is the best-known painting of Swiss symbolist artist Arnold Böcklin (1827–1901). Prints were very popular in central Europe in the early 20th century—Vladimir Nabokov observed in his 1936 novel Despair that they could be "found in every Berlin home".

Böcklin produced several different versions of the painting between 1880 and 1886, which today are exhibited in Basel, New York City, Berlin, and Leipzig. A sixth version, begun in autumn 1900 with the help of Böcklin's son Carlo Böcklin and finished by Carlo in 1901, is part of the Hermitage Museum's collection in Saint Petersburg.

== Description and meaning ==
All versions of Island of the Dead depict a desolate and rocky islet seen across an expanse of dark water. A small rowing boat is just arriving at a water gate and seawall on shore. An oarsman maneuvers the boat from the stern. In the bow, facing the gate, is a standing figure clad entirely in white. Just ahead of the figure is a white, festooned object commonly interpreted as a coffin. The tiny islet is dominated by a dense grove of tall, dark cypress trees—associated by long-standing tradition with cemeteries and mourning—which is closely hemmed in by precipitous cliffs. Furthering the funerary theme are what appear to be sepulchral portals and windows on the rock faces.

Böcklin himself provided no public explanation as to the meaning of the painting, though he did describe it as "a dream picture: it must produce such a stillness that one would be awed by a knock on the door". The title, which was conferred upon it by the art dealer Fritz Gurlitt in 1883, was not specified by Böcklin, though it does derive from a phrase in an 1880 letter he sent to the painting's original commissioner. Not knowing the history of the early versions of the painting (see §Versions), many observers have interpreted the oarsman as representing the boatman Charon, who ferried souls to the underworld in Greek mythology. The water would then be either the River Styx or the River Acheron, and his white-clad passenger a recently deceased soul transiting to the afterlife.

== Origins and inspiration ==
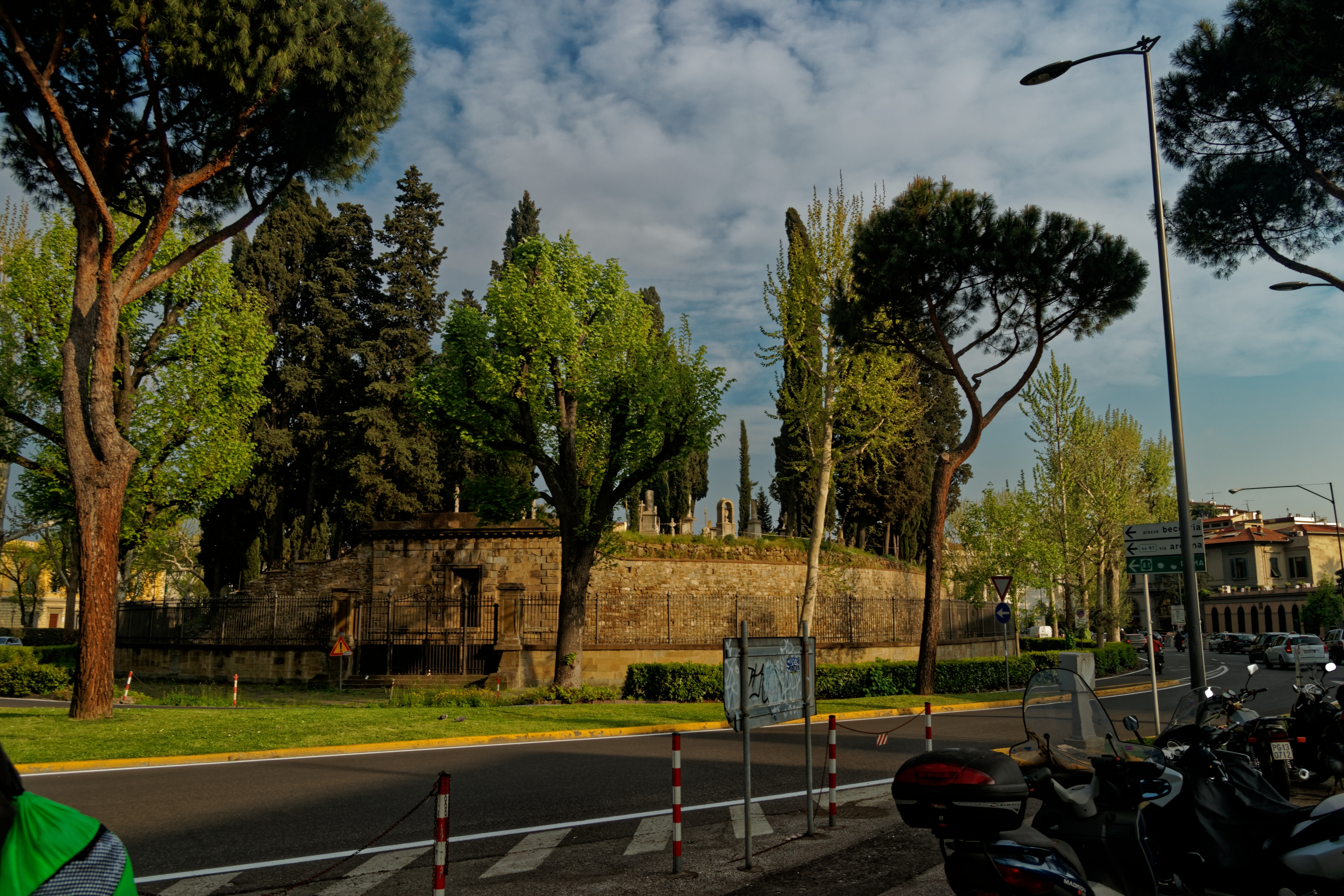
English Cemetery, Florence

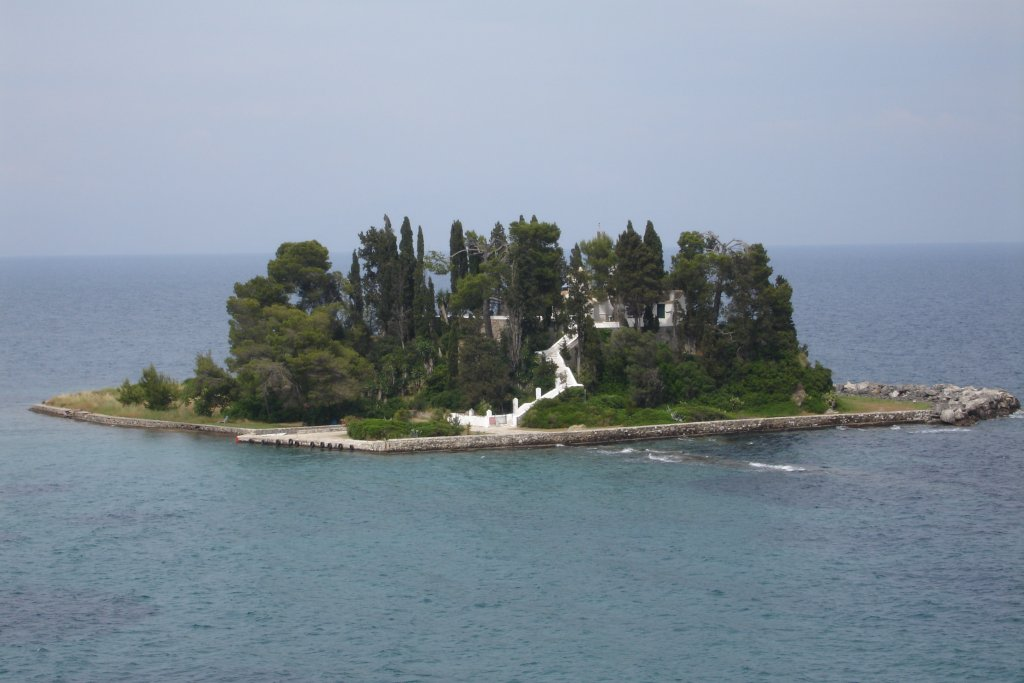
Greek island Pontikonisi, near Corfu, was a possible inspiration for the painting

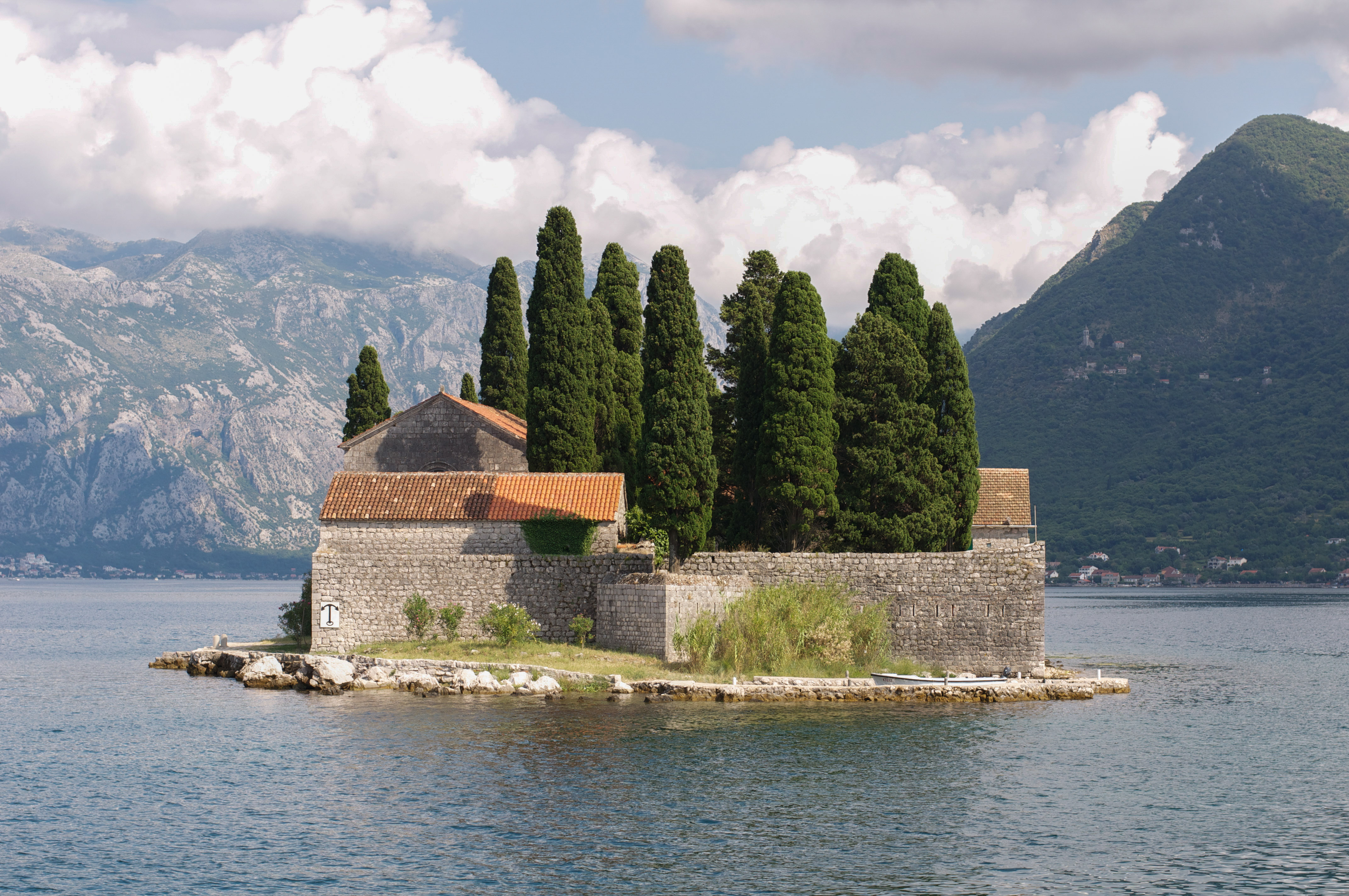
Montenegrin island Saint George near Perast, is another likely contender as the inspiration for the painting

Island of the Dead evokes, in part, the English Cemetery in Florence, Italy, where the first three versions were painted. The cemetery was close to Böcklin's studio and was also where his infant daughter Maria was buried. (In all, Böcklin lost 8 of his 14 children.)

The model for the rocky islet was perhaps Pontikonisi, a small, lush island near Corfu, which is adorned with a small chapel amid a cypress grove, perhaps in combination with the mysterious rocky island of Strombolicchio near the famous volcano Stromboli, Sicily. (Another less likely candidate is the island of Ponza in the Tyrrhenian Sea.)

== Versions ==
Böcklin completed the first version of the painting in May 1880 for his patron Alexander Günther but kept it for himself. In April 1880, while the painting was in progress, Böcklin's Florence studio had been visited by Marie Berna, née Christ (widow of financier Georg von Berna (1836–1865) and soon-to-be wife of the German politician Waldemar, Count of Oriola (1854–1910)). She was struck by the first version of this "dream image" (now in the Kunstmuseum Basel), which sat half completed on the easel, so Böcklin painted a smaller version on wood for her (now in the Metropolitan Museum of Art in New York City). At Berna's request, he added the coffin and female figure, an allusion to her husband's death from diphtheria years earlier. Subsequently, he added these elements to the earlier painting. He called these works Die Gräberinsel ("Tomb Island"). (Sometimes the Basel version is credited as the first; sometimes the New York version is.) It was acquired by the Gottfried Keller-Stiftung in 1920.

The third version was painted in 1883 for Böcklin's dealer Fritz Gurlitt. Beginning with this version, one of the burial chambers in the rocks on the right bears Böcklin's initials, "A.B." In 1933, this version was put up for sale, and noted Böcklin admirer Adolf Hitler acquired it. He hung it first at the Berghof in Obersalzberg and then, after 1940, in the New Reich Chancellery in Berlin. It is now at the Alte Nationalgalerie, Berlin.

Financial imperatives resulted in a fourth version in 1884, which was ultimately acquired by the entrepreneur and art collector Baron Heinrich Thyssen and hung at his Berliner Bank subsidiary. It was burned after a bomb attack during World War II and survives only as a black-and-white photograph.

A fifth version was commissioned in 1886 by the Museum of Fine Arts, Leipzig, where it still hangs.

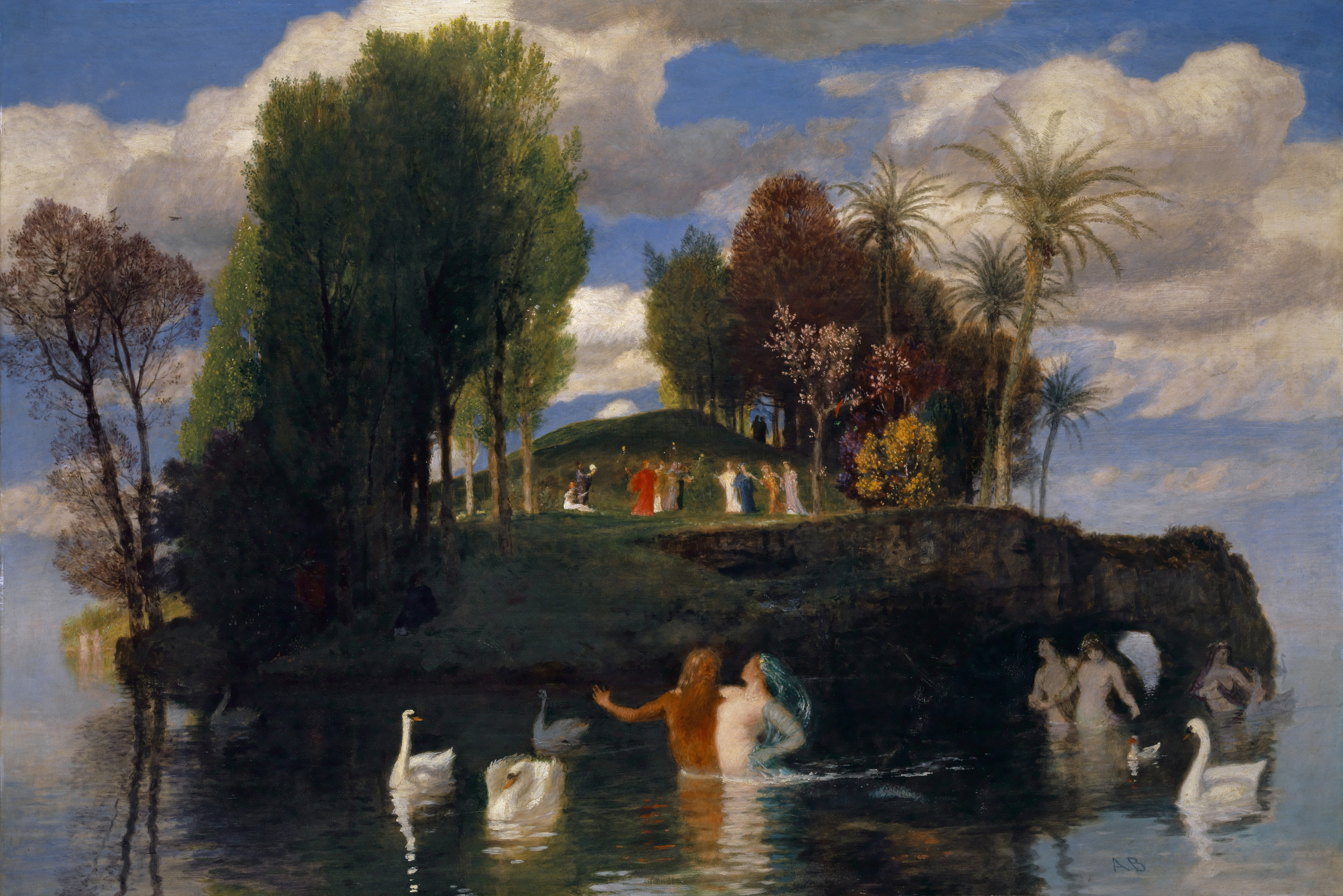
Isle of Life, 1888

In 1888, Böcklin created a painting called Die Lebensinsel ("Isle of Life"). Probably intended as an antipole to the Island of the Dead, it also shows a small island, but with all signs of joy and life. Together with the first version of the Island of the Dead, this painting is part of the collection of the Kunstmuseum Basel.

A sixth version, allegedly created in 1901 and acquired in 2022 from a private collection, can be found at the State Hermitage (General Staff building) in Saint Petersburg. It bears the signatures A. Böcklin invenit ("devised by A. Böcklin") and Carlo Böcklin fecit 1901 ("executed by Carlo Böcklin 1901"), and can therefore be assumed to be the version mentioned by the Thieme-Becker biographical dictionary which was started by Arnold Böcklin together with Carlo in autumn 1900.

=== Versions ===
1. May 1880—Oil on canvas; 111 × 155 cm; Öffentliche Kunstsammlung, Kunstmuseum, Basel.
2. June 1880—Oil on board; 74 × 122 cm; The Metropolitan Museum of Art, Reisinger Fund, New York.
3. 1883—Oil on board; 80 × 150 cm; Alte Nationalgalerie, Staatliche Museen zu Berlin.
4. 1884—Oil on copper; 81 × 151 cm; destroyed in Berlin during World War II.
5. 1886—Oil on board; 80 × 150 cm; Museum der bildenden Künste, Leipzig.
6. (with Carlo Böcklin) 1901—Oil on canvas; Hermitage (General Staff building), Saint Petersburg.

== Admirers ==
The painting has attracted a wide variety of admirers. Freud kept a reproduction in his office; Lenin had one above his bed; Hitler bought one of the originals. Vladimir Nabokov wrote that reproductions of the painting could be “found in every Berlin home”. Nietzsche described him as a "path-seeking painter" in a personal notebook.

== Works inspired by Island of the Dead ==
=== Paintings ===
- Salvador Dalí's 1932 painting The True Painting of "The Isle of the Dead" by Arnold Bocklin at the Hour of the Angelus is inspired by Böcklin's work.
- The Swiss artist H. R. Giger created two versions of the picture, Island of Death (1975) and Hommage à Böcklin (1977), in his typical biomechanical style.
- Australian Surrealist painter James Gleeson drew a parallel with the painting and the entrance to the underworld in the Aeneid in his 1989 work Avernus Transvisioned as Böcklin's Isle.

=== Drama ===
==== Ballet ====
- Liam Scarlett’s final work for San Francisco Ballet was Die Toteninsel (2019), inspired by the symphonic poem of Rachmaninoff as well as the painting.

==== Film ====
- The design of Skull Island in King Kong (1933) was influenced by Island of the Dead.
- Val Lewton, a producer best known for his horror films, used the painting in scene backgrounds for his 1943 I Walked with a Zombie, a Jacques Tourneur film about zombies inhabiting an island. His 1945 film Isle of the Dead, directed by Mark Robson, was inspired by and named for the painting. The work serves as a backdrop to the picture's title sequence.
- The painting has inspired two National Film Board of Canada animated shorts. It is the actual backdrop for Norman McLaren's A Little Phantasy on a 19th-century Painting (1946). Animator Craig Welch has stated that both the painting and McLaren's film were inspirations for his 1996 short How Wings Are Attached to the Backs of Angels.
- The Piano Tuner of Earthquakes references the painting in its set design and lighting for the villain's personal island.

=== Literature ===
- Roger Zelazny used the picture as an inspiration for the meeting place of two mythological beings (one of them the alter-ego of the protagonist, Francis Sandow) in his novel Isle of the Dead (1969). In-universe, Sandow references the painting as he recollects having created the world where it lies.

=== Music ===
- Dezso d'Antalffy, a Hungarian Romantic composer, wrote a symphonic poem "Die Toteninsel" in 1907.
- Sergei Rachmaninoff composed a symphonic poem Isle of the Dead, Op. 29 (1909), inspired by a black-and-white print of the painting. He said that had he seen the colour original, he probably would not have written the music.
- One of the four tone poems of German composer Max Reger's Vier Tondichtungen nach A. Böcklin (Op. 128, 1913) is "Die Toteninsel" (No. 3), based on the painting.
- French post-black metal band Alcest's Spiritual Instinct album takes major inspiration from the painting.

=== Video games ===
- The German survival horror video game SIGNALIS by rose-engine studio references all versions of the painting several times, as it plays a crucial role in understanding the relationship between the main character and her lover.

== See also ==
- List of paintings by Arnold Böcklin
