= Mathmakers =

Mathmakers was a Canadian educational children's television series produced from 1978 to 1980 by the province of Ontario's public television network, TVOntario. The series starred Derek McGrath and Lyn Harvey and included guest stars such as Joe Flaherty.

Producer/Director Clive Vanderburgh, Production Assistant Jane Downey and Brian Elston, Editor.

The premise is set in a television studio where the production crew produces an educational series illustrating various concepts of grade school mathematics.
