= Noël Noël =

- Written by: Martin Barry
- Directed by: Nicola Lemay
- Narrated by: Leslie Nielsen; Benoît Brière
- Music by: Daniel Scott
- Country of origin: Canada
- Original languages: English; French

Production
- Producers: Marc Bertrand; Jean-Jacques Leduc; Marcy Page
- Running time: 22 minutes
- Production company: Teletoon

Original release
- Network: Teletoon
- Release: December 13, 2003

Noël Noël is a 22-minute animated short produced by the National Film Board of Canada in 2003 as a Christmas special. It was directed by Nicola Lemay and written by Martin Barry. The English-language version was adapted by John Weldon and narrated by Leslie Nielsen. The original French-language version was narrated by Benoît Brière.

Awards for the film included the Prix Gémeaux for Best Animated Program or Series and an Award of Excellence in the category of Animation age 6 - 8 from the Alliance for Children and Television.

In the United States, the short aired on Cartoon Network.

== Plot ==
Billionaire businessman Noel Noël is rich but rude. He falls for a fairy named Beatrice, and tries to win her love with material gifts before learning the true meaning of love from a little girl named Zoey Murphy, her dog Snooze, and a blue-eyed reindeer.

== See also ==
- List of Christmas films
