= Pontikonisi =

Islet near Corfu, Greece

Native name: Ποντικονήσι
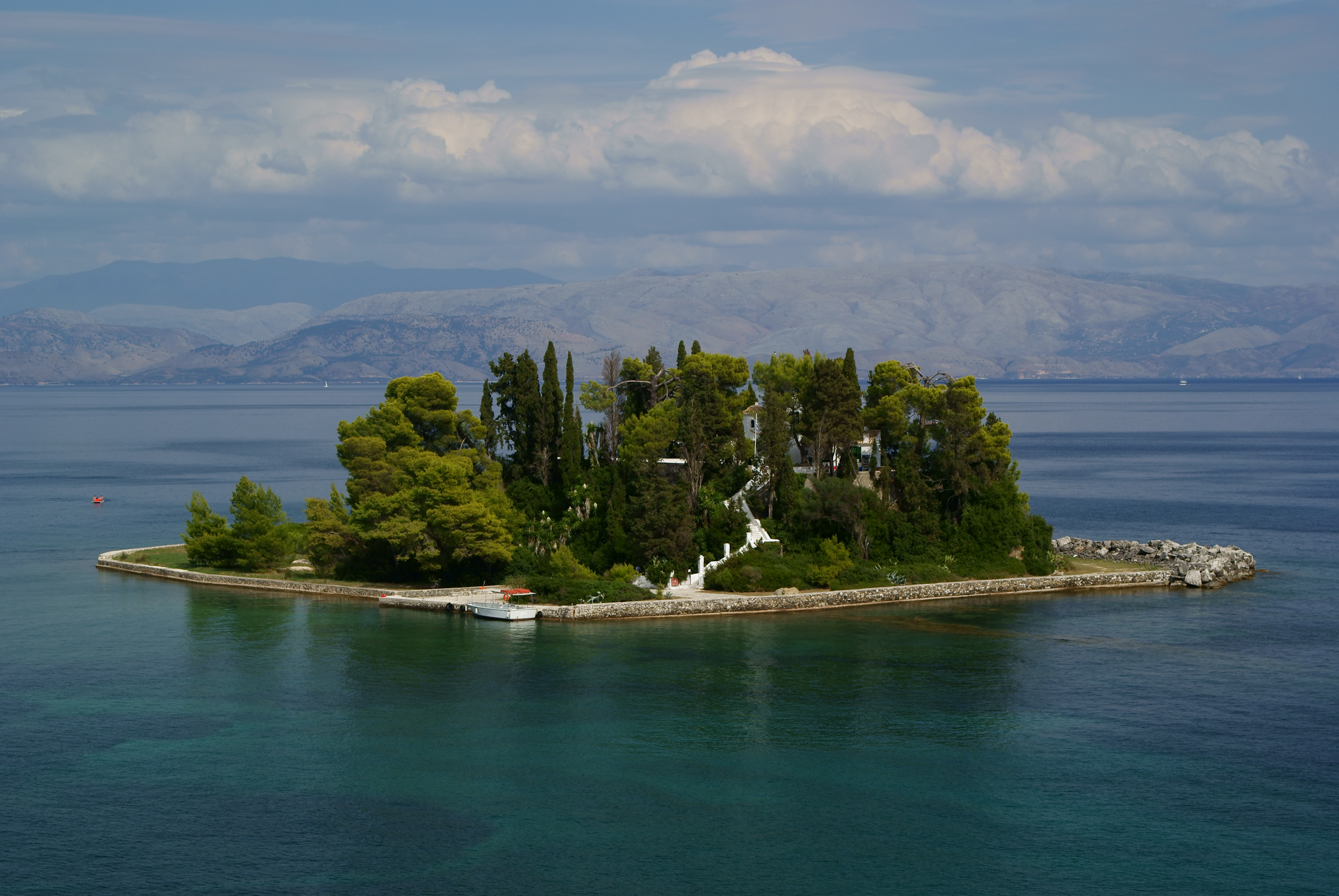
- The islet of Pontikonisi

- Location within Corfu

Geography
- Location: Mediterranean Sea
- Coordinates: 39°35′11″N 19°55′04″E
- Area: 1 ha (2.5 acres)

Administration
- Greece
- Municipality: Corfu

Demographics
- Population: Uninhabited

Pontikonisi (Greek: Ποντικονήσι, "Mouse Island") is a Greek islet near the island of Corfu. Its prominent feature is a Byzantine chapel of Christ Pantokrator, dating from the 11th or 12th century.

The island of Pontikonisi might have served as an inspiration for Arnold Böcklin's painting Isle of the Dead.

Some of the ashes of the British conservationist Gerald Durrell, as well as those of his sister Margaret Durrell, were scattered on the island: the Durrells lived on Corfu as children and used to swim out to it.

== See also ==
- Pondikonisi, an island off the coast of Crete
- List of islands of Greece
