= Craig Welch =

Canadian animator (1948-2020)

- Born: September 27, 1948; Windsor, Ontario
- Died: May 18, 2020 (aged 71)
- Occupation: animator
- Notable work: No Problem; How Wings Are Attached to the Backs of Angels

Craig Welch (September 27, 1948 – May 18, 2020) was a Canadian animator. He was most noted for his short films No Problem, which was a Genie Award nominee for Best Animated Short Film at the 14th Genie Awards in 1993, and How Wings Are Attached to the Backs of Angels, which won a number of awards at film festivals in 1996.

Welch, a native of Windsor, Ontario, owned an independent bookstore in Oshawa for a number of years before deciding to study animation at Sheridan College, where he released his first short film, Disconnected, as a student project in 1988. He subsequently joined the National Film Board of Canada, for whom he made both No Problem (1992) and How Wings Are Attached to the Backs of Angels (1996).

His final short film, Welcome to Kentucky, was released in 2004, and was a Jutra Award nominee for Best Animated Short Film at the 7th Jutra Awards in 2005. He then retired from the NFB and settled in Montreal, where he pursued painting. He was diagnosed with Alzheimer's disease in the late 2010s, and died of COVID-19 in Montreal on May 18, 2020 during the COVID-19 pandemic in Montreal.
