= Derek McGrath =

Canadian actor

- Born: June 4, 1951 (age 75); Timmins, Ontario, Canada
- Occupations: Actor; writer
- Years active: 1969–present

Derek McGrath (born June 4, 1951) is a Canadian actor and writer.

== Life and career ==
McGrath was born in Timmins, Ontario. His career began as Linus in You're a Good Man, Charlie Brown. He is known for his roles in Cheers as Andy Schroeder (the would-be strangler of Diane Chambers), Oswald Valentine in Dallas, Dr. Benjamin Jeffcoate in My Secret Identity, Crewman Chell in Star Trek: Voyager, and as Dr. Derek Hebert in Doc.

McGrath played Buck the dog in a fantasy sequence in a second-season episode of Married... with Children, a game show host in a third-season episode of Family Matters, and a mutant in the 1993 comedy film Freaked. He appeared in a recurring role as the character of Anglican priest Duncan Magee in the CBC Television sitcom Little Mosque on the Prairie.

He voices Spiff in the animated children's series Iggy Arbuckle. He voices Melvin, the mayor of Maple Lake in the animated series Bob & Doug. He provided the voice of Heathcliff's nemesis Spike in DIC's Heathcliff and the Catillac Cats. He has voiced various characters in Grossology, Pole Position, The Romance of Betty Boop, Intergalactic Thanksgiving, Bakugan Battle Brawlers, Super Why!, Wayside, Ruby Gloom, Toot and Puddle, Spliced, Jane and the Dragon and Take Me Up to the Ball Game. He voices Mr. McFeely in Daniel Tiger's Neighborhood and Chief Quimby in Inspector Gadget.

In the 1970s, he was a prominent actor on TVOntario educational programming, most notably Mathmakers. In 2002, he narrated the National Film Board of Canada short animated film The Hungry Squid, which won the Genie Award for Best Animated Short. McGrath had a recurring role on Kim's Convenience as Frank the handyman. He played Garth Harble, Animal Control Officer, in the fifth season of The Red Green Show.

His brother is fellow actor Doug McGrath.

== Filmography ==
=== Film ===
Film
| Year | Title | Role | Notes |
|---|---|---|---|
| 1973 | The Last Detail | Nichiren Shoshu Member | |
| 1980 | Nothing Personal | Gas Jockey | |
| 1983 | The Funny Farm | Harvey | |
| 1983 | Mr. Mom | Exec. #1 | |
| 1987 | Police Academy 4: Citizens on Patrol | Butterworth | |
| 1989 | She's Out of Control | Jeff Robbins | |
| 1993 | Freaked | Worm/Worm as an Oxford Professor | Dual role |
| 1993 | The Legend II | | Voice |
| 1994 | Fist of Legend | | Voice; English version |
| 1995 | My Father is a Hero | | Also known as The Enforcer and Jet Li's The Enforcer; Voice |
| 1995 | Hologram Man | Secretary Culkin | Direct-to-video |
| 1995 | Chameleon | Morris Steinfeld | |
| 1995 | Stuart Bliss | Mover | |
| 1999 | Nice Guys Sleep Alone | Eddie | |
| 1999 | Bloodsport 4: The Dark Kumite | Warden Preston | |
| 2001 | The Safety of Objects | Mr. Peabody | |
| 2002 | The Hungry Squid | Narrator | Animated short film Voice |
| 2007 | Full of It | Principal Marcus Hayes | |
| 2007 | Charlie Bartlett | Superintendent Sedgwick | |
| 2009 | Zombie Dearest | Uncle Pete | |
| 2010 | Planting Season | The Man | Short film |
| 2013 | Alice | Smoking Man | Short film |
| 2013 | Carrie | Head Commissioner | |
| 2015 | Gridlocked | Booking Officer | |
| 2016 | Blood Brothers | | Short film |
| 2016 | An American Dream: The Education of William Bowman | Oswald Chambers | |
| 2019 | The Marijuana Conspiracy | John Bradow | |
| TBA | Camila: a Fable | Sebastian Sosa | Short film |
| TBA | The Wall | | Short film Post-production |
| TBA | One (Nine) | | Post-production |

=== Television ===
Television
| Year | Title | Role | Notes |
|---|---|---|---|
| 1977 | Custard Pie | Harvey Douglas | |
| 1978 | King of Kensington | Bobby | Season 4 episode 8: "The Purse Snatcher" |
| 1978 | Mathmakers | Cal Harrison | |
| 1979 | Intergalactic Thanksgiving or Please Don't Eat the Planet | Prince Notfunnyenuf | Voice |
| 1980 | Take Me Up to the Ball Game | | TV movie Credited as Derek McGarth |
| 1983 | AfterMASH | Dave Glass | Season 1 episode 10: "Thanksgiving of '53" |
| 1983–1992 | Cheers | Andy Schroeder / Andy | 4 episodes |
| 1984 | Shaping Up | Wayne Lewis | Episode 5: "Defusing the Muse" |
| 1984 | Draw! | Reggie Bell | TV movie |
| 1984 | At Your Service | Jerry Bianco | TV movie |
| 1984 | The Cracker Brothers | Derek Cracker | TV movie |
| 1984 | Pole Position | Additional voices | Voice |
| 1984–1986 | Newhart | Cousin Eugene Wiley / Waiter #1 | 2 episodes |
| 1984–1986 | Heathcliff | Spike / Muggsy / Knuckles / Lefty / Knuckles / Mr. Woodley / Additional voices | Also known as Heathcliff and the Catillac Cats and Les Entrechats in French; Voice; 23 episodes |
| 1985 | The Romance of Betty Boop | Waldo Van Lavish | TV movie Voice |
| 1985 | Comedy Factory | Repair Man / John / Melvin / Otis | 7 episodes |
| 1985 | Growing Pains | Encyclopedia Salesman | Season 1 episode 7: "Weekend Fantasy" |
| 1985–1986 | Hangin' In | Hudson / Bucky | 2 episodes |
| 1986 | The Last Precinct | | "Pilot"; TV movie |
| 1986 | Mary | Ronnie | 4 episodes |
| 1986–1988 | Dallas | Oswald Valentine | 17 episodes |
| 1987 | Married... with Children | Buck | Season 2 episode 4: "Buck Can Do It" |
| 1987 | The Real Ghostbusters | Simon Quegg | Voice; Season 2 episode 27: "The Man Who Never Reached Home" |
| 1987 | Take Five | Al | Main role; 6 episodes |
| 1987–1993 | Street Legal | Frank McCrindle / Terry Silver | 2 episodes |
| 1988 | Who's the Boss? | Tony Petardi | Season 4 episode 24: "The Two Tonys" |
| 1988–1991 | My Secret Identity | Dr. Benjamin Jeffcoate / Mr. Jeffcoate / Slimeball | 72 episodes |
| 1991 | Empty Nest | Dr. Yardley | Season 4 episode 1: "50 Million Men and a Baby" |
| 1991 | E.N.G. | Joel MacFarlane | Season 3 episode 4: "Secrets" |
| 1992 | The Golden Girls | Coordinator | Season 7 episode 16: "Questions and Answers" |
| 1992 | Roc | Ian | Season 2 episode 4: "Roc Works for Joey" |
| 1992–1998 | Family Matters | Conductor / Pat | 2 episodes |
| 1993 | Against the Grain | Abel | Episode 5: "Don't Be a Stranger" |
| 1994 | Golden Gate | Otto Munson | TV movie |
| 1994–2000 | Walker, Texas Ranger | Reporter / Harris | 2 episodes |
| 1995 | The Red Green Show | Garth Harble | 9 episodes |
| 1995–2000 | Star Trek: Voyager | Chell / Crewman Chell | 2 episodes |
| 1996 | The Client | Arnie | 4 episodes |
| 1996–1997 | In the House | Bernie / Agent Dick Kelly | 6 episodes |
| 1997 | Ellen | Stanley Peck | Season 4 episode 16: "Ellen Unplugged" |
| 1999 | Inherit the Wind | Radio Technician | TV movie |
| 2000 | The Huntress | Driver | Episode 1: "What Ralph Left Behind" |
| 2001 | Mentors | Gregor Mendel | Season 3 episode 2: "The Odd Pod" |
| 2001 | Made in Canada | Dave | Also known as The Industry and La loi du Show-Biz in French; Season 4 episode 1: "The Pitch" |
| 2001 | Earth: Final Conflict | Pax | Season 5 episode 9: "Entombed" |
| 2001–2004 | Doc | Dr. Derek Hebert | Main role; 88 episodes |
| 2002 | Whitewash: The Clarence Brandley Story | Icky Peace | TV movie |
| 2005 | Sue Thomas: F.B.Eye | Gregory Gilborn | Season 3 episode 19: "Endings and Beginnings" |
| 2006 | This Is Wonderland | Charlie Ross | Episode: #3.8 |
| 2006 | 1-800-Missing | | Season 3 episode 17: "Double Take" |
| 2006 | Grossology | Mr. Fowler | Also known as Glurp Attack in France; Season 1 episode 10: "Owl Most Foul" |
| 2006 | Aladdin: The Magical Family Musical | Widow Bender | TV movie |
| 2006–2007 | Ruby Gloom | Mr. Mummbles (uncredited) | 3 episodes |
| 2007 | Iggy Arbuckle | Spiff | Voice; Episode 1: "Iggy vs. the Volcano"/A Dip in the Pole" |
| 2007 | Wide Awake | Dr. Matt Einen | TV movie |
| 2007–2011 | Little Mosque on the Prairie | Reverend Duncan Magee | 52 episodes |
| 2008 | Daniel's Daughter | Jim Cavanaugh | TV movie |
| 2009 | Bob & Doug | Mayor Melvin | Voice; 2 episodes |
| 2010 | You Lucky Dog | Bus Driver | TV movie |
| 2010 | Fairfield Road | Sam Peabody | TV movie |
| 2011 | She's the Mayor | Frank Crumb | Main role; 13 episodes |
| 2011 | Dan for Mayor | Pork Council Chairman | Season 2 episode 26: "Porktoberfest" |
| 2011 | Justin Time | Grampa | Voice; Season 1 episode 2: "Yodel Odel Day & Wait, Little Penguin!" |
| 2011 | Christmas Magic | Henry | TV movie |
| 2012–2015 | Daniel Tiger's Neighborhood | Mr. McFeely / Additional Voices | Voice; 47 episodes |
| 2013 | Oh Christmas Tree | Hank | TV movie |
| 2013 | Christmas with Tucker | Hank Fisher | TV movie |
| 2015 | Beauty & the Beast | Priest | Season 3 episode 8: "Shotgun Wedding" |
| 2015 | Christmas Incorporated | Extra | TV movie Uncredited |
| 2015 | Northpole: Open for Christmas | Pete Elfman | TV movie |
| 2015 | Last Chance for Christmas | Santa | TV movie |
| 2015–2016 | Good Witch | Vice Principal | 3 episodes |
| 2015–2018 | Inspector Gadget | Chief Quimby | Voice; Main role; 52 episodes |
| 2016 | A Puppy for Christmas | Gramps | TV movie |
| 2016 | Sound of Christmas | Earl McKinley | TV movie |
| 2016–2019 | Suits | Mr. Paulson | 2 episodes |
| 2016–2021 | Kim's Convenience | Frank | 13 episodes |
| 2017 | True and the Rainbow Kingdom | | Voice; Season 1 episode 1: "Super Duper Dance Party" |
| 2017 | The Mist | Benedict Raven | 3 episodes |
| 2017 | Frankie Drake Mysteries | Abraham Amory | Season 1 episode 1: "Mother of Pearl" |
| 2019 | From Friend to Fiancé | Patrick Mulligan | TV movie |
| 2019 | Let's Go Luna! | Accordion Hans | Voice; Season 2 episode 5: "The Big Squeeze/Meet the Presses" |
| 2019 | Carter | Eugene Wallace | Season 2 episode 4: "Harley Gets an Office Job" |
| 2020 | Elinor Wonders Why | Mr. Hippo | Voice; Episode 14: "The Paper Trail/Bath Time" |
| 2020 | Remy & Boo | Poppy | Voice; Main role; 14 episodes |
| 2021 | Blue's Clues & You! | Bunny Bob | Voice; Season 2 episode 10: "Blue's Big Dance Party" |
| 2021 | The Good Doctor | Artie Hill | Season 4 episode 17: "Letting Go" |
| 2022 | Sago Mini Friends | Jasper | |

=== Video games ===
Video games
| Year | Title | Role | Notes |
|---|---|---|---|
| 2000 | Star Trek: Voyager – Elite Force | Crewman Chell | Voice |

== Awards and nominations ==
McGrath was nominated two years in a row (1989 and 1990) for a Gemini Award for My Secret Identity. The first time was for Best Performance by a Lead Actor in a Continuing Dramatic Role, and the second time was for Best Writing in a Dramatic Series (shared with Michael O'Connell, father of My Secret Identity lead Jerry).
