= Stephen Hillenburg =

American animator and educator (1961–2018)

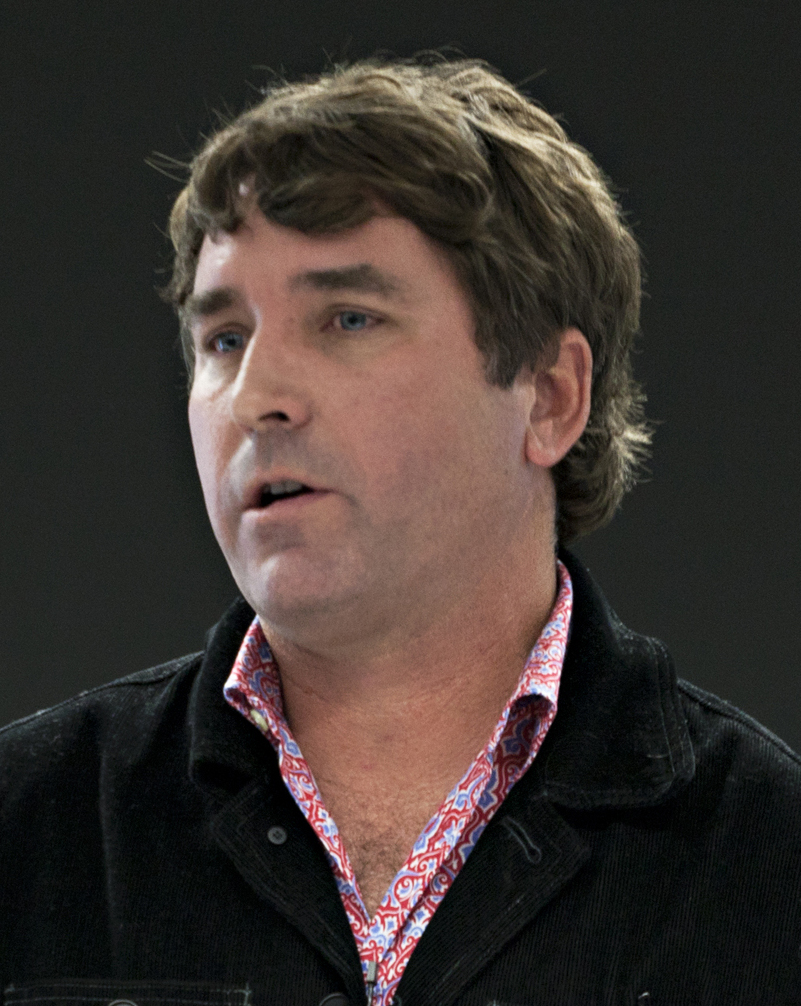
- Hillenburg in 2011
- Born: Stephen McDannell Hillenburg; August 21, 1961; Lawton, Oklahoma, U.S.
- Died: November 26, 2018 (aged 57); San Marino, California, U.S.
- Education: Humboldt State University (BS); California Institute of the Arts (MFA)
- Occupations: Animator; writer; producer; director; voice actor; marine biologist
- Years active: 1984–2018
- Notable work: SpongeBob SquarePants (1999–2004, 2014–2018); Rocko's Modern Life (1993–1996)
- Spouse: Karen Umland (m. 1998)
- Children: 1
- Scientific career
- Fields: Marine biology
- Workplaces: Orange County Marine Institute

Stephen McDannell Hillenburg (August 21, 1961 – November 26, 2018) was an American animator, writer, producer, director, voice actor, and marine biology educator. He is best known for creating the animated television series SpongeBob SquarePants for Nickelodeon in 1999. The show has become the fourth longest-running American animated series. He also provided the original voice of Patchy the Pirate's pet, Potty the Parrot.

Hillenburg was born in Lawton, Oklahoma and grew up in Anaheim, California. He became fascinated with the ocean as a child and developed an interest in art. He began a career in 1984, instructing marine biology at the Orange County Marine Institute, where he wrote and illustrated The Intertidal Zone, an informative picture book about tide-pool animals, which he used to educate his students. After two years of teaching, he enrolled at California Institute of the Arts in Santa Clarita in 1989 to pursue a career in animation. He was later offered a job on the Nickelodeon animated television series Rocko's Modern Life (1993–1996) after the success of his 1992 short films The Green Beret and Wormholes, which were made as part of his studies.

In 1994, Hillenburg began developing The Intertidal Zone characters and concepts for what became SpongeBob SquarePants, which has aired continuously since 1999. He also directed The SpongeBob SquarePants Movie (2004), which he originally intended to be the series finale. He then resigned as showrunner, but remained credited as executive producer on subsequent seasons (even after his death). He later resumed creating short films including Hollywood Blvd., USA (2013). He co-wrote the story for the second film adaptation of the series, The SpongeBob Movie: Sponge Out of Water (2015), and received a posthumous executive producer credit for the third film, The SpongeBob Movie: Sponge on the Run (2020).

Besides his two Emmy Awards and six Annie Awards for SpongeBob SquarePants, Hillenburg also received other recognitions, such as an accolade from Heal the Bay for his efforts in elevating marine life awareness and the Television Animation Award from the National Cartoonists Society. He was diagnosed with amyotrophic lateral sclerosis (ALS) in 2017, but continued working on SpongeBob for as long as possible. He died on November 26, 2018, at the age of 57.

== Early life and education ==
Stephen McDannell Hillenburg was born on August 21, 1961 at Fort Sill, a United States Army base in Lawton, Oklahoma, where his father, Kelly Nathaniel Hillenburg Jr. (July 16, 1936 – August 30, 2006), worked for the military; Kelly Hillenburg was a Methodist. Stephen's mother, Nancy (née Dufour), taught visually impaired students and came from a Methodist family. When he was a year old, the family moved to Orange County, California, where his father began a career as a draftsman and designer in the aerospace industry. His younger brother, Bryan, eventually became a draftsman/designer as well.

When an interviewer asked Stephen Hillenburg what he was like as a child, he replied that he was "probably well-meaning and naive like all kids." His passion for sea life can be traced to his childhood, when films by Jacques Cousteau, a French oceanographer, made a strong impression on him. Hillenburg said that Cousteau "provided a view into that world", which he had not known existed. He liked to explore tide pools as a child, bringing home objects that "should have been left there and that ended up dying and smelling really bad."

"I've always been interested in art and making things, but I chose not to go to art school because I thought I needed to do something else. Art was a tough way to make a living. I've always done both. I just kind of figured that the marine biology would be a career and the art would be something I did for my own self-expression."

— Stephen Hillenburg

Hillenburg also developed his interest in art at a young age. His first drawing was of an orange slice. An illustration which he drew in third grade, depicting "a bunch of army men ... kissing and hugging instead of fighting", brought him the first praise for his artwork, when his teacher commended it. "Of course, this is 1970... She liked it because, I mean, obviously that was in the middle of [the Vietnam War]. She was, I would imagine, not a hundred percent for the war like a lot of people then. ... I had no idea about the implications, really, because I just thought it was a funny idea. I remember that still, that moment when she said, 'oh my gosh, look at that'", Hillenburg elaborated. It was then when he knew he "had some [creative] skill". He asserted that his artistry came from his mother's side, despite his father being a draftsman, noting that his maternal grandmother was "really, really gifted" and a "great painter". In the 1970s, someone took Hillenburg to the International Tournée of Animation at the Los Angeles County Museum of Art. He was "knocked out" by the foreign animated films, including Dutch animator Paul Driessen's The Killing of an Egg (1977). "That was the film that I thought was uniquely strange and that lodged itself in my head early on.", he recounted.

Hillenburg's 1979 Senior yearbook photo at Savanna High School

He attended Savanna High School in Anaheim, California, saying that he was a "band geek" who played the trumpet. At age 15, he snorkeled for the first time; Hillenburg took part in a "dive program" at Woods Coves in Laguna Beach, as part of the Regional Occupational Program at Savanna. This experience, as well as subsequent dives, reinforced his interest in and led to his decision to study marine biology in college. (Note: Attributed to multiple references:) "The switch clicked and I decided I wanted to be a marine biologist, but I also liked being an artist." Some of his high-school teachers, who knew of his interest in art and fascination with the ocean, advised him otherwise, saying: "You should just draw fish." However, the idea of drawing fish seemed boring to him and he was more riveted by "making weird, little paintings". During a few summers after finishing high school, he worked as a fry cook and lobster boiler at a fast-food seafood restaurant in Maine (this later inspired SpongeBob SquarePants's occupation in the television series).

Hillenburg went to Humboldt State University in Arcata, California, as a marine-science major. He minored in art and said "[he] blossomed as a painter in Humboldt." In 1984, he earned his bachelor's degree in natural-resource planning and interpretation, with an emphasis on marine resources. He intended to take a master's degree, but said it would be in art: "Initially I think I assumed that if I went to school for art I would never have any way of making a living, so I thought it might be smarter to keep art my passion and hobby and study something else. But by the time I got to the end of my undergrad work, I realized I should be in art."

== Early career ==
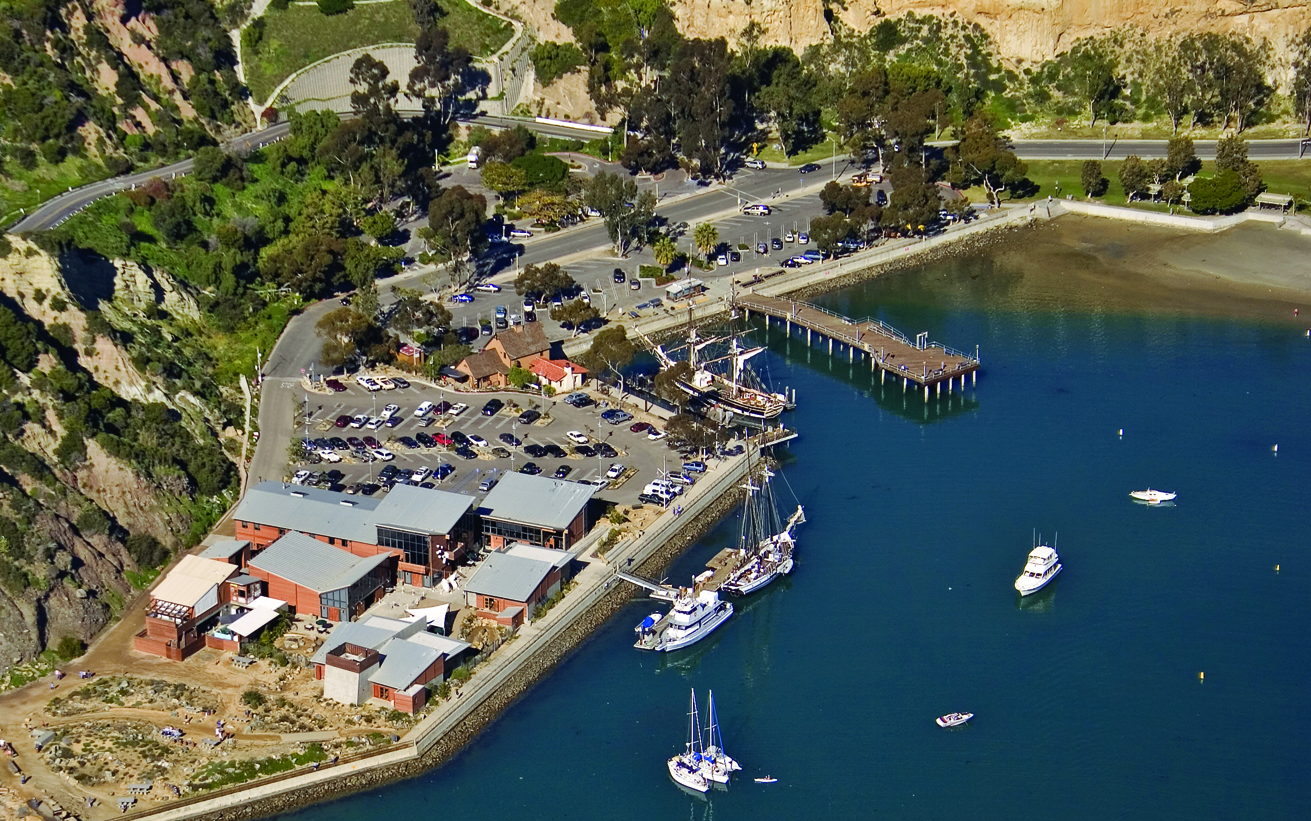
Hillenburg taught marine ocean biology to visitors of the Orange County Marine Institute (pictured) in Dana Point, California, during the mid-1980s.

After graduating from college, Hillenburg held various jobs in 1984, including as a park service attendant in Utah and an art director in San Francisco, before landing the job he wanted: teaching children. He hoped to work in a national park on the coast, and eventually found a job at the Orange County Marine Institute (now the Ocean Institute), an organization in Dana Point, California, dedicated to educating the public about marine science and maritime history. Hillenburg was a marine biology teacher there for three years: "We taught tide-pool ecology, nautical history, diversity and adaptation. Working there, I saw how enamored kids are with undersea life, especially with tide-pool creatures." He stayed at the Dana Point Marina and was also a staff artist. Although "[i]t was a great experience" for him, he realized he was more interested in art than his chosen profession.

While working there, one of the educational directors asked him if he would be interested in creating an educational comic book about the animal life of tidal pools. He created a comic called The Intertidal Zone, which he used to teach his students. It featured anthropomorphic forms of sea life, many of which would evolve into SpongeBob SquarePants characters, including "Bob the Sponge", the comic's co-host, who resembled a realistic sea sponge, as opposed to his later SpongeBob SquarePants character, a sea sponge whose stylized square shape resembles a kitchen sponge. He tried to get the comic published, but the publishers he approached turned him down.

During that time, Hillenburg also started attending animation festivals such as the International Tournée of Animation and Spike and Mike's Festival of Animation, where student films from the California Institute of the Arts (colloquially called CalArts) were shown. He determined that he wanted to pursue a career in the field. He had planned to take a master's degree in art, but instead of "going back to school for painting", he left his job in 1987 to become an animator.

Hillenburg enrolled in CalArts's Experimental Animation Program in 1989. About the decision, he said, "Changing careers like that is scary, but the irony is that animation is a pretty healthy career right now and science education is more of a struggle." He studied under Jules Engel, the founding director of the program, whom he considered his "Art Dad" and mentor. Impressed by The Intertidal Zone, Engel accepted him into the program. Hillenburg said, "[Engel] also was a painter, so I think he saw my paintings and could easily say, 'Oh, this guy could fit in to this program.' I don't have any [prior experience in] animation really." Hillenburg graduated in 1992, earning a Master of Fine Arts in experimental animation. During his time at CalArts, he briefly drew comics for the surfing magazine KEMA in 1990.

== Influences ==
Hillenburg's graphic influences were Mike Kelley, George Herriman, E. C. Segar, Bill Watterson, Dr. Seuss, Max Fleischer, Jay Ward, Chuck Jones, Tex Avery, Bob Clampett, Matt Groening, Jules Engel, Richard Condie, Joe Murray, and John Kricfalusi; the latter two inspired many close-up shots of grotesque and extremely detailed drawings in several SpongeBob episodes. Charlie Chaplin, Buster Keaton, Laurel & Hardy, The Three Stooges, W.C. Fields, Jerry Lewis, Jacques Cousteau, Monty Python, Jim Henson's The Muppets and Paul Reubens' Pee-wee Herman as being his comedic influences. He mainly liked the film George Dunning and Heinz Edelmann's Yellow Submarine made in 1968 and also Paul Driessen and Nico Crama's short film The Killing of an Egg. He also cited Ween's The Mollusk as a direct inspiration for SpongeBob.

== Animation career ==
=== Early works ===
Shots from The Green Beret (top) and Wormholes (bottom)

Hillenburg made his first animated works, short films The Green Beret (1991) and Wormholes (1992), while at CalArts. The Green Beret was about a physically challenged Girl Scout with enormous fists who toppled houses and destroyed neighborhoods while trying to sell Girl Scout cookies. Wormholes was his seven-minute thesis film, about the theory of relativity. He described the latter as "a poetic animated film based on relativistic phenomena" in his grant proposal in 1991 to the Princess Grace Foundation, which assists emerging artists in American theater, dance, and film. The foundation agreed to fund the effort, providing Hillenburg with a Graduate Film Scholarship. "It meant a lot.", he said in 2003. "They funded one of the projects I'm most proud of, even with SpongeBob. It provided me the opportunity just to make a film that was personal, and what I would call independent, and free of some of the commercial needs." Wormholes was shown at several international animation festivals, including the Annecy International Animated Film Festival, the Hiroshima International Animation Festival, the Los Angeles International Animation Celebration, the International Short Film Festival Oberhausen, and the Ottawa International Animation Festival, where it won Best Concept. LA Weekly called the film "road-trippy" and "Zap-comical", while Manohla Dargis of The New York Times called it "inventive".

Hillenburg explained that "anything goes" in experimental animation. Although this allowed him to explore alternatives to conventional methods of filmmaking, he still ventured to employ "an industry style"; he preferred to traditionally animate his films (where each frame is drawn by hand) rather than, for instance, make cartoons "by filming piles of sand changing". He made at least one other short film as an animation student, titled Animation Diary, which was made up of 365 drawings made during the span of 1991 (with one drawing per day).

=== Rocko's Modern Life ===
Hillenburg's first professional job in the animation business was as a director on Rocko's Modern Life (1993–1996), Nickelodeon's first in-house cartoon production. He "ended up finding work in the industry and got a job" at the television network after he met the show's creator, Joe Murray, at the 1992 Ottawa International Animation Festival, where Wormholes and Murray's My Dog Zero were both in competition. Murray, who was looking for people to direct Rocko's Modern Life at the time, saw Hillenburg's film and offered him a directorial role on the television series. He "[had] friends that [gave him] a hard time about [the offer]. ... but doors opened when [he] stepped into the animation world", so he accepted it. He "was planning on being a starving artist": "[I spent] several thousand dollars to make a film and [realized] I may not make it back—I had loans out. Fortunately, Joe Murray saw my film ... and he took a huge chance.", Hillenburg related.

Hillenburg worked closely with Murray on Rocko's Modern Life for its whole run on the air. Aside from directing, he also produced, wrote and storyboarded for some episodes, and served as the executive story editor. In particular, the third-season episode "Fish-N-Chumps" was co-written and directed by Hillenburg, and involved Rocko, Heffer, and Filburt going on a fishing trip, oblivious to the fact that a pair of anthropomorphic sea creatures are attempting to catch them from underwater; this would foreshadow his later work with SpongeBob. In 1995, during the fourth and final season of Rocko, Hillenburg was promoted to creative director, where he helped oversee pre- and post-production. Working on the series enabled him to repay his loans. He later related that he "learned a great deal about writing and producing animation for TV" from his stint on Rocko's Modern Life.

=== SpongeBob SquarePants ===
==== Creation ====
Some evidence shows that the idea for SpongeBob SquarePants dates back to 1986, during Hillenburg's time at the Orange County Marine Institute. He indicated that children's television series such as Mighty Mouse: The New Adventures (1987–1988) and Pee-wee's Playhouse (1986–1991) "sparked something in [him]." He continued, "I don't know if this is true for everybody else, but it always seems like, for me, I'll start thinking about something and it takes about ten years to actually have it happen, or have someone else believe in it... It took me a few years to get [SpongeBob SquarePants] together."

During the production of Rocko's Modern Life, Martin Olson, one of the writers, read The Intertidal Zone and encouraged Hillenburg to create a television series with a similar concept. At that point, he had not even considered creating his own series: "After watching Joe [Murray] tear his hair out a lot, dealing with all the problems that came up, I thought I would never want to produce a show of my own." However, he realized that if he ever did, this would be the best approach: "For all those years it seemed like I was doing these two totally separate things. I wondered what it all meant. I didn't see a synthesis. It was great when [my two interests] all came together in [a show]. I felt relieved that I hadn't wasted a lot of time doing something that I then abandoned to do something else. It has been pretty rewarding.", Hillenburg said in 2002. He said that he finally decided to create a series as he was driving to the beach on the Santa Monica Freeway one day.

"It finally dawned on me that if I was going to do my own show, all those things I lectured about and obsessed about would make for an interesting world."

— Stephen Hillenburg

As he was developing the show's concept, Hillenburg remembered his teaching experience at the Orange County Marine Institute and how mesmerized children were by tide-pool animals, including crabs, octopuses, starfish, Cyclops copepod and sponges. It came to him that the series should take place underwater, with a focus on those creatures: "I wanted to create a small town underwater where the characters were more like us than like fish. They have fire. They take walks. They drive. They have pets and holidays." It suited what Hillenburg liked for a show, "something that was fantastic but believable." He also wanted his series to stand out from most popular cartoons of the time exemplified by buddy comedies such as The Ren & Stimpy Show (1991–1995). As a result, he decided to focus on one main character: the weirdest sea creature that he could think of. This led him to the sponge: "I wanted to do a show about a character that was an innocent, and so I focused on a sea sponge because it's a funny animal, a strange one." In 1994, Hillenburg began to further develop some characters from The Intertidal Zone, including Bob the Sponge, who resembles a realistic sea sponge; at first, Hillenburg continued this design because it "was the correct thing to do biologically as a marine-science teacher". In determining the new character's personality, he drew inspiration from innocent, childlike figures that he enjoyed, such as Charlie Chaplin, Laurel and Hardy, Jerry Lewis, Pee-wee Herman, Abbott and Costello, and The Three Stooges. While Hillenburg "retained the idea of a living sea sponge", he soon considered giving the character a square shape (like a kitchen sponge), and realized that this idea would match the character's square personality perfectly: "[I]t looked so funny. I think as far as cartoon language goes he was easier to recognize. He seemed to fit the character type I was looking for—a somewhat nerdy, squeaky clean oddball." To voice the central character of the series, Hillenburg turned to Tom Kenny, whose career in animation had begun with his role in Rocko's Modern Life. Elements of Kenny's own personality were employed in further developing the character.

While pitching the cartoon to executives at Nickelodeon, Hillenburg donned a Hawaiian shirt, brought along an "underwater terrarium with models of the characters", and played Hawaiian music to set the theme. Nickelodeon executive Eric Coleman described the setup as "pretty amazing". Although Derek Drymon, creative director of SpongeBob SquarePants, described the pitch as stressful, he said it went "very well". Nickelodeon approved and gave Hillenburg money to produce the show.

==== Broadcast ====
SpongeBob SquarePants is Nickelodeon's first original Saturday-morning cartoon. It first aired as a preview on May 1, 1999, and officially premiered on July 17 of the same year. Hillenburg noted that the show's premise "is that innocence prevails—which I don't think it always does in real life." It has received positive reviews from critics, and has been noted for its appeal to different age groups. James Poniewozik of Time magazine described the titular character as "the anti-Bart Simpson, temperamentally and physically: his head is as squared-off and neat as Bart's is unruly, and he has a personality to match—conscientious, optimistic and blind to the faults in the world and those around him." On the other hand, The New York Times critic Joyce Millman said that the show "is clever without being impenetrable to young viewers and goofy without boring grown-ups to tears. It's the most charming toon on television, and one of the weirdest [...]. Like Pee-wee's Playhouse, SpongeBob joyfully dances on the fine line between childhood and adulthood, guilelessness and camp, the warped and the sweet."

SpongeBob SquarePants was an immediate hit. Within its first month on air, it overtook Pokémon (1997–present) as the highest-rated Saturday morning children's series. By the end of 2001, the show boasted the highest ratings of any children's series on television. Nickelodeon began adding SpongeBob SquarePants to its Monday-through-Thursday prime-time block. This programming change increased the number of older viewers significantly. By May 2002, the show's total viewership reached more than 61 million, 20 million of which were aged 18 to 49. Hillenburg did not expect the show would be very popular even to adults: "I never imagined that it would get to this point. When you set out to do a show about a sponge, you can't anticipate this kind of craze. We just try to make ourselves laugh, then ask if it's appropriate for children. I can tell you that we hoped it would be liked by adults. But we really thought the best we could hope for was a college audience." SpongeBob SquarePants has gone on to become the longest-running series on Nickelodeon. "Ten years. I never imagined working on the show to this date and this long. It never was possible to conceive that [...]. I really figured we might get a season and a cult following, and that might be it.", Hillenburg said in 2009 during the show's tenth anniversary. Its popularity has made it a media franchise, which is the most-distributed property of MTV Networks. As of 2015, it has generated $25 billion in merchandising revenue.

==== Departure ====
In 2002, Hillenburg halted production of the show after the third season was completed to focus on the making of The SpongeBob SquarePants Movie which was released in 2004: "I don't want to try and do a movie and the series at the same time. We have 60 episodes and that is probably as many as [Nickelodeon] really needs. It is a standard number for a show like this. I have done a little research and people say it is just crazy doing a series and movie at the same time. I would rather concentrate on doing a good job on the movie," he noted. He directed the film from a story that he conceived with five other writer-animators from the series: Paul Tibbitt, Derek Drymon, Aaron Springer, Kent Osborne, and Tim Hill. The writers created a mythical hero's quest: the search for a stolen crown, which brings SpongeBob and his best friend Patrick to the surface. In 2003, during the production of The SpongeBob SquarePants Movie, his mentor Jules Engel died at the age of 94. Hillenburg dedicated the film to his memory. He said that Engel "truly was the most influential artistic person in [his] life." The SpongeBob SquarePants Movie grossed $140 million worldwide, and received positive reviews from critics. The review-aggregator website Rotten Tomatoes rates it 68 percent positive based on 125 reviews, with an average rating of 6.2/10. Its consensus states in summary, "Surreally goofy and entertaining for both children and their parents."

"It reached to a point where I felt I'd contributed a lot and said what I wanted to say. At that point, the show needed new blood and so I selected Paul [Tibbitt] to produce. I totally trusted him. I always enjoyed the way he captured the SpongeBob character's sense of humor. And as a writer, you have to move on—I'm developing new projects."

— Stephen Hillenburg on leaving SpongeBob SquarePants as the showrunner

After completing the film, Hillenburg wanted to end the series "so [it] wouldn't jump the shark." "We're working on episodes 40 through 60 right now, and I always looked at that as a typical run for an animated show. [The Ren & Stimpy Show] lasted about that long, for example. And I thought now was a good time to step aside and look at a different project. I personally think it's good not to go to the point where people don't want to see your show anymore," Hillenburg said in 2002. However, Nickelodeon wanted to produce more episodes: "The show was such a cash cow for the station that it couldn't afford not to," storyboard director Sam Henderson observed. Initially Hillenburg doubted that the network would continue the show without him, saying: "I think [Nickelodeon executives] respect that my contribution is important. I think they would want to maintain the original concept and quality." Consequently, he resigned as the showrunner and appointed his trusted staff member Paul Tibbitt to the role. Although he no longer had a direct involvement producing SpongeBob SquarePants, he retained his position as an executive producer and maintained an advisory role, reviewing each episode. Tibbitt started out as a supervising producer but rose up to executive producer when Hillenburg went into semi-retirement in 2004. While he was on the show, he voiced Potty the Parrot and sat in with Derek Drymon at the record studio to direct the voice actors while they were recording. During the fourth season, Tibbitt took on voicing for Potty, while Andrea Romano replaced the two as the voice director.

In 2014, Tibbitt announced on his Twitter account that Hillenburg would return to the show. However, he did not specify what position the former showrunner would hold. As early as 2012, Hillenburg had already been contributing to another film based on the series, which was first reported in 2011 and officially announced the following year, with Tibbitt as director. Tibbitt also wrote the story with Hillenburg, who "[had] been in the studio everyday working with [the crew]." Besides writing, Hillenburg also executive-produced. He said in 2014: "Actually when [the film] wraps, I want to get back to the show. ... it is getting harder and harder to come up with stories. So Paul [Tibbitt] and I are really going to brainstorm and come up with fresh material." Called The SpongeBob Movie: Sponge Out of Water, the second film adaptation was released in 2015 to positive critical reception, currently holding a Rotten Tomatoes approval rating of 80 percent and an average rating of 6.5/10. It earned $323.4 million worldwide, becoming the second highest-grossing film based on an animated television show at the time, behind The Simpsons Movie (2007).

=== Other pursuits ===
United Plankton Pictures, Inc.
- Type: Private
- Industry: Entertainment
- Founded: April 1, 1998; 28 years ago
- Founder: Stephen Hillenburg
- Headquarters: Burbank, California, U.S.
- Key people: Karen Hillenburg (CEO)
- Products: SpongeBob SquarePants

A still from Hollywood Blvd., USA

On April 1, 1998, Hillenburg formed United Plankton Pictures, Inc., an independent television and film production company, which produces SpongeBob SquarePants and related media. From 2011 to 2018, the company published SpongeBob Comics, a comic-book series based on the cartoon. Hillenburg announced the venture in a 2011 press release, where he said, "I'm hoping that fans will enjoy finally having a SpongeBob comic book from me." Various cartoonists, including James Kochalka, Hilary Barta, Graham Annable, Gregg Schigiel, and Jacob Chabot, have contributed to issues of the comic.

According to Jeff Lenburg, in his book Who's Who in Animated Cartoons, Hillenburg was co-writing and co-directing a second animated feature film based on Rob Zombie's comic-book series, The Haunted World of El Superbeasto, which was slated for a 2006 release. He helped to write Diggs Tailwagger, a 2007 pilot by Derek Drymon.

In 2010, he began working on Hollywood Blvd., USA, a new short film for animation festivals. In making the two-minute film, he videotaped people walking and animated them in walk cycles. Hillenburg said in 2012, "I hope to get [the film] done. It takes forever." He was aiming to finish it that fall. In 2013, three years after production began, Hollywood Blvd., USA was released to festivals. Hillenburg characterized it as a "personal film" and said that "it's not a narrative. It's just really about people in our town."

== Personal life ==
In 1998, Hillenburg married Karen Jean Umland, a chef who taught at the New School of Cooking in Culver City. (Note: Attributed to multiple references:) He deemed her the funniest person he knew, and he named the SpongeBob character Karen Plankton after her. Karen gave birth to a son, Clay, also in 1998. Hillenburg lived in Hollywood and Pasadena before residing with his family in San Marino, California until his death. (Note: Attributed to multiple references:) His hobbies included surfing, snorkeling, scuba diving, swimming, birdwatching and performing "noisy rock music" on his guitar. (Note: Attributed to multiple references:) He would play music with his son, a drummer, which served as a bonding experience for Hillenburg.

According to his colleagues, he was "a perfectionist workaholic", and was also known for his private nature. Julia Pistor, co-producer of The SpongeBob SquarePants Movie, noted that Hillenburg was "very shy". She said: "He doesn't want people to know about his life or family. He's just a really funny, down-to-earth guy with a dry sense of humor who puts his family first and keeps us on our toes in keeping our corporate integrity." Hillenburg said about himself: "I make animation because I like to draw and create things. I have no real interest to be on camera or to be a celebrity. It's not that I don't like people, but I like having my privacy."

=== Philanthropy ===
Hillenburg, with his wife Karen, endowed numerous projects and organizations through the United Plankton Charitable Trust, which they established in 2005, named after Hillenburg's United Plankton Pictures. It supports areas of their personal interest, giving under $500,000 annually as of 2017. Grantees include large, established arts-related organizations such as the Los Angeles County Museum of Art, and the Society for the Activation of Social Space through Art and Sound, in which Karen is co-chair. Health accounts for most of their grantmaking; they had gifted Planned Parenthood (where Karen has been on the board of directors as of 2014) and the National Multiple Sclerosis Society, among other national health organizations.

In education, they have donated to schools, including the Polytechnic School in Pasadena (which their son attended), CalArts, and Humboldt State University. Donations to the latter helped fund the HSU Marine Lab and the Stephen Hillenburg Marine Science Research Award Endowment, which the couple created in 2018 to support the university's marine-science research students. The previous year, the Princess Grace Foundation introduced the Stephen Hillenburg Animation Scholarship, an annual grant from the Hillenburgs to emerging animators.

== Illness and death ==
Hillenburg disclosed to Variety magazine in March 2017 that he had been diagnosed with amyotrophic lateral sclerosis (ALS, also known as Lou Gehrig's disease), though he also stated that he would continue to work on SpongeBob SquarePants for as long as he was able. He added: "My family and I are grateful for the outpouring of love and support. We ask that our sincere request for privacy be honored during this time." Hillenburg was in the early stages of the disease at the time, according to a source close to him. During his last days as executive producer, he had difficulty speaking, and it ultimately got to the point where he stopped going to his office due to the progression of the illness.

Hillenburg died on November 26, 2018, at the age of 57. He died at his home in San Marino, California, with his ashes scattered in the Pacific Ocean off the coast of California the next day.

The third hour-long SpongeBob SquarePants TV special, titled SpongeBob’s Big Birthday Blowout, was released in 2019, followed by the third theatrical film, The SpongeBob Movie: Sponge on the Run, in 2020. Both of these projects were dedicated to Hillenburg, who also served as executive producer on the theatrical film.

== Legacy ==
During the halftime show for Super Bowl LIII, the performing band Maroon 5 arranged to use a clip from the SpongeBob episode "Band Geeks" (which uses the song "Sweet Victory" as part of a spoof of a football halftime show) during their show as a means to pay tribute to Hillenburg. A full clip of the "Sweet Victory" song, including a dedication to Hillenburg, was played inside Mercedes-Benz Stadium during vacant hours. The song was later included in a promo for ViacomCBS's Paramount+ streaming service during Super Bowl LV. A full, all-CGI version was broadcast before Nickelodeon's broadcast of Super Bowl LVIII.

The day after Super Bowl LIII, the Dallas Stars of the National Hockey League uploaded on their Twitter page a modified version of the full "Sweet Victory" sequence, in which the band's uniforms were altered from red to green to match the Stars's colors, with the title "The #SuperBowl halftime show fans deserve". The Stars's video had previously been shown during their February 1 game against the Minnesota Wild.

In 2019, a spin-off of SpongeBob SquarePants, Kamp Koral, began production, featuring younger versions of the characters attending summer camp. Former showrunner Paul Tibbitt stated that Hillenburg would have disliked the idea; he commented, "Steve would always say to me, 'You know, one of these days, they're going to want to make SpongeBob Babies. That's when I'm out of here.'" Tibbitt also released a statement stating, "I do not mean any disrespect to my colleagues who are working on this show ... [but] they all know full well Steve would have hated this." The concept of Kamp Koral came from a season 12 meeting in October 2018, a month before Hillenburg died. Hillenburg is credited as the creator of Kamp Koral, and is credited on other spin-offs as the characters' creator.

== Awards and honors ==
In 1992, one of Hillenburg's early works, Wormholes, won for Best Concept at the Ottawa International Animation Festival. For SpongeBob SquarePants, Hillenburg was nominated for 17 Emmy Awards, winning in the categories of Outstanding Special Class Animated Program and Outstanding Sound Editing – Animation in 2010 and 2014, respectively. The show has also received several other awards and nominations, including 17 Annie Award nominations, winning six times, as well as winning two British Academy Children's Awards, out of four nominations. In 2002, SpongeBob SquarePants won its first TCA Award for Outstanding Achievement in Children's Programming nomination.

In 2001, Heal the Bay, an environmental nonprofit organization, honored Hillenburg with its Walk the Talk award. He was recognized for raising public awareness of marine life through SpongeBob SquarePants. The following year, Hillenburg was given the Television Animation Award from the National Cartoonists Society, and the Princess Grace Statue Award from the Princess Grace Foundation. In 2018, Hillenburg received the Winsor McCay Award at the 45th Annie Awards, and a special recognition at the 45th Daytime Emmy Awards "for his contribution and impact made in the animation field and within the broadcast industry."

The marine demosponge species Clathria hillenburgi, known from mangrove habitats off the coast of Paraíba, Brazil, was named in honor of Stephen Hillenburg.

On November 18, 2021, Hillenburg was honored with a bench and historical plaque at his alma mater Savannah High School in Anaheim, California. The project was a collaboration between the Hillenburg family, Anaheim Historical Society, and YouTube personality Griffin Hansen. Karen Hillenburg specifically chose a bright yellow bench that "she thought perfectly captured her husband's warmth and goofiness". The memorial was dedicated one day before Savanna High School's 60th anniversary at a school-wide assembly hosted by Hansen and principal Michael Pooley. The event was attended by Karen and Clay Hillenburg, as well as members of SpongeBob SquarePants' cast and crew including Tom Kenny, Jill Talley, Rodger Bumpass, Bill Fagerbakke, Clancy Brown, Mr. Lawrence, Marc Ceccarelli, and Derek Drymon.

== Filmography ==
=== Film ===
Title	Year	Role	Notes	Ref.
The Green Beret (short film)	1991	—	Student film: Director; Writer; Animator	
Animation Diary (short film)	1992	—	Student film: Director; Writer; Animator	
Wormholes (short film)	1992	—	Student film: Director; Writer; Animator	
The SpongeBob SquarePants Movie	2004	Parrot (voice)	Director; Writer; Story; Producer; Storyboard artist	
Hollywood Blvd., USA (short film)	2013	—	Director; Producer	
The SpongeBob Movie: Sponge Out of Water	2015	Baby in Stroller (voice)	Story writer; Executive producer	
The SpongeBob Movie: Sponge on the Run	2020	—	Executive producer; posthumous release	
Order Up (short film)	2025	—	Executive producer; posthumous release	

=== Television ===
Title	Year	Role	Notes	Ref.
Rocko's Modern Life	1993–1996	—	Creative director; Supervising producer; Director; Executive story editor; Storyboard artist; Storyboard director; Writer	
SpongeBob SquarePants	1999–2018	Potty the Parrot (voice; 2000–2004); Director (voice, as Steve Hillenburg); Man Inside the Treasure Chest (physical cameo)	Creator; Executive producer; Showrunner (season 1–3); Voice director (season 1–3); Voice actor (season 2–3); Writer (season 1–3); Storyboard director (Help Wanted); SpongeBob's Big Birthday Blowout dedicated to his memory	
Diggs Tailwagger	2007	—	Additional writer	
The Mighty B!	2008	Special thanks	Episode 1.1: "So Happy Together/Sweet Sixteenth"	
Square Roots: The Story of SpongeBob SquarePants	2009	Himself	Documentary	
Welcome to the Wayne	2017	Special thanks	Episode 1.6: "Like No Other Market on Earth"	
Kamp Koral: SpongeBob's Under Years	2021	—	Executive producer, posthumous release	
