= Frank the Wrabbit =

Franky the Wrabbit
- Directed by: John Weldon
- Written by: John Weldon
- Produced by: Marcy Page; David Verrall
- Narrated by: Paul Hecht
- Music by: Chris Crilly
- Animation by: John Weldon
- Production company: National Film Board of Canada
- Release date: 1998
- Running time: 9 minutes
- Country: Canada

Frank the Wrabbit is a 1998 Canadian animated short film by Academy Award-winning animator John Weldon. The film centres on a highly intelligent rabbit with a philosophical worldview and a quick wit to survive and prosper even when the farmer's carrots disappeared.

The film had its genesis in a bedtime story that Weldon made up for his young daughter.

The film received a Genie Award nomination for Best Animated Short at the 19th Genie Awards in 1999.

In 1999, it was one of eight National Film Board of Canada projects criticized by Reform Party of Canada MP John Williams as a "waste of taxpayers' money".
