= To Be (film) =

- Directed by: John Weldon
- Written by: John Weldon
- Produced by: David Verrall; Douglas MacDonald (executive producer)
- Starring: Kim Handysides; Howard Ryshpan
- Music by: John F. Weldon
- Distributed by: National Film Board of Canada
- Release date: 1990
- Running time: 10 min., 5 sec.
- Country: Canada
- Language: English

To Be is a Canadian animated short film released in 1990 and directed by John Weldon, who also composed its music. "To Be" was nominated for a Palme d'Or for best short film in 1990. From 1997 to 2002, the film was shown on Cartoon Network as part of the O Canada anthology series of National Film Board of Canada films. The film concerns an ontological problem known as the teletransportation paradox.

== Plot ==
The cartoon opens as the narrator sings about how her thoughts of being continue to haunt her, keeping her from sleep. After this introduction, we meet the character in earnest and her narrative begins (henceforth continuing throughout the story while accompanied occasionally by the semi-audible dialog of the characters):

One day, she was invited by an eminent scientist to a public exhibition of his new invention, a teleporter. On the day of this demonstration, the main character takes her place in a crowd gathered to watch this miracle of science. The transporter sits on a stage and comprises two booths, each resembling an icebox with antennae; the scientist calls his first volunteer, a man dressed in purple. The subject is shut in the booth at stage right and the inventor initiates the process, superficially just a few seconds of mechanical noise followed by a small burst in the booth entered by the subject. Out of the booth stage-left walks the man in purple; applause and astonishment abound. The lady-protagonist, at first thinking the display nothing more than a magic trick, asks the scientist for an explanation of the process; he bribes her to try his device, but she demands her explanation. By way of a film, he offers one that involves radio waves, but she remains suspicious. He admits his lie and (the crowd having apparently dispersed) explains that the stage-right booth gathers information about the test-subject within it and sends that information to the other booth, which then produces an exact replica of the subject; the first booth then obliterates its human contents. Disgusted, the narratress again refuses to ride in the machine: instead, she asks why it is necessary to destroy the original subject. The inventor explains that if the original were not destroyed, the world would become overpopulated with copies of each person who used the teleporter; the lady contends that the destruction is immoral. Her interlocutor asks if she would have the same concern if a copy were destroyed and posits that it is just as immoral to destroy a copy as not to make one at all! The original and the copy, he asserts, are the same person. After the main character again refuses to ride, she asks the scientist to do so; he offers that he has done so many times, but she persists and he agrees, even with the lady's stipulation that he leave the doors of the booths open. He steps in the first booth; a copy forms in the second; the scientist in the first is annihilated; the copy repeats the process and so does his copy and that copy's copy.

The woman now wants the invention's creator's assurance that the machine is safe; when the clone-scientist assures her he is the creator, she denies it, insisting to his frustration that he is but a copy and the original scientist has long since ceased to exist; his producing identifying documents (and a believing mother!) are of no avail. The lady then recommends the scientist ride the device but this time delaying, for five minutes, the destruction of the original; he agrees and again enters the machine. The original and his twin step out at once and quite enjoy each other's company until the lady asks which of the two is the original: naturally, neither wishes to be destroyed, and so both deny being the one who stepped into the first booth. At the lady's suggestion, a game of chess is to decide which of the two must die: one of the scientists wins and orders his double into the first booth, but the narratress counters the original would more likely be able to defeat his duplicate; thereupon, the lady and the loser force the winner into the booth to face his doom, his panicked right arm still sticking out of the shut door. We hear the same short burst as before. Lady and inventor are overcome with guilt and the latter, exiting in tears, no longer asks his questioner to ride inside the machine. Somber music plays and the narratress sings about her misguided jest; she enters the first booth and begins the process. Out of the second booth steps her likeness; the same burst is heard at the first. Her voice narrates: "I was now a guiltless copy!" As the relieved lady trips merrily away, we hear her hymn to her innocence: "...Bluebird sitting on my head, Aren't you glad my old one's dead? Hello, brook! Good morning, tree! I've just begun to be!"
