= No Problem (1992 film) =

- Directed by: Craig Welch
- Written by: Craig Welch
- Produced by: Marcy Page; Barrie McLean; Eunice MacAulay
- Cinematography: Jacques Avoine; Pierre Landry; Lynda Pelley
- Edited by: Derek Sharplin
- Music by: Denis L. Chartrand; Normand Roger
- Production company: National Film Board of Canada
- Release date: May 1992 (Cannes)
- Running time: 12 min.
- Country: Canada

No Problem is a Canadian animated short film, directed by Craig Welch and released in 1992. The film centres on a lonely man who wants to be in a relationship with a woman, but every time he goes on a date his id and superego both come out to wreck the opportunity.

The film was influenced by the comic style of NFB animators Cordell Barker and Richard Condie.

The film premiered at the 1992 Cannes Film Festival, in competition for the Short Film Palme d'Or. It was a Genie Award nominee for Best Animated Short Film at the 14th Genie Awards in 1993.
