= John Weldon (animator) =

Canadian animator

John Weldon (born May 11, 1945) is a Canadian actor, composer, animator and movie director, known for his National Film Board of Canada (NFB) animated shorts.

Born in Belleville, Ontario, Weldon lives in Montreal, Quebec. Following his retirement from the NFB, Weldon has devoted his time to songwriting and comic books, including a planned comic book series, Ashcan Alley.

== Filmography ==
- What Do You Do? (1976, animator)
- Spinnolio (1977)
- No Apple For Johnny (1977; written, animated and directed)
- Special Delivery (1978; cowritten and directed with Eunice Macaulay)
- The Log Driver's Waltz (1979)
- Emergency Numbers (1984)
- Real Inside (1984)
- Of Dice and Men (1988)
- To Be (1990)
- The Lump (1991)
- Scant Sanity (1996)
- Frank the Wrabbit (1998)
- The Hungry Squid (2001)
- Yo (2003)
- Noël Noël (2003) (script)
- Home Security (2004)

== Awards ==
- Academy Award for Best Animated Short Film for Special Delivery in 1979.
- Nominated for a Golden Palm for Best Short Film for To Be, in 1990.

== See also ==
- Cordell Barker-similar in content
- Richard Condie-similar in content
- Cinema of Canada
