= Marcy Page =

American animation filmmaker

- Born: c. 1950 (age c. 74); California, United States
- Occupation(s): Animator, filmmaker, educator
- Notable work: The End of the World in Four Seasons; How Wings Are Attached to the Backs of Angels; Frank the Wrabbit
- Spouse: Normand Roger

Marcy Page (born c. 1950) is an American animator, film producer and educator.

Page was born and raised in California. She animated her own projects and for several companies, and she taught courses at both San Francisco State University and the California College of Arts before she emigrated to Canada. Her own film Paradisia won awards at many international festivals.

In 1990, Page joined the National Film Board of Canada, where she produced a number of animated films. Most notably, she co-produced the Academy Award-winning films Ryan (2004) and The Danish Poet (2006). She also produced the Academy Award-nominated Madame Tutli-Putli (which won the Le Grand Prix Canal + du meilleur court-métrage at 2007 Cannes Film Festival and co-produced Me and My Moulton (2014) and My Grandmother Ironed the King's Shirts (1999), both nominated for the Academy Award for Best Animated Short Film. During her time at the National Film Board, she has worked on films that have earned over 250 international awards.

Through films like Ryan, Page has encouraged the innovative use of computer technology, as well as stereoscopic films like Munro Ferguson's Falling in Love Again and June.

Page was invited to join the Academy of Motion Picture Arts and Sciences in 2007.

After working at the National Film Board for 24 years, she retired in March 2014. In November 2015, Page received the inaugural Prix René-Jodoin, recognizing exceptional work in Canadian animation.

She is married to film composer Normand Roger, whom she met while working with him on Paradisia.

In 2024, Page was awarded the Winsor McCay Award at that year’s Annie Awards in recognition of her “unparalleled achievement and exceptional contributions to animation”.

== Selected filmography ==
- 1987 - Paradisia (director)
- 1995 - The End of the World in Four Seasons (producer)
- 1996 - How Wings Are Attached to the Backs of Angels (producer)
- 1998 - Frank the Wrabbit
- 2000 - The Boy Who Saw the Iceberg (co-producer)
- 2002 - The Hungry Squid (Producer)
- 2009 - I Want a Dog (co-producer)
- 2009 - The Spine (co-producer)
- 2010 - Higglety Pigglety Pop! or There Must Be More to Life (co-producer)
- 2011 - Wild Life (co-producer)
- 2013 - Subconscious Password (co-producer)
- 2014 - Me and My Moulton (co-producer)
- 2014 - Seth's Dominion (co-producer)
