= The End of the World in Four Seasons =

- Directed by: Paul Driessen
- Produced by: Marcy Page
- Animation by: Paul Driessen
- Production company: National Film Board of Canada
- Release date: August 28, 1995 (FFM)
- Running time: 13 minutes
- Country: Canada

The End of the World in Four Seasons is a Canadian animated short film, directed by Paul Driessen and released in 1995. Set to Antonio Vivaldi's composition The Four Seasons, the film presents several simultaneous yet distinct stories in separate storyboard windows, with events in each panel expanding outward to impact other panels.

The film premiered on August 28, 1995, at the 1995 Montreal World Film Festival, where it won the award for Best Short Film. The film was a Genie Award nominee for Best Theatrical Short Film at the 16th Genie Awards.
