= Glimpses/Impressions =

- Directed by: Jean-François Pouliot
- Screenplay by: Jean-François Pouliot
- Produced by: René Chénier
- Cinematography: Serge Clément; Claude-Simon Langlois
- Edited by: Vicky Daneau
- Music by: Mario Leblanc
- Production company: National Film Board of Canada
- Release date: May 1, 2010 (Shanghai)
- Running time: 05 min 20 s
- Country: Canada

Glimpses/Impressions is a film by Jean-François Pouliot for the Canadian pavilion at Expo 2010 in Shanghai. The 5 minute 20 second-long film depicts 24 hours in the life of an imaginary urban centre, created from composite images from major Canadian cities. The film was created from over 3,000 animated photos, projected onto a large screen with a 150-degree curve.

== Production ==
Glimpses/Impressions was based on a proposal from the Cirque du Soleil, who were contracted by the Department of Canadian Heritage to design the pavilion's exhibitions. It is produced by the National Film Board of Canada.

To create the images for the film, photographers Serge Clément and Claude-Simon Langlois travelled across Canada to take more than 57,000 photographs.

Composer Normand Roger and collaborators Pierre Yves Drapeau and Yves Chartrand scored the film, adapting Mario Leblanc's "Androgyne." The Leblanc composition had been used to inspire the creative team, before ultimately being chosen for the soundtrack.
