= The Lump =

- Directed by: John Weldon
- Written by: John Weldon
- Produced by: David Verrall
- Music by: John Weldon
- Production company: National Film Board of Canada (NFB)
- Release date: 1991
- Running time: 8 minutes
- Country: Canada
- Language: English

The Lump is a short animated film released in 1991. It tells the story of an unattractive and unpopular man named George. One day, a lump appears on his head that looks like an attractive face. By pretending the lump is his real face, he gains fame and fortune, but soon he gets into trouble when he enters into the company of several corrupt politicians.

A National Film Board of Canada film, The Lump was written and directed by John Weldon. It was nominated for the Genie Award for Best Animated Short at the 13th Genie Awards in 1992, and won the Gordon Bruce Award for Humor at the Ottawa International Animation Festival in that year.
