= Mirosława Krajewska =

Polish actress (1940–2023)

- Born: 11 September 1940; Warsaw, General Government (now Poland)
- Died: 6 December 2023 (aged 83)
- Years active: 1963–2017

Mirosława Krajewska (11 September 1940 – 6 December 2023) was a Polish actress. She starred in the 1976 film Brunet wieczorową porą. Krajewska died on 6 December 2023, at the age of 83.

She lent her voice to many cartoon characters, such as the Fairy Godmother in the Polish version of Disney's Cinderella and Granny in Looney Tunes.
