= The Killing of an Egg =

- Directed by: Paul Driessen
- Produced by: Nico Crama
- Color process: Technicolor
- Release date: 1977
- Running time: 3 minutes
- Country: Netherlands
- Language: English

The Killing of an Egg (Dutch title Ei om Zeep, literally "Egg for Soap") is an animated short directed by Paul Driessen and produced by Nico Crama in the Netherlands in 1977.

== Synopsis ==
The film starts with a bald, obese man in a bright yellow shirt preparing to eat breakfast, a soft-boiled egg. As he taps the shell with his spoon, a voice (in heavily accented English) says "Hey, who is it?" As the man continues to tap, it becomes clear the voice is coming from the egg. The man continues tapping away over the egg's protests, ultimately sadistically crushing the egg with his hands.

He has no sooner stopped than he hears a tapping from outside his home. He says, in a voice identical to that from the egg, "Hey, who is it?" He sees no one at the door, but the tapping continues, and the unseen force starts smashing the roof and walls, until the whole house implodes and crushes the man over his horrified objections.

== Production ==
Driessen worked on this and David after his first few films at National Film Board of Canada.

== Legacy ==
Nickelodeon aired the short film in between its regular programming throughout the 1990s.

This short film influenced Stephen Hillenburg to consider the field of animation.
