= Paul Driessen (animator) =

Dutch film director, animator and writer

- Born: Paul Augustin Driessen; 30 March 1940 (age 86); Nijmegen, Gelderland, Netherlands
- Occupations: Film director, writer, animator
- Years active: 1968–present

Paul Augustin Driessen (born 30 March 1940) is a Dutch film director, animator and writer.

== Biography ==
After studying graphic design and illustration at the Art Academy in Utrecht, Driessen began animating TV commercials in the Netherlands in the 1960s, although he had no training in that art at all. When George Dunning, in search for talent, found Driessen at the Cine Cartoon Centre in Hilversum, he hired him as an animator for his feature animation film Yellow Submarine (1968). He also helped Driessen to emigrate to Canada where he became a member of the National Film Board of Canada in 1972.

== Style ==
Driessen's style can be recognized by constantly moving lines and the fluid but awkward movements of his characters. His storytelling sometimes splits up the screen into three or even six different parts, with actions woven into each other.

== Accolades ==
His short films have won more than fifty prizes all over the world, including the Life Achievement Awards at both Ottawa and Zagreb animation festivals, and a 1999 Oscar nomination for 3 Misses.

== Legacy ==
In the 1980s Driessen taught animation at the University of Art Kassel, Germany, after Jan Lenica. Two of his students' films--Balance by Christoph and Wolfgang Lauenstein, and Quest by Tyron Montgomery and Thomas Stellmach—won Academy Awards. His films 3 Misses and 2D or Not 2D were included in the Animation Show of Shows.

His short film The Killing of an Egg influenced Stephen Hillenburg to consider the field of animation.

== Films ==
- "The Story of Little John Bailey" (1970)
- "Le Bleu perdu" (1972)
- "Air!" (1972)
- "Au bout du fil" ("Cat's Cradle") (1974)
- "An Old Box" ("Une vieille boîte") (1975)
- "David" (1977)
- "The Killing of an Egg" ("Ei om Zeep") (1977)
- "Ter land, ter zee en in de lucht" ("On Land, at Sea and in the Air") (1980)
- "Jeu de coudes" (Elbowing) (1980)
- "Het Treinhuisje" ("Home on the Rails") (1981)
- "Une histoire comme une autre" ("The Same Old Story") (1981)
- "La Belle et la boîte" ("Oh What a Knight") (1982)
- "Tip Top" (1984)
- "Het scheppen van een koe" ("Spotting a Cow") (1984)
- "Elephantrio" (1985)
- "Spiegel eiland" ("Sunny Side Up") (1985)
- "The Train Gang" (1986)
- "Getting There" (1986)
- "De Schrijver en de Dood" ("The Writer") (1988)
- "Uncles & Aunts #1" (1989)
- "The Water People" (1992)
- "Uncles & Aunts #3" (1992)
- "The End of the World in Four Seasons" ("La fin du monde en quatre saisons") (1995)
- "3 Misses" (1998)
- "The Boy Who Saw the Iceberg" ("Le garçon qui a vu l'iceberg") (2000)
- "2D or not 2D" (2003)
- "Oh What a Nico" (2004)
- "Oedipus" (2011)
- "Cat Meets Dog" (2015)
- "The One-Minute Memoir" (2020)
