= The Boy Who Saw the Iceberg =

- Directed by: Paul Driessen
- Written by: Paul Driessen
- Produced by: Marcy Page; David Verrall
- Music by: Normand Roger
- Color process: Technicolor
- Production company: National Film Board of Canada
- Release date: June 4, 2000
- Running time: 9 minutes
- Country: Canada

The Boy Who Saw the Iceberg (French: Le garçon qui a vu l'iceberg) is a 2000 animated short by Paul Driessen, which uses a split screen to portray the real life (on the left side) and imaginary life (on the right) of a young boy. A film without words, the 8 minute and 49 second National Film Board of Canada short is a retelling of the 1912 sinking of the Titanic through the eyes and active imagination of a young boy.

== Story ==
Over a period of three days, the film shows how the boy's fantasies of peril and adventure are frustrated by adults, who interrupt his fantasies, forcing the boy to start a new imaginary story line each time. Once aboard the ocean liner, however, the perils facing the boy are no longer the stuff of fancy. When he spots an iceberg and tries to warn the ship's captain, he is rebuffed. The film does not show the actual collision or disaster, going instead to white out. However, in an epilogue sequence, the film shows the final moments of the boy's consciousness: unable to warn anyone or make any heroic escape from this real peril, he returns to his bed, and his mind's view is extinguished. The film ends with the silent iceberg in both the left and right panels.

== Awards ==
The film received the Academy of Canadian Cinema and Television Award for Best Animated Short at the 22nd Genie Awards. International awards included a special international jury prize at the Hiroshima International Animation Festival, a special award "for the clarity of visual narration, the fluidity of animation and the quality of soundtrack" at Animafest Zagreb, the prize for best short film at the Seoul International Animation Festival, the Centaur Prize in the category of best animated film at Message to Man in Saint Petersburg, a FIPRESCI Award for the "innovative form of storytelling, involving the audience in a little boy's inner world" as well as a special jury prize at the Annecy International Animated Film Festival, a Silver Dragon in the animation category at the Kraków Film Festival, a Silver FIPA for short film at the Festival International de Programmes Audiovisuels, a Class B Award and award for best original soundtrack at the CINANIMA - Festival Internacional de Cinema de Animação, and a Silver Dove at the Leipzig International Film Festival.
