= List of animated short films of the 1990s =

Films are sorted by year and then alphabetically. They include theatrical, television, and direct-to-video films with less than 40 minutes runtime. For a list of films with over 40 minutes of runtime, see List of animated feature films of the 1990s.

== 1990 ==
Name	Country	Technique
Akuma-kun: Yōkoso Akuma Land e!!	Japan	Traditional Animation
Agnes Escapes from the Nursing Home	United States	Hand-drawn/hand-painted
Alexander and the Terrible, Horrible, No Good, Very Bad Day	United States	Traditional Animation
All My Relations	United States	Traditional/computer
The Arnold Waltz	United States	Stop-motion Animation
Big Bang	Italy	Traditional Animation
Big House Blues	United States	Traditional Animation
Bishoujo Animerama: Manami no Michi Tono Sou Nyuu!?	Japan	Traditional/Live-action
Cartoon All-Stars to the Rescue	United States	Traditional Animation
Chinpui: Eri-sama Katsudō Daishashin	Japan	Traditional Animation
Cinderella	United States	Traditional Animation
Computer Warriors: The Adventure Begins	United States	Computer/traditional
Danny and the Dinosaur	United States	Traditional Animation
Deadsy	United Kingdom	Stop-motion Animation
The Death of Stalinism in Bohemia	United Kingdom	Stop-motion Animation
Dig My Do	United States	Traditional Animation
Do the Bartman	United States	Traditional Animation
Earthday Birthday	United States	Traditional Animation
Eguchi Hisashi no Nantoka Narudesho!	Japan	Traditional/live-action
Fujiko Fujio A no Mumako	Japan	Traditional Animation
The Funtastic World of Hanna-Barbera	United States	Computer/traditional
Garfield's Feline Fantasies	United States	Traditional Animation
Going Equipped	United Kingdom	Stop-motion Animation
Grasshoppers	Italy	Traditional Animation
Grinning Evil Death	United States	Computer/traditional
Heisei no Cinderella: Kiko-sama Monogatari	Japan	Traditional Animation
Hollywood Dog	United States	Live-action/traditional
Ident	United Kingdom	Stop-motion Animation
Jack and the Beanstalk	United States	Traditional Animation
The Jackie Bison Show	United States	Traditional Animation
Jungle Book	United States	Traditional Animation
Kennosuke-sama	Japan	Traditional Animation
Kero Kero Keroppi no Daibōken: Fushigi na Mame no Ki	Japan	Traditional Animation
Klondike Christmas	Canada	Traditional Animation
Lightning Trap: Leina & Laika	Japan	Traditional Animation
The Little Match Girl	United States	Traditional Animation
Madeline's Christmas	United States, Canada, France	Traditional Animation
Mahōtsukai Sarī	Japan	Traditional Animation
The Marzipan Pig	United States	Traditional Animation
Mike Mulligan and His Steam Shovel	United States	Traditional Animation
Milky Passion: Dougenzaka - Ai no Shiro	Japan	Traditional Animation
More Bells and Whistles	United States	Computer Animation
Next	United Kingdom	Stop-motion Animation
Next Door	United States	Traditional Animation
Nicholas: The Boy Who Became Santa	United States	Traditional Animation
Noobow: Kieta Medal	Japan	Traditional Animation
Osomatsu-kun: Iyami wa Hitori Kaze no Naka	Japan	Traditional Animation
Pink: Water Bandit, Rain Bandit	Japan	Traditional Animation
Pokopon no Yukai na Saiyūki	Japan	Traditional Animation
Postman Pat's 123 Story	United Kingdom	Traditional Animation
Postman Pat's ABC Story	United Kingdom	Traditional Animation
The Prince and the Pauper	United States	Traditional Animation
The Real Story of Humpty Dumpty	Canada	Traditional Animation
The Real Story of the Three Little Kittens	Canada	Traditional Animation
The Red Shoes	United States	Traditional Animation
Rockin' Through the Decades	United States	Live-action/traditional
Roller Coaster Rabbit	United States	Live-action/traditional
Ryokunohara Labyrinth: Sparkling Phantom	Japan	Traditional Animation
Seryi Volk & Krasnaya Shapochka	Soviet Union	Stop-motion Animation
Snow White	United States	Traditional Animation
Soratobu Usagi no Yuukai Boushi: Boku Iya da yo!	Japan	Traditional Animation
Super Real Mahjong: Mahjong Battle Scramble	Japan	Traditional Animation
Super Real Mahjong: Miki Kasumi Shōko no Hajimemashite	Japan	Traditional Animation
Tango Schmango	United States	Traditional Animation
To Be	Canada	Traditional Animation
Transformers: Zone	Japan	Traditional Animation
Why, Charlie Brown, Why?	United States	Traditional Animation
Winston's Potty Chair	United States	Traditional Animation
World Womble Day	United Kingdom	Stop-motion Animation
The Yum Yums: The Day Things Went Sour	United States	Traditional Animation

== 1991 ==
Name	Country	Technique
Adachi-ga Hara	Japan	Traditional Animation
Aliens First Christmas	United States	Traditional Animation
Anamorphosis	United Kingdom	Stop-motion Animation
The Apprentice (L'Apprenti)	Canada	Traditional Animation
Arnold Rides His Chair	United States	Traditional Animation
Balloon	United Kingdom	Stop-motion Animation
Battletoads	United States	Traditional Animation
Blackfly	Canada	Traditional Animation
Box-Office Bunny	United States	Traditional Animation
By the Time the Moon Rises	Japan	Traditional animation
Claymation Comedy of Horrors	United States	Stop-motion Animation
The Comb	United Kingdom	Stop-motion Animation
Dancing	Italy	Traditional Animation
Deep, Deep Trouble	United States	Traditional Animation
Devil's Mine	France, Germany	Live-action/computer
Dorami-chan: Wow, the Kid Gang of Bandits!	Japan	Traditional Animation
Dreams	United Kingdom	Stop-motion Animation
Easter Egg Mornin'	United States	Limited
Every Dog's Guide to the Playground	Canada	Traditional Animation
Fast Food Matador	United States	Traditional Animation
Father Christmas	United Kingdom	Traditional Animation
Flossie & the Fox	United States	Traditional Animation
Frankie & Johnny	United States	Computer Animation
Fushigi na Elevator	Japan	Traditional Animation
Garfield Gets a Life	United States	Traditional Animation
The Green Beret	United States	Traditional Animation
Handsome na Kanojo	Japan	Traditional Animation
Hello Kitty no Mahō no Mori no Ohime-sama	Japan	Traditional Animation
The Honky Problem	United States	Traditional Animation
How Dinosaurs Became Extinct	United Kingdom	Stop-motion Animation
High Noon	United Kingdom	Cutout Animation
Huh?	United States	Traditional Animation
The Invisible Man in Blind Love	France	Computer Animation
The Last Halloween	United States	Computer/live-action
Light & Heavy	United States	Computer Animation
The Little Engine That Could	United States	Traditional Animation
The Lump	Canada	Cutout Animation
Madeline and the Bad Hat	United States, Canada, France	Traditional Animation
Madeline in London	United States, Canada, France	Traditional Animation
Madeline and the Gypsies	United States, Canada, France	Traditional Animation
Madeline's Rescue	United States, Canada, France	Traditional Animation
Manipulation	United Kingdom	Cutout/live-action/stop-motion/traditional
Murder!	United Kingdom	Cutout Animation
Nilus the Sandman: The Boy Who Dreamed Christmas	Canada	Live-action/traditional
No Neck Joe	United States	Traditional Animation
Push Comes to Shove	United States	Traditional Animation
The Sandman	United Kingdom	Stop-motion Animation
Santa and the Tooth Fairies	France, United Kingdom	Traditional animation
Sleeping Beauty	United States	Traditional Animation
Slide Show	United States	Computer Animation
Snoopy's Reunion	United States	Traditional Animation
Snowie and the Seven Dorps	United States	Traditional Animation
Snuffy, the Elf Who Saved Christmas	United States	Limited
Slim Pickin's	United Kingdom	Cutout Animation
Sōkō Kyoshin Z-Knight	Japan	Traditional Animation
The Soulmates: The Gift of Light	Canada	Traditional Animation
Strings	Canada	Paint-on-glass
Super Mario World: Mario & Yoshi's Adventure Land	Japan	Traditional Animation
Tamagawa Kyoudai	Japan	Traditional Animation
That's Nothin	United Kingdom	Traditional Animation
The Three Little Pigs	United States	Traditional Animation
Timmy's Gift: A Precious Moments Christmas	United States	Traditional Animation
Tooth Fairy, Where Are You?	Canada	Traditional Animation
Touch	United Kingdom	Traditional Animation
Two Sisters	Canada	Traditional Animation
UFO Nitsukamatta Kodomo-tachi	Japan	Traditional Animation
Uncle Elephant	United States	Stop-motion Animation
Winnie the Pooh and Christmas Too	United States	Traditional Animation
The Wiseman	United States	Traditional Animation
A Wish for Wings That Work	United States	Traditional Animation
The Wish That Changed Christmas	United States	Traditional Animation
The Wizard of Oz	United States	Traditional Animation
Words, Words, Words	Czechoslovakia	Traditional Animation

== 1992 ==
Name	Country	Technique
21 Emon: Soraike! Hadashi no Princess	Japan	Traditional animation
Adam	United Kingdom	Stop-motion animation
A Is for Autism	United Kingdom	Live-action/traditional
Andrei Svislotskiy	Russia	Traditional animation
The Birthday Dragon	Canada	Traditional animation
Candy Candy: The Movie	Japan	Traditional animation
Captain Weirdbeard and His Merry Swabs	United States	Traditional animation
Claymation Easter	United States	Stop-motion animation
Daumier's Law	United Kingdom	Traditional animation
Defenders of Dynatron City	United States	Traditional animation
Doraemon: In a Thrilling Solar Car	Japan	Traditional animation
Food	Czechoslovakia	Live-action/stop-motion
Frog Baseball	United States	Traditional animation
Gahan Wilson's Diner	United States	Traditional animation
Gas Planet	United States	Computer animation
Goldfish Warning!	Japan	Traditional animation
Happy Dog	United States	Computer animation
Inspector Gadget Saves Christmas	United States	Traditional animation
Invasion of the Bunny Snatchers	United States	Traditional animation
Itsy Bitsy Spider	United States	Traditional animation
Jankenman: Kaiju Daikessen	Japan	Traditional animation
Minoru: Memory of Exile	Canada	Traditional animation
Mona Lisa Descending a Staircase	United States	Hand-painted animation
The Moo Family Holiday Hoe-Down	United States	Traditional animation
Mouse Soup	United States	Stop-motion animation
Monster in My Pocket: The Big Scream	United States	Traditional animation
Mr. Men in the Great Alphabet Hunt	United Kingdom	Traditional animation
My Dog Zero	United States	Traditional animation
Never Say Pink Furry Die	United Kingdom	Stop-motion animation
Noël	United States	Traditional animation
Off His Rockers	United States	Computer/traditional
On Christmas Eve	United Kingdom	Traditional animation
Petal to the Metal	United States	Traditional animation
P. J. Sparkles	United States	Traditional animation
Psyched for Snuppa	United States	Traditional animation
Rainbow Across the Pacific	Japan	Traditional animation
The Real Story of Happy Birthday to You	Canada	Traditional animation
Rokudenashi Blues	Japan	Traditional animation
Santa's First Christmas	United States	Traditional animation
Scramble Wars: Tsuppashire! Genom Trophy Rally	Japan	Traditional animation
Soho Square	United Kingdom	Hand-painted animation
The Spirit of Christmas	United States	Stop-motion animation
The Super Trolls	United States	Traditional animation
The Tale of Nippoless Nippleby	United States	Traditional animation
The Teddy Bears' Christmas	Canada	Traditional animation
Tom Sweep	Canada	Traditional animation
Up on the Housetop	United States	Traditional animation
Ursa Minor Blue	Japan	Traditional animation
When Lilly Laney Moved In	United States	Traditional animation
Wormholes	United States	Traditional animation

== 1993 ==
Name	Country	Technique
Ahiru no Pekkle no Aladdin to Mahou no Lamp	Japan	Traditional animation
Ahiru no Pekkle no Hihou wo Sagase	Japan	Traditional animation
Ahiru no Pekkle no Sindbad no Bouken	Japan	Traditional animation
Ahiru no Pekkle no Suieitaikai wa Oosawagi	Japan	Traditional animation
Anata ga Furikaeru Toki	Japan	Traditional animation
Big Smoke	United States	Computer animation
Blindscape	United Kingdom	Traditional animation
Bob's Birthday	Canada, United Kingdom	Traditional animation
Britannia	United Kingdom	Traditional animation
Bubsy	United States	Traditional animation
Captain Pronin 2: Captain Pronin in America	Russia	Traditional animation
Captain Pronin 3: Captain Pronin in Space	Russia	Traditional animation
Christopher the Christmas Tree	United States	Traditional animation
Chuffyk	Russia	Traditional animation
Clinic	Ukraine	Traditional animation
Commander Toad in Space	United States	Stop-motion animation
A Communal Story	Russia	Traditional animation
A Cool Like That Christmas	United States	Traditional animation
The Country Mouse and the City Mouse: A Christmas Tale	United States	Traditional animation
Dorami-chan: Hello, Dynosis Kids!!	Japan	Traditional animation
Dr. Slump and Arale-chan: N-cha! Clear Skies Over Penguin Village	Japan	Traditional animation
Dr. Slump and Arale-chan: N-cha! From Penguin Village with Love	Japan	Traditional animation
Draw	United States	Traditional animation
A Flintstone Family Christmas	United States	Traditional animation
Ganbare Goemon: Jigen Jō no Akumu	Japan	Traditional animation
Girl from Phantasia	Japan	Traditional animation
The Gnomes and the Mountain King	Russia	Traditional animation
Grown Up	United States	Stop-motion/traditional
Hello Kitty no Yume Dorobō	Japan	Traditional animation
Hinamatsuri	Japan	Traditional animation
Hiroshima ni Ichiban Densha ga Hashitta	Japan	Traditional animation
I Pagliacci	United Kingdom	Stop-motion animation
Iddy Biddy Beat Boy	United States	Traditional animation
The Incredible Crash Dummies	Canada, United States	Traditional animation
Kamen Rider SD: Strange!? Kumo Otoko	Japan	Traditional animation
Kero Kero Keroppi no Gulliver no Bōken	Japan	Traditional animation
Kero Kero Keroppi no Kero Kero House no Himitsu	Japan	Traditional animation
Kero Kero Keroppi no Bouken: Pink no Kinoko	Japan	Traditional animation
Kero Kero Keroppi no Tomodachi wa Mahō Tsukai	Japan	Traditional animation
Kero Kero Keroppi no Yowamushi Ōji no Daibōken	Japan	Traditional animation
Kiki to Lala no Hakuchōza no Ohime-sama	Japan	Traditional animation
Kiki to Lala no Hansel to Gretel	Japan	Traditional animation
Kiki to Lala no Hoshi no Dance Shoes	Japan	Traditional animation
Kiki to Lala no Ohimesama ni Naritai	Japan	Traditional animation
Kogitsune no Okurimono	Japan	Traditional animation
The Legend of Lochnagar	United Kingdom	Traditional animation
The Louie N' Louie Show in: A Seedy Situation	United States	Traditional animation
Loves Me, Loves Me Not	United Kingdom	Stop-motion animation
The Man in the Air	Russia	Traditional animation
Mess O' Blues	United States	Traditional animation
The Mighty River	Canada	Paint-on-glass
Mii-chan no Tenohira	Japan	Traditional animation
Minky Momo in The Bridge Over Dreams	Japan	Traditional animation
Morris Has a Cold	United States	Stop-motion animation
Nanna & Lil' Puss Puss in 'One Ration Under God'	United States	Traditional animation
Nanna & Lil’ Puss Puss in ‘Who Calcutta the Cheese’	United States	Traditional animation
Nick & Noel	United States	Traditional animation
Not Without My Handbag	United Kingdom	Stop-motion animation
Oink	Canada	Traditional animation
Paddington's Alphabet Treasure Hunt	United Kingdom	Traditional animation
P.J.'s Unfunnybunny Christmas	United States	Traditional animation
Pochacco no Ninjin Hata wa Oosawagi	Japan	Traditional animation
Pochacco no Wakuwaku Birthday	Japan	Traditional animation
Prince Cinders	United Kingdom	Traditional animation
Pro and Con	United States	Stop-motion/traditional
Psyched for Snuppa	United States	Traditional animation
Recycle Rex	United States	Traditional animation
Richard Scarry's Best Busy People Video Ever!	United States	Traditional animation
Richard Scarry's Best Learning Songs Video Ever!	United States	Traditional animation
Shut Balakirev	Russia	Traditional animation
Small Talk	United Kingdom	Traditional animation
Sylvester and the Magic Pebble	United States	Traditional animation
Time of Love	United States	Computer animation
Timmy's Special Delivery: A Precious Moments Christmas	United States	Traditional animation
The Town Santa Forgot	United States	Traditional animation
Trail Mix-Up	United States	Live-action/traditional
Tsuru ni Notte - Tomoko no Bōken	Japan	Traditional animation
Tsuyoshi Shikkari Shinasai: Tsuyoshi no Time Machine de Shikkari Shinasai	Japan	Traditional animation
The Twelve Days of Christmas	United States	Traditional animation
Vaniusha and The Giant	Russia	Stop-motion animation
The Village	United Kingdom	Traditional animation
"Weird Al" Yankovic: Jurassic Park	United States	Stop-motion animation
The Wrong Trousers	United Kingdom	Stop-motion animation
Yu Yu Hakusho: The Movie	Japan	Traditional animation

== 1994 ==
Name	Country	Technique
Angry Cabaret	United States	Traditional Animation
B.B. Fish	Japan	Traditional Animation
The Bears Who Saved Christmas	United States	Traditional Animation
The Big Story	United States	Stop-motion Animation
Chariots of Fur	United States	Traditional Animation
Deck the Halls	United States	Traditional Animation
The Dirdy Birdy	United States	Traditional Animation
Dorami-chan: A Blue Straw Hat	Japan	Traditional Animation
Dr. Slump and Arale-chan: Hoyoyo!! Follow the Rescued Shark...	Japan	Traditional Animation
Dr. Slump and Arale-chan: N-cha!! Excited Heart of Summer Vacation	Japan	Traditional Animation
Drop	Italy	Traditional Animation
Edith Ann: A Few Pieces of the Puzzle	United States	Traditional Animation
Edith Ann: Homeless Go Home	United States	Traditional Animation
El héroe	Mexico	Traditional Animation
Fish in the Trap	Japan	Traditional Animation
Gagarin	Russia	Traditional Animation
Heisei Inu Monogatari Bow: Genshi Inu Monogatari Bow	Japan	Traditional Animation
A Hollywood Hounds Christmas	United States	Traditional Animation
I'm Mad	United States	Traditional Animation
The Janitor	Canada	Traditional Animation
Jolly Old St. Nicholas	United States	Traditional Animation
Lumpkin the Pumpkin	United States	Limited
The Magic Flute	United States	Traditional Animation
Minky Momo in The Station of Your Memories	Japan	Traditional animation
Mole's Christmas	United Kingdom	Traditional Animation
The Monk and the Fish	France	Traditional Animation
Nilus the Sandman: Monsters in the Closet	Canada	Live-action/traditional
Ninku: Tomb of Knives	Japan	Traditional Animation
O Christmas Tree	United States	Traditional Animation
Read Along with Postman Pat	United Kingdom	Traditional Animation
The Red Book	United States	Cutout Animation
Robert Creep: A Dog's Life	France	Traditional animation
Sgt. Savage and his Screaming Eagles: Old Soldiers Never Die	United States	Traditional Animation
Slam Dunk	Japan	Traditional Animation
Sleepy Guy	United States	Computer Animation
Smart Talk with Raisin	United States	Traditional Animation
Snow White and the Magic Mirror	United States	Traditional Animation
Stressed	United Kingdom	Traditional Animation
Triangle	United Kingdom	Traditional Animation
TwinBee: WinBee's 1/8 Panic	Japan	Traditional Animation
Umeboshi Denka: Uchū no Hate kara Panparopan!	Japan	Traditional Animation
We Wish You a Merry Christmas	United States	Traditional Animation
Whoopass Stew	United States	Traditional Animation
Yukiwatari	Japan	Traditional Animation

== 1995 ==
Name	Country	Technique
2112: The Birth of Doraemon	Japan	Traditional Animation
Abductees	United Kingdom	Traditional Animation
Achilles	United Kingdom	Stop-motion Animation
Ah, L'Amour	United States	Traditional Animation
Another Froggy Evening	United States	Traditional Animation
The Ballad of Archie Foley	United States	Traditional Animation
Brick-a-Brac	United States	Computer Animation
The Chicken from Outer Space	United States	Traditional Animation
A Close Shave	United Kingdom	Stop-motion Animation
Carrotblanca	United States	Traditional Animation
Daisy-Head Mayzie	United States	Traditional Animation
Dino: Stay Out!	United States	Traditional Animation
Driving Mr. Pink	United States	Traditional Animation
The End of the World in Four Seasons	Canada	Traditional Animation
The End	Canada	Computer Animation
Gogs Ogof	United Kingdom	Stop-motion Animation
Hard Luck Duck	United States	Traditional Animation
Help?	United States	Traditional Animation
Jingle Bell Rock	United States	Traditional Animation
Kebabaluba	Turkey	Traditional Animation
Le Père Noël et son jumeau	France	Traditional Animation
The Life of Larry	United States	Limited
Makeruna! Makendo	Japan	Traditional Animation
Nilus the Sandman: The First Day	Canada	Live-action/traditional
Ninku: The Movie	Japan	Traditional Animation
On Your Mark	Japan	Traditional Animation
Oni no Ko to Yuki Usagi	Japan	Traditional Animation
Pib and Pog	United Kingdom	Stop-motion Animation
Red Boots for Christmas	United States	Traditional Animation
Runaway Brain	United States	Traditional Animation
Santa & the Magician	France	Traditional Animation
Santa's Christmas Crash	France	Traditional Animation
Scratch and Crow	United States	Hand-Painted Animation
Slam Dunk: Howling Basketman Spirit!!	Japan	Traditional Animation
Slam Dunk: Shohoku's Greatest Challenge!	Japan	Traditional Animation
Space Usagi	United States	Traditional Animation
The Spirit of Christmas	United States	Stop-motion Animation
Stand by Me	United States	Traditional Animation
Street Fighter II: Return to Fujiwara Capital	Japan	Traditional Animation
The Tickler Talks	United Kingdom	Traditional Animation
Tulip Beach Stories	Japan	Traditional Animation
Young Pocahontas	United States	Traditional Animation

== 1996 ==
Name	Country	Technique
Alice in Cyberland	Japan	Traditional Animation
Beat the Meatles	United States	Traditional Animation
Billy and Mandy in Trepanation of the Skull and You	United States	Traditional Animation
Black Jack: Capital Transfer to Heian	Japan	Traditional Animation
Boo to You Too! Winnie the Pooh	United States	Traditional Animation
Bow-Wow Buccaneers	United States	Traditional Animation
Diary of a Camper	United States	Computer Animation
Dinner for Two	Canada	Traditional Animation
Dorami & Doraemons: Robot School's Seven Mysteries	Japan	Traditional Animation
Edith Ann's Christmas (Just Say Noël)	United States	Traditional Animation
Famous Fred	United Kingdom	Traditional Animation
Happy Birthday Bunnykins	Canada	Traditional Animation
Hey Arnold!	United States	Traditional Animation
Honto ni Atta Gakkou Kaidan	Japan	Traditional Animation
How Wings Are Attached to the Backs of Angels	Canada	Cutout Animation
The Ignoramooses	United States	Traditional Animation
Killer Bean: The Interrogation	United States	Computer Animation
The Kitchen Casanova	United States	Traditional Animation
Magical Circle Guru Guru	Japan	Traditional Animation
No Neck Joe Goes to Africa	United States	Traditional Animation
No Tip	United States	Traditional Animation
North by North Pole	United Kingdom	Stop-motion Animation
The Orchard	New Zealand	Traditional Animation
Panzer Dragoon	Japan	Traditional Animation
Pop	United Kingdom	Stop-motion Animation
Quest	Germany	Stop-motion Animation
Mermaid	Russia	Paint-on-glass
The Saint Inspector	United Kingdom	Stop-motion Animation
La Salla	Canada	Computer Animation
Superior Duck	United States	Traditional Animation
Testament - The Bible In Animation: Joseph	United Kingdom	Stop-motion Animation
Testament - The Bible In Animation: Moses	United Kingdom	Traditional Animation
That Strange Person	United States	Hand-drawn/hand-painted
Toire no Hanako-san	Japan	Traditional Animation
Trainspotter	United Kingdom	Traditional Animation
School Daze	United States	Traditional Animation
Uncle	Australia	Stop-motion Animation
Violinist of Hameln	Japan	Traditional Animation
Wat's Pig	United Kingdom	Stop-motion Animation
Welcome to the Discworld	United Kingdom	Traditional Animation

== 1997 ==
Name	Country	Technique
The Amazing Feats of Young Hercules	United States	Traditional Animation
Awfully Lucky	United States	Traditional Animation
Babe, He Calls Me	United States	Traditional Animation
Baby Love	Japan	Traditional Animation
Blahbalicious	United States	Computer Animation
(Blooper) Bunny	United States	Traditional Animation
The Broken Jaw	United Kingdom	Traditional Animation
Cutie Honey Flash: The Movie	Japan	Traditional Animation
Dino: The Great Egg-Scape	United States	Traditional Animation
The Doraemons: The Puzzling Challenge Letter of the Mysterious Thief Dorapan	Japan	Traditional Animation
El Caminante	United Kingdom	Traditional Animation
Father Christmas and the Missing Reindeer	United Kingdom	Traditional Animation
Father of the Bird	United States	Traditional Animation
Flatworld	United Kingdom	Cutout Animation
From Hare to Eternity	United States	Traditional Animation
Gabola the Great	United States	Computer Animation
Geri's Game	United States	Computer Animation
Hana yori Dango: The Movie	Japan	Traditional Animation
Harry the Dirty Dog	United States	Traditional Animation
KnitWits	United States	Traditional Animation
Larry & Steve	United States	Traditional Animation
Malcom and Melvin	United States	Traditional Animation
Noiseman Sound Insect	Japan	Traditional Animation
Noodles and Nedd	United States	Traditional Animation
Officer Buckle and Gloria	United States	Traditional Animation
The Old Lady and the Pigeons	Belgium, Canada, France, United Kingdom	Traditional Animation
Owzat	United Kingdom	Computer Animation
Pingu at the Wedding Party	Switzerland	Stop-motion Animation
The Puzzling Challenge Letter of the Mysterious Thief Dorapan	Japan	Traditional Animation
Pullet Surprise	United States	Traditional Animation
Redux Riding Hood	United States	Traditional Animation
Santa vs. the Snowman	United States	Computer Animation
Space War	United States	Traditional Animation
Stage Fright	United Kingdom	Stop-motion Animation
Strange Things	United States	Computer Animation
T.R.A.N.S.I.T.	Netherlands, United Kingdom	Traditional Animation
When Life Departs	Estonia	Traditional Animation

== 1998 ==
Name	Country	Technique
3 Misses	Netherlands	Traditional animation
1001 Nights	United States	Traditional animation
Al Dente	United Kingdom	Computer animation
Animated Epics: Beowulf	Russia, United Kingdom, United States	Traditional animation
Basic Insect	United States	Computer animation
The Bear	United Kingdom	Traditional animation
Billy's Balloon	United States	Traditional animation
Bingo	Canada	Computer animation
Bokutachi no Peace River	Japan	Traditional animation
Bunny	United States	Computer animation
The Canterbury Tales	United Kingdom	Stop-motion in the main sequences and various styles in the story sequences
Charlie's Christmas	France	Traditional animation
Cousin	Australia	Stop-motion animation
Do the Evolution	United States	Traditional animation
Doraemon Comes Back	Japan	Traditional animation
The Doraemons: The Great Operating of Springing Insects!	Japan	Traditional animation
Dorbees: Making Decisions	United States	Computer animation
The Eye of the Wolf	France	Traditional animation
Fetch	United States	Traditional animation
The First Snow of Winter	United Kingdom, United States	Traditional animation
Ganbare Goemon: Chikyū Kyūshutsu Sakusen	Japan	Traditional animation
Gauche the Cellist	Japan	Traditional animation
Gekiganger 3: Nekketsu Daikessen!!	Japan	Traditional animation
Glassy Ocean	Japan	Traditional animation
Gogwana	United Kingdom	Stop-motion animation
Good Night, Gorilla	United States	Traditional animation
Gun Bare! Game Tengoku: The Game Paradise 2	Japan	Traditional animation
Hector the Get-Over Cat	United States	Traditional animation
Humdrum	United Kingdom	Stop-motion animation
Hunter × Hunter – Jump Super Anime Tour 98	Japan	Traditional animation
Jimmy Neutron, Boy Genius: Runaway Rocketboy!	United States	Computer animation
Jolly Roger	United Kingdom	Traditional animation
Kenny and the Chimp in Diseasy Does It! or Chimp 'n' Pox	United States	Traditional animation
Kono Hoshi no Ue ni	Japan	Traditional animation
Kuzuryuugawa to Shounen	Japan	Traditional animation
Millennium Bug	United States	Computer animation
More	United States	Stop-motion animation
Nanna & Lil' Puss Puss in 'Common Cents'	United States	Computer animation
Night on Bald Mountain	Russia	Traditional animation
One Piece: Defeat Him! The Pirate Ganzack!	Japan	Traditional animation
Pikachu's Vacation	Japan	Traditional animation
Roxanne's Best Christmas Ever	United States	Traditional animation
Seikimatsu Leader Gaiden Takeshi!	Japan	Traditional animation
Slime Boukenki: Wolf-kun Ganbaru no Maki	Japan	Traditional animation
Snowden: Raggedy Ann & Andy's Adventure	Canada, United States	Traditional animation
The Teddy Bears' Scare	Canada	Traditional animation
A Weekend with Wendell	United States	Traditional animation
Yellow Fish	Japan	Experimental animation
A Winnie the Pooh Thanksgiving	United States	Traditional animation
Zoomates	United States	Traditional animation

== 1999 ==
Name	Country	Technique
Al Tudi Tuhak	Canada	Traditional Animation
Brother	Australia	Stop-motion Animation
Arisa☆Good Luck	Japan	Traditional Animation
Chicka Chicka Boom Boom	United States	Traditional Animation
Chiisana Kyōjin Microman: Daigekisen! Microman vs. Saikyou Senshi Gorgon	Japan	Traditional Animation
Chrysanthemum	United States	Traditional Animation
Cuckoo, Mr. Edgar!	Canada	Computer Animation
Digimon Adventure	Japan	Traditional Animation
Doraemon: Nobita's the Night Before a Wedding	Japan	Traditional Animation
The Doraemons: Funny Candy of Okashinana!?	Japan	Traditional Animation
The Exciting Life of a Tree	United States	Traditional Animation
Eugenio	France	Traditional Animation
Europe & Italy	Italy	Flash Animation
Fat Cat on a Diet	United States	Computer Animation
Fishing	United States	Computer Animation
Foe Paws	United States	Traditional Animation
Hooves of Fire	United Kingdom	Stop-motion Animation
Hyakumannen Attara, Dousuru?	Japan	Traditional Animation
Infection	New Zealand	Live-action/computer
Knitwits Revisited	United States	Traditional Animation
The Man with the Beautiful Eyes	United Kingdom	Traditional Animation
Minotaur and Little Nerkin	United Kingdom	Computer Animation
Mon copain?	France	Stop-motion Animation
My Grandmother Ironed the King's Shirts	Canada	Traditional Animation
The Old Man and the Sea	Canada, Japan, Russia	Paint-on-glass
Periwig Maker	Germany	Stop-motion Animation
The Phox, the Box, & the Lox	United States	Traditional Animation
Pikachu's Rescue Adventure	Japan	Traditional Animation
Princess Knight	Japan	Traditional Animation
Run of the Mill	Denmark, Netherlands	Traditional Animation
Santa's Last Christmas	United Kingdom	Traditional Animation
Santa Special Delivery	United Kingdom, France	Traditional Animation
School Disco	United Kingdom	Traditional Animation
She and Her Cat	Japan	Traditional Animation
Surprise Cinema	United States	Traditional Animation
Thrillseeker: Putt 'n' Perish	United States	Traditional Animation
Time Ranger Cesar Boy no Bouken: Roma Teikoku-hen	Japan	Traditional Animation
A Valentine for You	United States	Traditional Animation
Village of Idiots	Canada	Traditional Animation
When the Day Breaks	Canada	Traditional Animation
Yu-Gi-Oh!	Japan	Traditional Animation
