= Panic Attack! =

Animated short by Eileen O'Meara

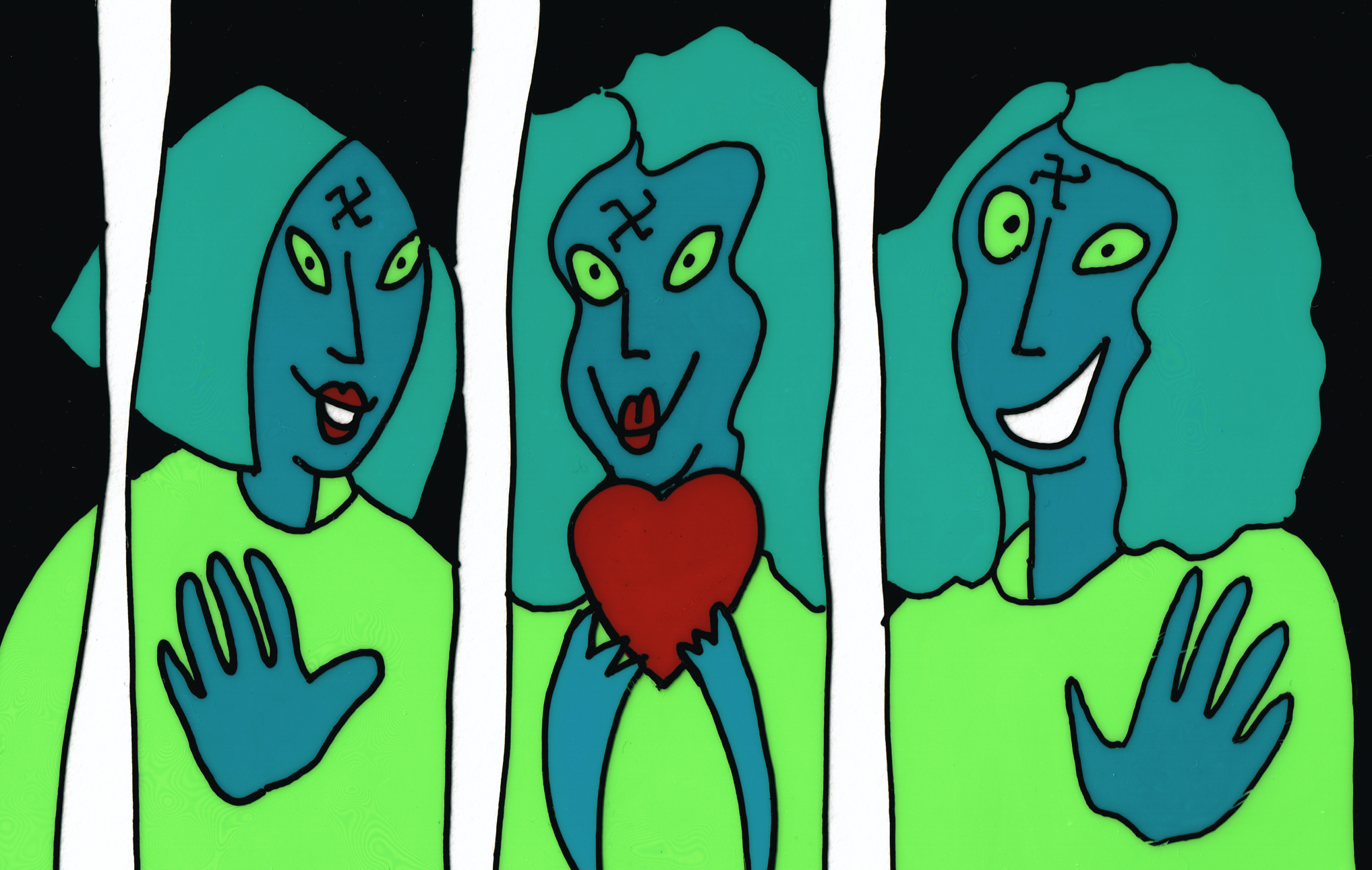
"The Manson Girls!" still from "Panic Attack!" by Eileen O'Meara, used with permission

Panic Attack! is a hand-drawn, hand-painted animated short by Eileen O'Meara. It was jury-selected for Aspen Shortsfest, Palm Springs ShortFest, Florida Film Festival, Anim'est and Raindance Film Festival.

== Awards ==
- First Prize, Short Film, Bilderbeben, Filmhaus Bielefeld, Germany
- First Prize, Animation, Benedictine Film Festival
- First Prize, Animation, Huntington Beach Film Festival
- First Prize, Animation, Queens World Film Festival
- First Place, Animated/Experimental/Alternative Media, KinoDrome International Motion Picture Festival
- Best Animation, Cinema Perpetuum Mobile International Film Festival, Minsk, Belarus
- Jury Prize for Animation, Jaipur International Film Festival
- Popular Jury Award, Lobo Fest, Brazil
- Best Experimental Short, Brooklyn Women's Film Festival
- Best Short Film, PUSH! Film Festival
- Best Animated Short, 6 on Nebraska, Cape Town, South Africa
- Best International Short Film, Kinomorphia Film Festival, Sofia, Bulgaria
- Best International 2D Short, Carton International Animation Festival La Tribu, Buenos Aires
- Francie Award, Animation, Clones Film Festival
- Spirit Award, Animation, Brooklyn Film Festival
- Best Animation Film, Splice Film Fest
- Platinum Remi Award, Cel Animation, WorldFest-Houston International Film Festival
- Professional Animation Award, St. Francis College Women's Film Festival
- Audience Choice Award for Animation, Splice Film Fest
- Jury Award for Short Film under 3 minutes Preview Film Festival, Barcelona
- Solé Tura Award, Brain Film Festival
- Jury Mention for Best International Film, Beirut International Women Film Festival
- Best Genre-Bender, Sunrise 45 Film Festival
- Golden Sausage, Orscheler FilmFest
- Honorable Mention, James River Short film Festival
- Honorable Mention, Muestra Intergalactica, Saltillo, Mexico
- Special Mention, Animation, Pentedattilo Film Festival
- Special Mention, Orvieto Cinema Fest, Orvieto, Umbria, Italy
- Special Mention, Saint Petersburg International Film Festival, Russian Federation
- Special Mention, London-Worldwide Comedy Short Film Festival
- Special Mention, UK Seasonal Short Film Festival
- Cortos Ganadores, Special Mention, Festicine Pehuajo

== See also ==
- That Strange Person
- Agnes Escapes from the Nursing Home
