= Ginga no Uo Ursa Minor Blue =

1993 Japanese animated short film by Shigeru Tamura

- Directed by: Shigeru Tamura
- Written by: Shigeru Tamura
- Produced by: Tomiyo Hiruta; Mitsuo Shionaga; Kaoru Matsuzaki
- Starring: Ichirō Nagai; Shōhei Ayukawa; Isamu Tanonaka
- Music by: Teshikai Utollo
- Production company: Ai ga areba Daijobu Co.
- Release date: 1993
- Running time: 23 minutes
- Country: Japan
- Language: Japanese

Ginga no Uo Ursa Minor Blue (Japanese: 銀河の魚 URSA minor BLUE; also romanized Ginga no Sakana and translated as Blue Little Bear Ursa Minor Blue or Fish of the Milky Way Ursa Minor Blue) is a 1993 Japanese animated science fiction short film written and directed by illustrator Shigeru Tamura, with music by Teshikai Utollo. The 23-minute film is an early work of digital animation and was produced using Macintosh Quadra computers and high-definition video.

The film follows a boy named Yuri and his astronomer grandfather on a surreal journey along the Milky Way, where they encounter a monstrous fish attacking the constellations. Its imagery combines science fiction, fantasy and surrealism; The Encyclopedia of Science Fiction has characterized it as an example of absurdist science fiction.

The film received the Ōfuji Noburō Award at the 1993 Mainichi Film Awards, as well as several other awards and distinctions at international and Japanese electronic-media and high-definition film festivals.

Tamura later adapted the film into a picture book, while an interactive CD-ROM adaptation was published by Sony Music Entertainment Japan in 1994.

== Plot ==
An elderly astronomer and his grandson Yuri live at an observatory on an island. One night, while observing the sky, they discover that Ursa Minor has acquired an additional star. The following morning, the pair travel downriver by boat toward the sea. During their journey downstream they encounter a series of surreal phenomena, as the familiar landscape increasingly gives way to fantastical sights, with animate trees and airborne ape-like creatures appearing along the way. They eventually encounter a mobile building and learn that stars have been disappearing from the Milky Way.

When they reach the ocean, Yuri notices what appears to be a suburban landscape beneath its surface, itself containing a coastline and sea. They discover that their boat is actually travelling along the Milky Way, represented as a river of stars. Ursa Minor has transformed into a monstrous fish that is attacking and consuming the other constellations. A harpoon made from fragments of stars is forged for Yuri. Continuing their journey, Yuri and his grandfather encounter a damaged giant robot that serves as a lighthouse. The robot tells them that the fish has travelled toward the spiral galaxy. They pursue the creature, and Yuri strikes it with the harpoon. The sky becomes suffused with golden light, while their boat is caught in the galaxy's whirlpool, which carries Yuri and his grandfather back home.

== Production ==
Ginga no Uo Ursa Minor Blue was written and directed by Japanese illustrator and animator Shigeru Tamura. The film was produced by Tomiyo Hiruta, Mitsuo Shionaga and Kaoru Matsuzaki. Its production received support from Sony Corporation, Sony Music Entertainment Japan and Ai Ga Areba Daijobu Co. Ltd., with Apple Computer Japan and NAC Corporation credited as contributors. The digital production used Macintosh Quadra 700 and 900 computers and software including Hypergraphy, Macromedia Director, Studio 8 and SuperPaint.

The voice cast includes Shōhei Ayukawa as Yuri, Ichirō Nagai as Yuri's grandfather, Shinichi Tsuda as the robot lighthouse, and Isamu Tanonaka.

Tamura subsequently directed the animated works A Piece of Phantasmagoria (1995) and Glassy Ocean (1998), which similarly employ surreal and fantastical imagery.

== Other media ==
The film was based on Tamura's earlier manga Ginga no Uo, which had originally appeared in Manga Shōnen in 1980. The film's bibliographic record identifies the collection Small Planet, published by Seirindō in 1985, as its source work. Tamura later adapted the film into a 63-page children's picture book, Ginga no Uo, published by Libroport in November 1993. The book uses newly written text and illustrations based on the animated film; it was republished by Media Factory in 1998.

An interactive CD-ROM adaptation of the film was also published by Sony Music Entertainment Japan in 1994 for Macintosh and Windows 3.1. Developed by Ai ga areba Daijobu Ltd. (愛があれば大丈夫（株）愛があれば大丈夫」), it follows the film's story as an interactive storybook, allowing users to interact with elements of individual scenes and move between them.

A soundtrack album composed by Teshikai Utollo, titled Ginga no Uo Ursa Minor Blue, was released on CD; a 16-track edition was reissued by SPE Visual Works in November 1998.

== Reception ==
=== Awards ===
The film received several awards and distinctions, including the Ōfuji Noburō Award at the 1993 Mainichi Film Awards, the Grand Prix at the 6th International Electronic Cinema Festival, the Selection Committee Chairman's Prize at the Hi-Vision Awards, and an award at the Images du Futur festival.

=== Reviews and analysis ===
The Encyclopedia of Science Fiction described Blue Little Bear Ursa Minor Blue as a gently surreal and inventive example of absurdist science fiction, praising its simple but engaging animation and calling the film charming, although somewhat slowly paced. It also noted the film's imaginative imagery, including talking trees, flying primates, a walking tower block and a giant robot lighthouse, within a story in which the Milky Way is literally represented as a river of stars.

Ginga no Uo received attention for both its visual style and its use of digital animation. The Iwate Museum of Art described the film as particularly notable for its "digital expression and beautiful colors". Animation scholar Catherine Munroe Hotes similarly identified color as an important element of Tamura's style, noting the predominance of blue in the film and its contrasting use of green and orange. She compared Tamura's use of large areas of saturated color with the work of later Japanese independent animators Kunio Katō and Tomoyoshi Joko.

A 1993 Sony HD Videodisc catalogue described the film as the first production to use Macintosh computers together with high-definition video to create full-animation computer graphics. A four-minute excerpt was subsequently presented at SIGGRAPH 1994.
