= Clones, County Monaghan =

Town in County Monaghan, Ireland

Clones Cluain Eois (Irish)
- Town
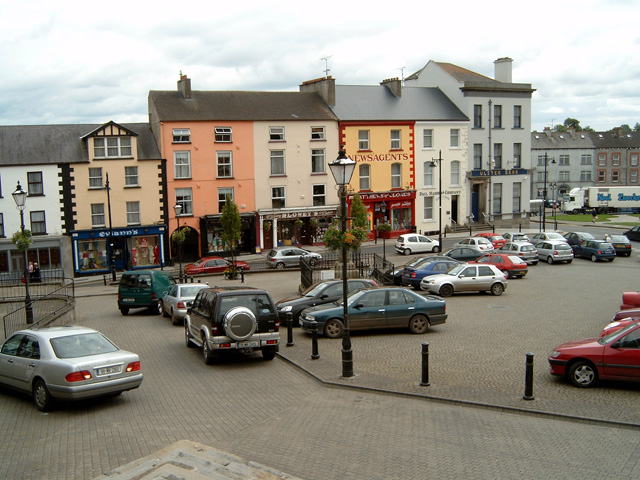

- Location in Ireland
- Coordinates: 54.183°N 7.2337°W
- Country: Ireland
- Province: Ulster
- County: County Monaghan
- Barony: Dartree
- Elevation: 71 m (233 ft)

Population (2022)
  - Total: 1,885
- Eircode routing key: H23
- Telephone area code: +353(0)47
- Irish Grid Reference: H500257
- Website: clones.ie

Historical population
Year	Pop.	±%
1821	2,240	—
1831	2,381	+6.3%
1841	2,877	+20.8%
1851	2,319	−19.4%
1861	2,390	+3.1%
1871	2,170	−9.2%
1881	2,216	+2.1%
1891	2,032	−8.3%
1901	2,068	+1.8%
1911	2,401	+16.1%
1926	2,365	−1.5%
1936	2,235	−5.5%
1946	2,092	−6.4%
1951	2,455	+17.4%
1956	2,399	−2.3%
1961	2,107	−12.2%
1966	2,038	−3.3%
1971	2,164	+6.2%
1981	2,556	+18.1%
1986	2,542	−0.5%
1991	2,347	−7.7%
1996	2,170	−7.5%
2002	1,947	−10.3%
2006	1,767	−9.2%
2011	1,761	−0.3%
2016	1,680	−4.6%
2022	1,885	+12.2%

Clones (/ˈkloʊnɪs/ KLOH-nis; from Irish Cluain Eois, meaning 'meadow of Eois') is a small town in the west of County Monaghan in Ireland. The area is part of the Border Region in the Republic of Ireland, earmarked for economic development by the Irish Government due to its currently below-average economic situation. The town was badly hit economically by the Partition of Ireland in 1921 because of its location on the border with County Fermanagh in Northern Ireland. The creation of the Irish border deprived it of access to a large part of its economic hinterland for many years. The town had a population of 1,885 at the 2022 census. The town is in a civil parish of the same name.

== Toponymy ==
Historically Clones was also spelt Clonis, Clonish and Clownish. These are anglicised versions of the Irish Cluain Eois, meaning "Eos's meadow". The ancient name was Cluan Innis, "island of retreat", it having formerly been nearly surrounded by water.

== History ==
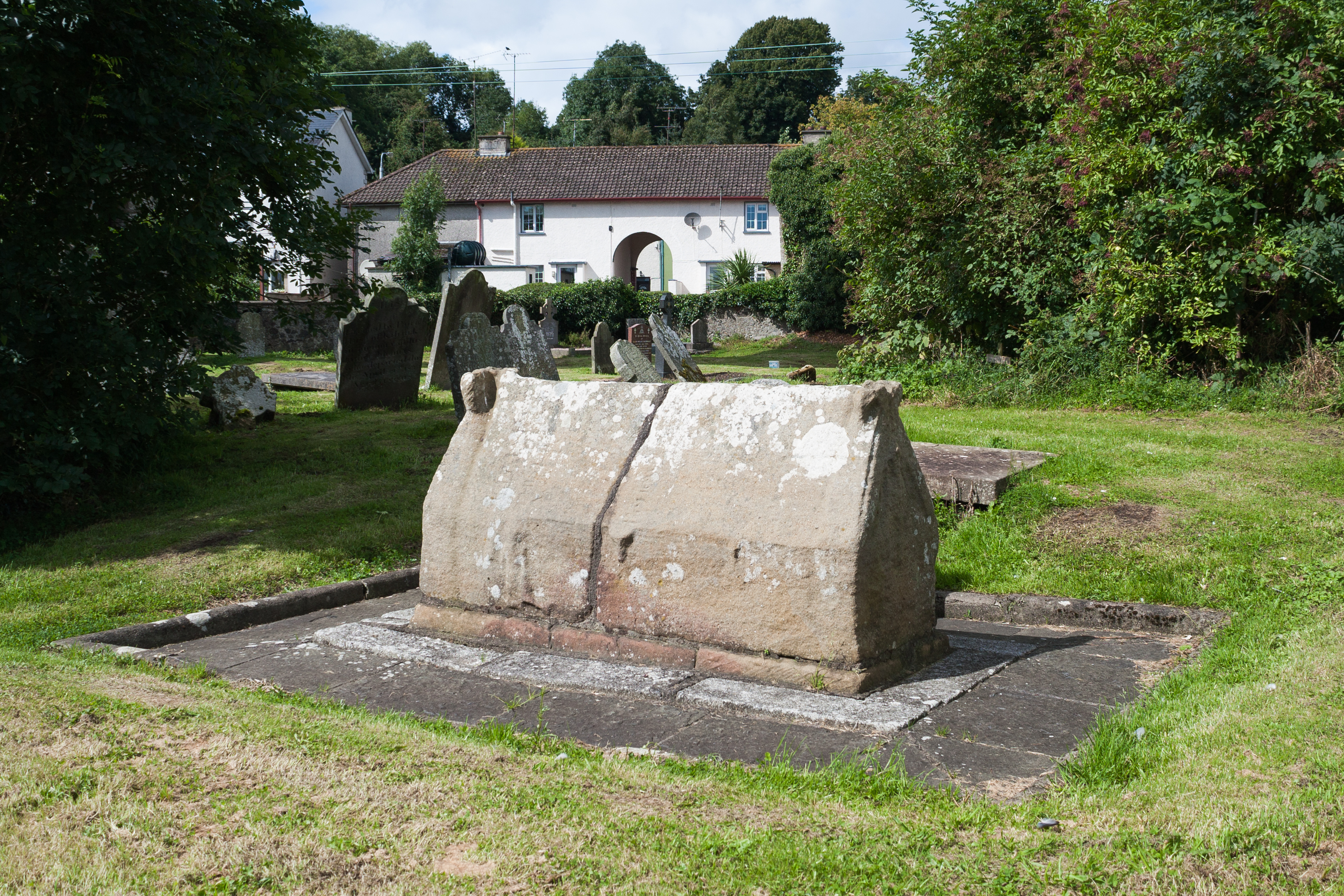
St. Tighearnach's Shrine in the form of a wooden church

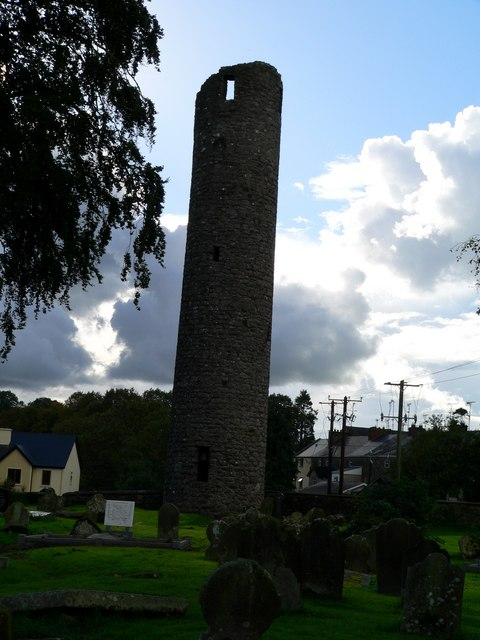
Clones Round Tower

=== Early Christian Ireland ===
The monastery of Clones was established in the 6th century by St. Tighernach. Tighernach was of the family Uí Cremthainn: one of the many families that made up the kingdom of Airgialla in South Ulster. St. Tighernach had received the benediction of St. Maccartin, granted the bishopric of Clogher and performed many miracles across Ireland, Britain and France. It is said under the direction of an Angel, he erected Clones Monastery in the territory of his grandfather. The monastery of Clones would expand quickly, and Tighernach was consecrated as the first bishop of Clones while retaining his Clogher bishopric, being referred to as "Ferdachrioch", (man of two districts). The cult of Tighernach, which grew from his legend, was propagated a branch of the Uí Cremthainn who migrated to the Clones area in the 8th century. St. Tighernach became the most popular saint in the Clogher diocese. The Clones abbey of SS Peter and Paul promoted Tighernach outside of the diocese that his cult extended across the British Isles. The succeeding abbots of Clones would be titled "coarb" (successors to the founder of the monastery) and received special privileges in the Clones parish.

=== Norman Ireland ===
During the 12th century, ecclesiastical reform sought to curtail the perceived clerical abuses of the Irish. Like the Clones coarbship, church offices had become hereditary within powerful Gaelic families. As part of the reformation, the Canons Regular of St Augustine established themselves in Clones and set up a monastery. They owned property in Lisdrum, Maguiresbridge and Granshagh. Nevertheless, the Clones coarbship continued to be inherited within families like the McMahons up until the confiscation of Clones parish in the 16th century.

The Norman invasions of the late 13th century saw Clones monastery razed by Hugh de Lacy. In 1211, a motte and bailey were constructed by Normans overlooking Clones but the occupation did not last.

=== Early Modern Ireland ===
Having been confiscated by the English Crown during the Plantations of Ireland, the entire church estate was subsequently leased to Elizabethan explorer Sir Henry Duke in 1587. It was later inherited in 1640 by his descendant, Anne Loftus, granddaughter of Thomas, 1st Viscount Loftus. By 1641, the estate was in the ownership of her husband, who was Richard Lennard-Barrett, owner of the Belhus Estate in Essex. During the Irish Rebellion of 1641, Clones was the site of conflicts between native Gaelic gentry and newly settled planters from Great Britain. The Depositions state that Irish rebels, led by MacMahons of Oriel (Monaghan) hoping to restore their ancestral lands, looted and burned properties now occupied by planters; targeting rich farmers and their tenants. At least thirty-four planters and dozens of Irish rebels were killed over the course of the war.

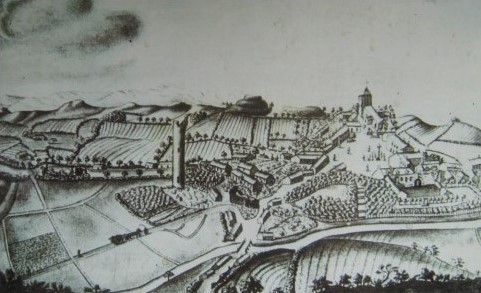
View of Clones in 1741

=== Free State and Republic ===
On 11 February 1922, during the partition of Ireland, there was an armed confrontation in Clones between the Irish Republican Army (IRA) and the Ulster Special Constabulary (USC). A unit of armed Special Constables stopped off at Clones railway station while travelling by train from Belfast to Enniskillen (both in Northern Ireland). The Provisional Government of Southern Ireland was unaware any British forces would be crossing through its territory. IRA volunteers called on the USC men to surrender for questioning, but one of them shot dead an IRA sergeant. This sparked a firefight in which four Special Constables were killed and several wounded. Five others were captured. The incident, known as the "Clones Affray", threatened to spark off a major confrontation between North and South, and the British government temporarily suspended the withdrawal of British troops from the South. A Border Commission was set up to mediate in any future border disputes, but achieved very little.

During The Troubles, on 28 December 1972, a car bomb exploded on Fermanagh Street in Clones, seriously injuring two men. This happened on the same day as the Belturbet bombing in County Cavan which killed two teenagers and injured several other people. The bombings were believed to be the work of the Ulster Volunteer Force (UVF). This was not the only incident in Clones during the Troubles. On the 16 October 1972 at 11 p.m. a bomb exploded again - it was on Fermanagh Street in Clones, at the side of The Creighton Hotel in a yard known as the "Butter Yard"; nobody was injured in this attack. Gardaí said they believed the UVF linked loyalist paramilitary group the Red Hand Commandos were behind the bombing.

== Historical Features ==
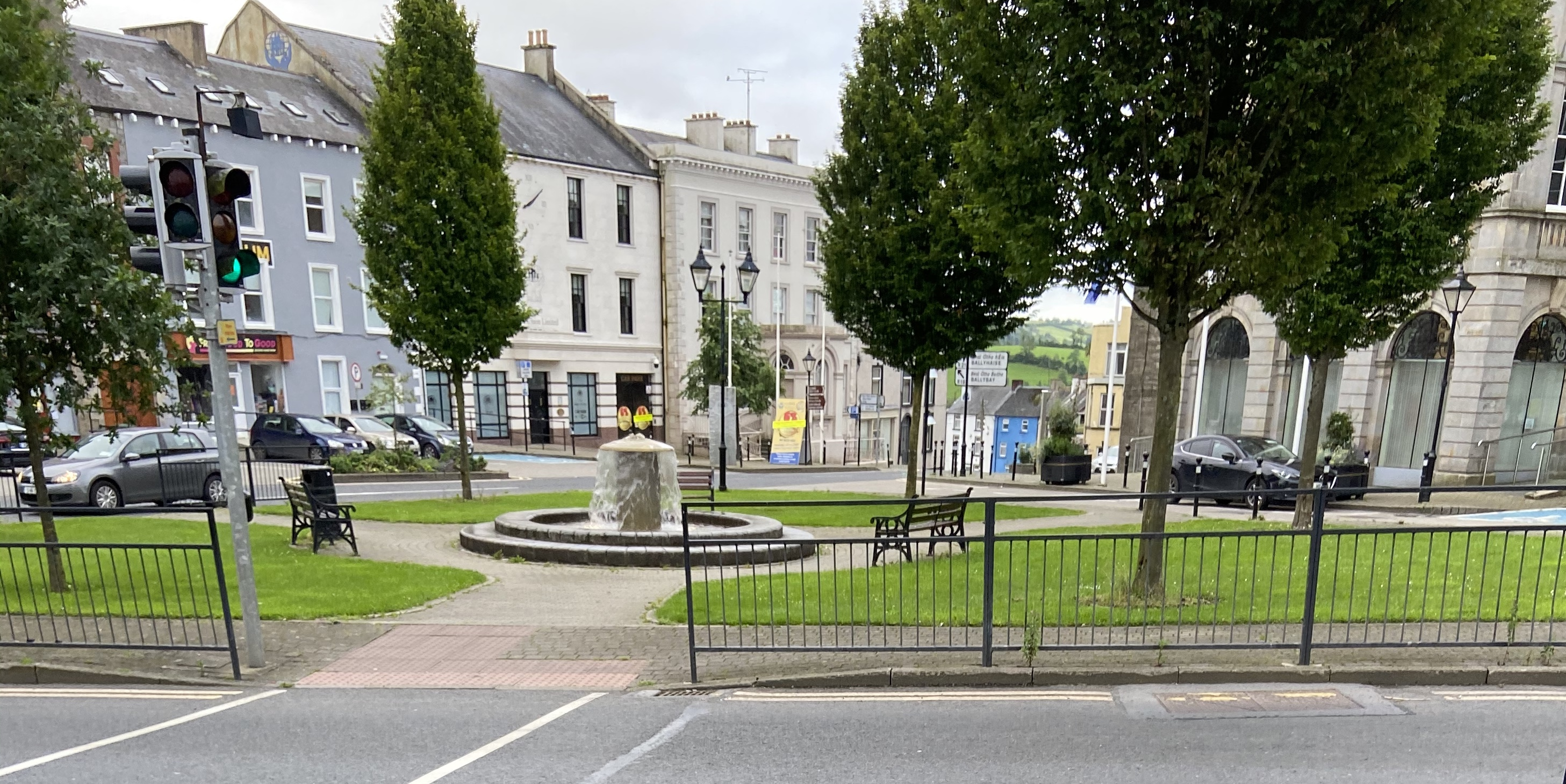
The Diamond in Clones.

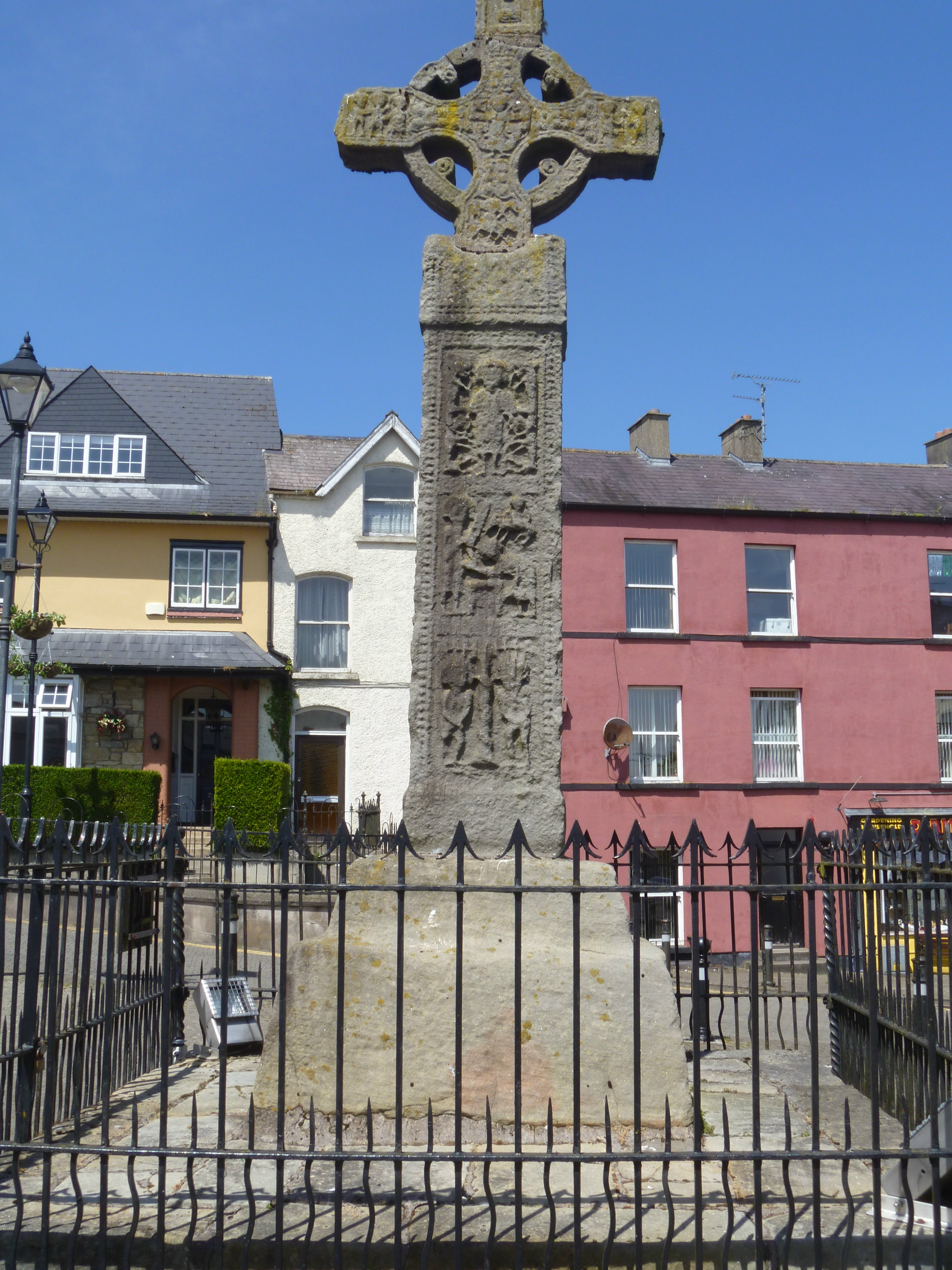
High Cross, Clones

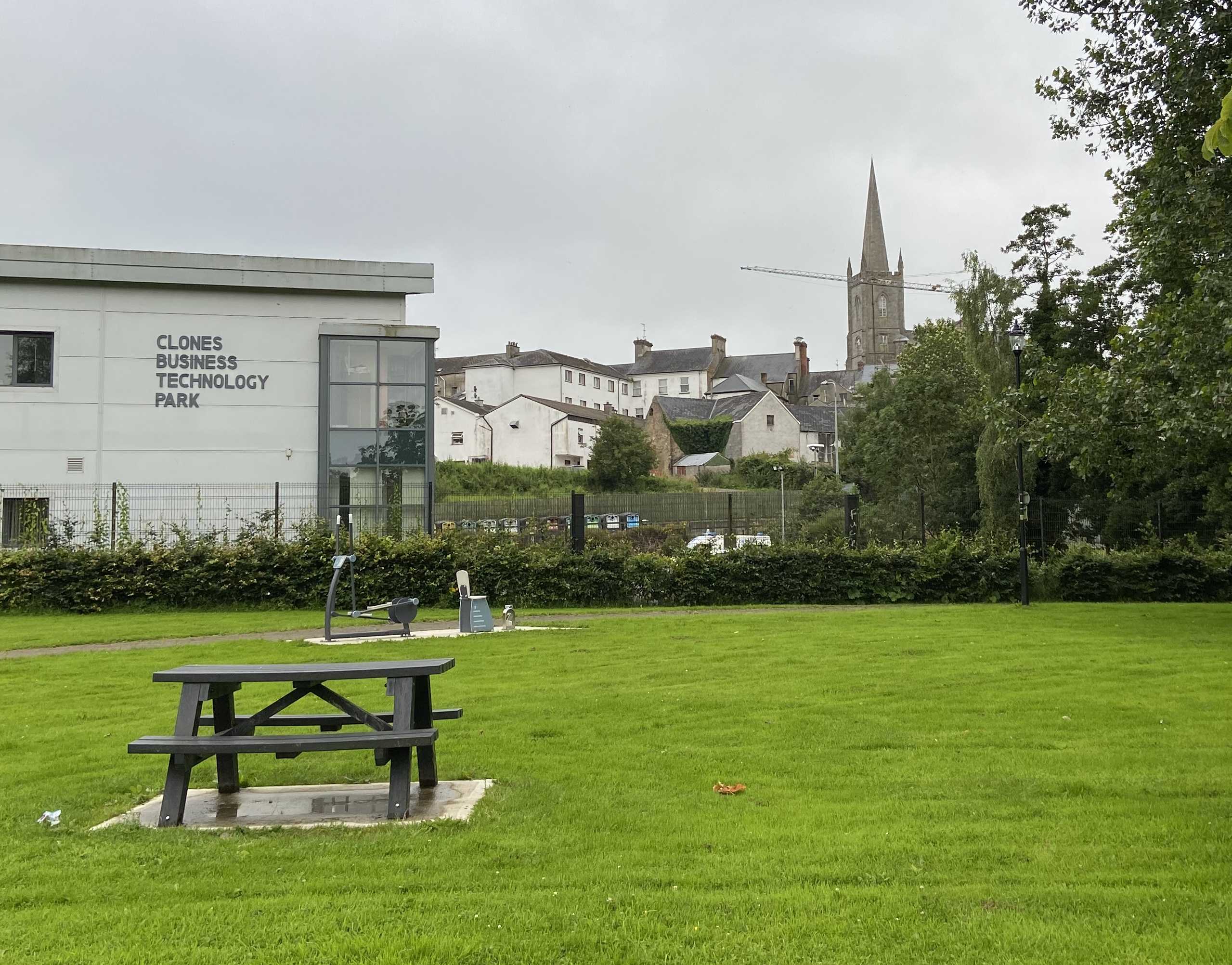
Barry McGuigan Park opened in 2015

=== Clones Abbey ===
Clones Abbey was founded in the 6th century by St. Tighernach on land granted by an Irish king. The remains that can be seen today include an Augustinian abbey, round tower, 18th century, pictographic tombstones and the stone sarcophagus of St. Tighernach.

=== Crossmoyle High Cross ===
Cross Moyle ('Cruisse Mhuile', meaning half cross) High Cross is a 15 foot tall or 5 metre (excluding the base) sandstone structure overlooking the Diamond (market place or town square). The shaft and head are separate pieces. The shaft is older dating from 825 to 875 AD, it is decorated with interlacing beads that run up the sides and form a collar at the top. Religious imagery is displayed in compartments which give a chronological summary of the bible. Such depictions include: 'The Fall of Man', 'The Adoration of the Magi' and 'The Multiplication of the Loaves and Fishes'. The head of the cross complements the shaft, featuring old testament and new testament images on either side.

=== Norman Motte and Bailey ===
The Norman Motte and Bailey are large earthen structures located behind the St Tighearnach's Church of Ireland. It consists of a steep central mound situated atop three concentric terraces and a bailey. It was constructed in 1211 and used by the Normans to launch an attack on County Tyrone. The attack resulted in a Norman defeat and the fortification was destroyed in 1212. Reports of 'extensive subterraneous passages' in relation to the fortification have been made by locals as far back as 1865.

=== St. Tighearnach's Church of Ireland ===
St Tighearnach's Church of Ireland is a limestone, cruciform Gothic revival Church of Ireland church. A sketch dating to 1586-7 shows evidence of churches being present on the site from before the land was leased to Sir Henry Duke by the English crown. The earliest inscription on St Tighearnach's Church reads: 1696. The actual Church of Ireland Parish itself predates this. The earliest recorded Rector of Clones was James Hygate, a native of Scotland, who was appointed in 1609. The 17th century structure was replaced in 1822–25 by a building designed by John Bowden, Board of First Fruits diocesan architect, or his successor William Farrell. It was remodeled in 1857–8 to become a pro-cathedral. It features a steep set of fourteen sandstone steps, a three staged tower with ashlar masonry and a crenellated parapet topped with a spire with pointed-arch windows with chamfered surrounds and hood mouldings.

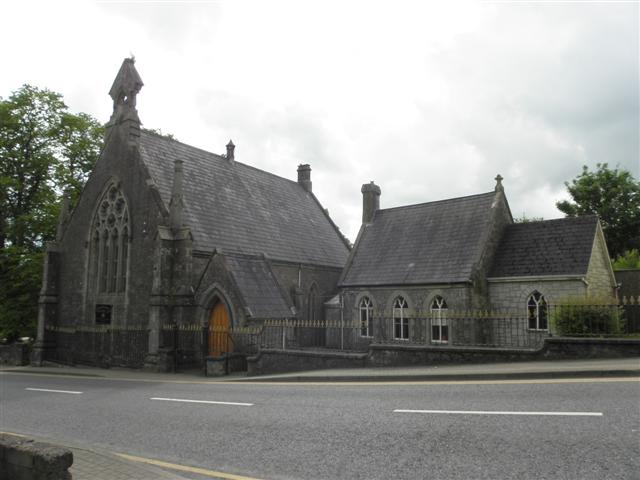
Clones Presbyterian Church

=== Clones Presbyterian Church ===
Built in 1858 and designed by architect Robert Young, Clones Presbyterian Church building features a rare 1873 J.C. Combe pipe organ. The congregation is part of the Monaghan Presbytery.

=== Plantation Castle ===
The Plantation Castle is a 20 by 40 feet (6 m × 12 m), three-story stone structure. The castle was constructed before 1640. A lease for Clones estate in 1636 mentions 'the Castle of Clones' in the possession of Nicholas Simpson. It lists features including a kitchen, brew house, stable and bawn. In 1641, the Protestant inhabitants of Clones took refuge in the castle after two hundred Jacobites assembled in Clones. The occupants of the castle sallied multiple times and, armed with muskets, harassed the Jacobite forces. This drove the Jacobites into negotiation with the occupants offering the security of their lives and property in exchange for the surrendering of the castle. The defenders acquiesced and returned to their already looted homes. The castle was 'rediscovered' in 2016 and its story was featured on BBC News and in The Irish Times. It is currently owned by Fáilte Ireland. Clones Community Forum applied for a Heritage Council grant to contract an archaeological team to investigate the site in 2016.

== Railways ==
Clones was linked by rail to Dundalk from 1855, Enniskillen from 1859, Cavan from 1862 and Armagh from 1863. Clones railway station was opened on 26 June 1858 by the Dundalk and Enniskillen Railway. From 1876 all of these lines were part of the Great Northern Railway (GNR).

The Partition of Ireland in 1922 made Clones a border post on the railway, which combined with road competition to cause the Great Northern to decline. In 1954, the governments of the Republic and Northern Ireland jointly nationalised the GNR and in 1957 Northern Ireland made the GNR close its lines from Armagh and Enniskillen to Clones. This made it impractical to continue services on the Cavan and Dundalk lines so the GNR withdrew passenger services on those lines as well, leaving Clones with no passenger trains and a freight service truncated at the border. The GNR closed Clones station to passenger traffic on 14 October 1957.

In 1958 the two states partitioned the GNR between the Ulster Transport Authority and CIÉ. CIÉ withdrew freight services from the Cavan line in 1959 and from the Dundalk line in 1960, leaving Clones with no railway at all. CIÉ closed Clones freight depot on 1 January 1960.

== Rivers and canal ==
The Finn River, which rises a few miles north-west of Roslea in the south-east of County Fermanagh, flows immediately to the south of Clones, while a stream called the Lacky River (also known as the Killylacky River) flows along the northern, western and south-western outskirts of Clones. The source of the Lacky River is Killylacky Lough, just to the west of Aghadrumsee in the south-east of County Fermanagh. The Lacky River flows into the Finn River close to Annies Bridge, just south-south-west of Clones, between Clones and Scotshouse.

The Cavan Road (part of the A3/N54) and the Newtownbutler Road (part of the A34) both cross the Lacky River on the outskirts of Clones, as do two sideroads: the Lacky Road and the Magheraveely Road.

The national inland waterways agency, Waterways Ireland, is planning to restore the Ulster Canal from the Wattlebridge area of Upper Lough Erne to Clones.

== Sport ==
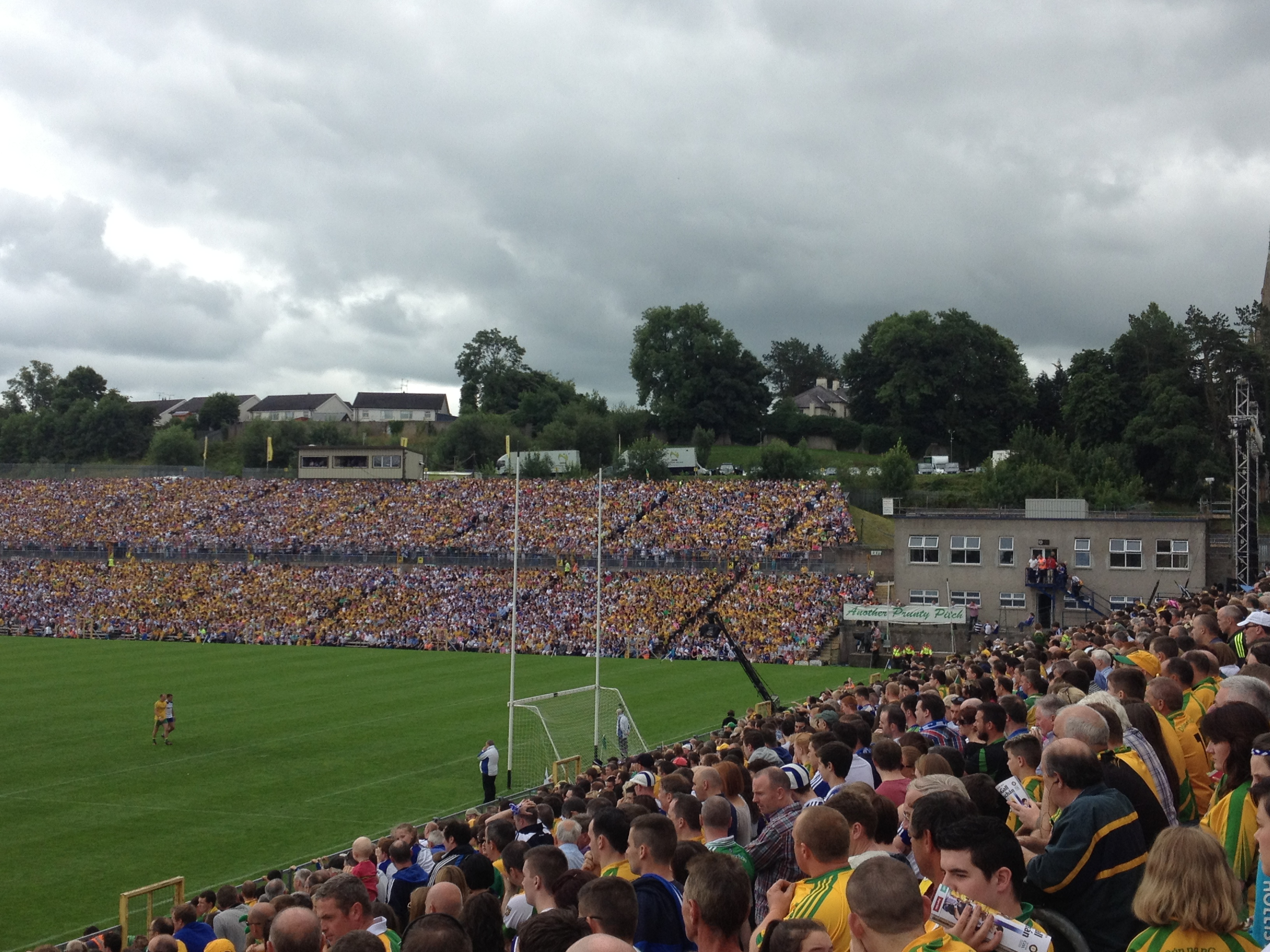
The final of the Ulster Senior Football Championship is usually held in Clones.

Clones is now mainly known in Ireland as being the location of the GAA stadium, St Tiernach's Park also the home of Monaghan GAA. This stadium is regularly used for inter-county matches during the Ulster provincial championship in Gaelic football, and traditionally hosts the final. The summer football season was therefore a major source of revenue for businesses in the town.

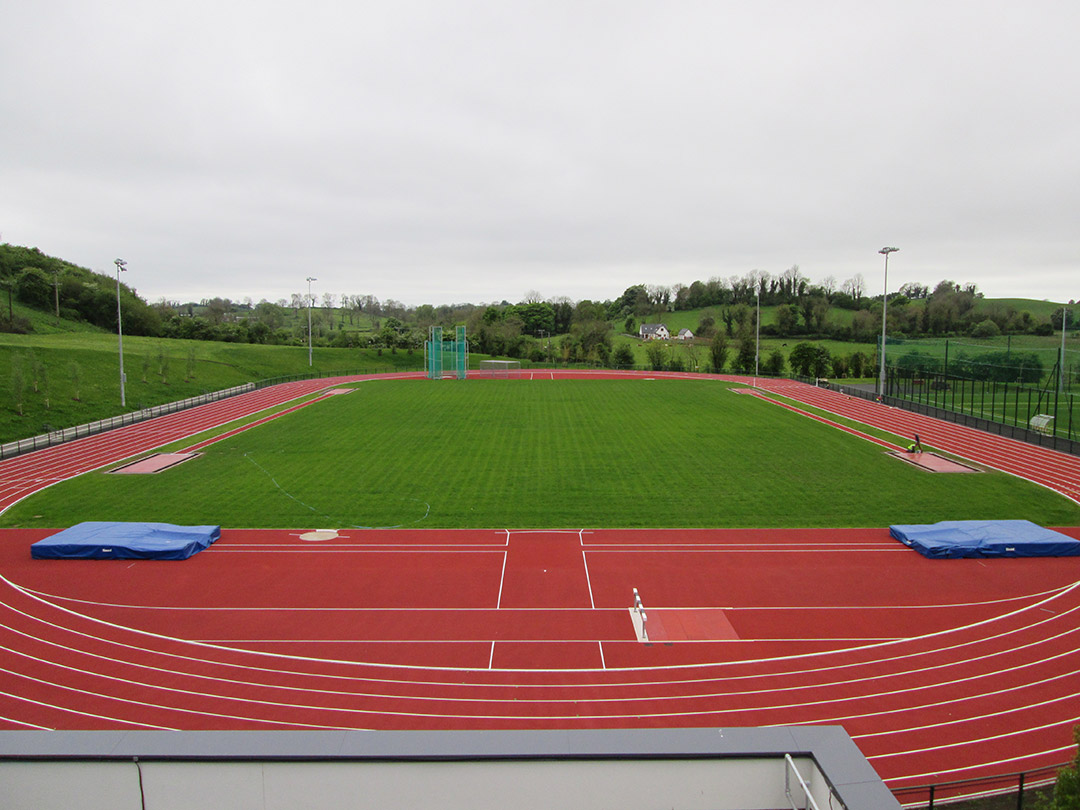
Running Track at the Peace Link, Clones

The PEACE Link Clones is a sporting facility on the edge of Clones. Its facilities include a 400m running track, in-field grass pitch, a 3G multi-purpose playing pitch, an indoor sports centre, changing facilities, and a gym.

A greyhound racing track operated from 1935 until 1962. The track was opened by the Clones Greyhound Racing Company Limited and raced under the Irish Coursing Club Rules up until November 1939 and later unlicensed until 1962. William Mealiff was a founding member of the company and the track was on the land near Bishopscourt. The pitch inside the track hosted a Clones rugby team that was formed in 1935.

== Tourism and Culture ==
=== Ulster Canal Stores and Clones Lace Museum ===
The Ulster Canal Stores is a visitor centre and restaurant. It is housed in an 1839 Canal Store house adjacent to the Ulster Canal itself. It is located beside Sean O'Casey park on Cara Street, on the N54 road. Within the building is the Clones Lace museum which houses examples of Clones lace dating as far back as the early 20th century. Its services includes a bistro, guided walking tours and tourist information. It offers disabled access and free on site parking.

=== Cassandra Hand Centre ===
The Cassandra Hand Centre is a non-profit community enterprise. It is housed in the Cassandra Hand school for girls and infants. It is located on Abbey Lane, opposite the Round Tower Graveyard. It contains boards on the history of Cassandra Hand and the famine in Clones. Its services include guided walking tours and a genealogy service.

=== Clones Library ===
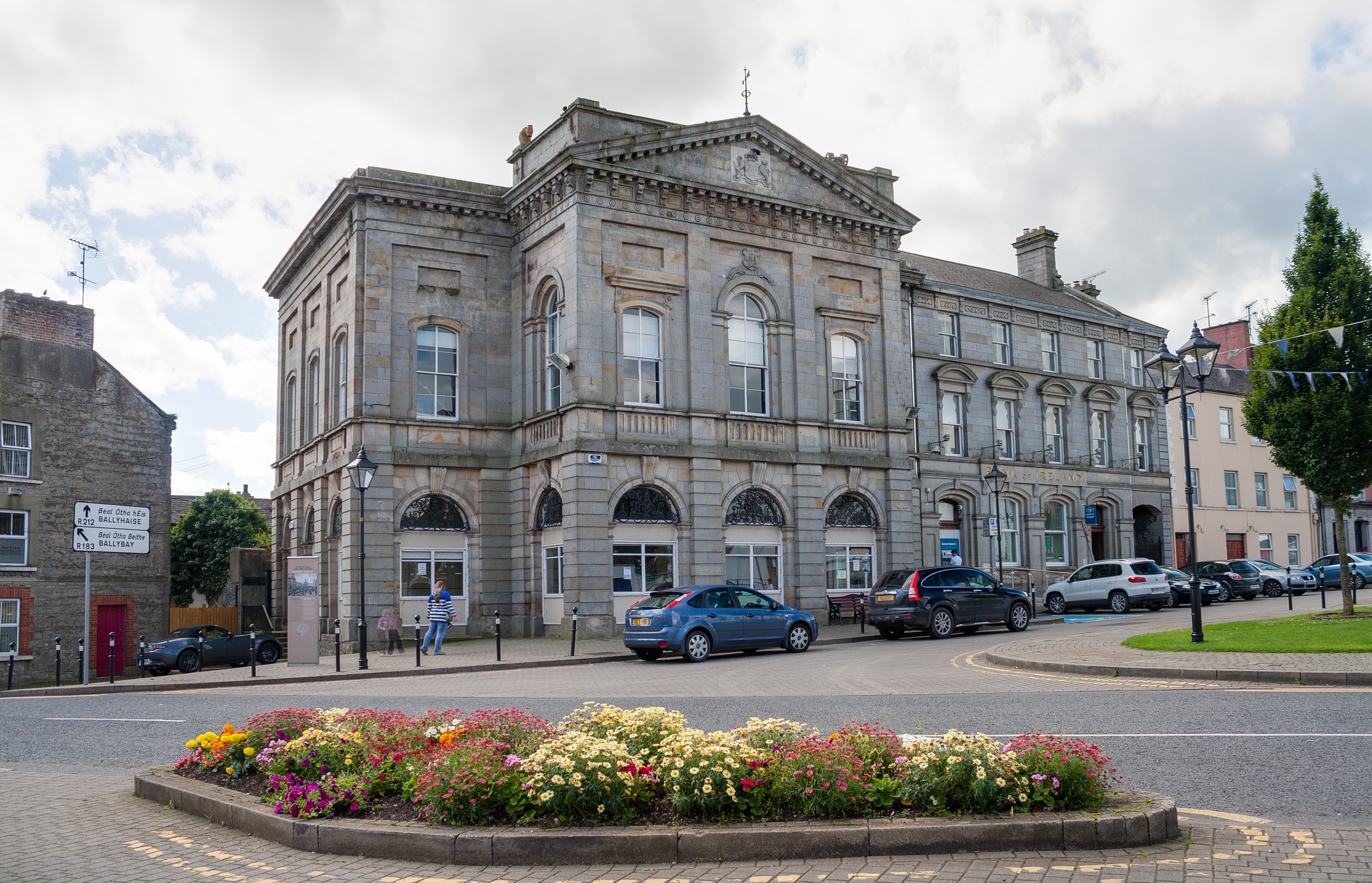
Clones Market House

Clones library offers major publications with information on Clones such as the Clogher Record. It contains reels of local and national newspapers that can be used for genealogical research. Previously housed in Clones Market House it is now in a modern building located on 98 avenue. Clones library hosts a number of outreach programmes and events including Arts and crafts, nursing home visits, creative writing classes and genealogy classes.

== Festivals and events ==
=== Clones Film Festival ===
Clones Film Festival is held annually during the October bank holiday. It involves the screening of international and Irish feature films and features a number of short film competitions.

=== St. Patrick's Eve ===
Clones has the tradition of holding its St. Patrick's day festivities on the evening before St. Patrick's day. The town is decorated and green lights illuminate the major landmarks. A parade procession is followed by music, dancing and fireworks.

=== Flat Lake Festival ===
The Flat Lake Festival was an annual arts, music and cultural event hosted by Kevin Allen from 2007 to 2011 at Hilton Park, a country house and demesne located between Clones and Scotshouse. From its launch in 2007, it hosted readings, comedy, music and theatre events within a farm estate. It was held in the demesne surrounding Hilton Park over a long weekend. It usually took place in mid-August.

=== Tours ===
The St. Tighernach's 'Pilgrim Pathhways' is a guided tour that covers the ecclesiastical monuments of Clones. It has been held during October and September. Guided tours for the Clones heritage trail have also been offered from the Ulster Canal Stores heritage centre on Saturdays between May and August.

== Notable people ==
- John George Bowes, Mayor of Toronto (1851–1853), was born in Clones
- Roger Boyle, bishop, is buried in Clones churchyard
- Thomas Bracken, poet who wrote "God Defend New Zealand", one of the national anthems of New Zealand, is from Clones
- Mark Connolly, footballer who grew up in Clones.
- Jonathan Douglas, footballer who grew up in Clones.
- Brigadier General Joseph Finegan, senior military commander who commanded the Confederate Army at the 1864 Battle of Olustee during the American Civil War, was born at Clones in 1814.
- James Graham, an Irish non-commissioned officer in the British Army during the Napoleonic Wars, reputed to be the "bravest man in the army".
- Sir Basil Kelly (1920–2008), UUP politician and senior-ranking judge in Northern Ireland. In the late 1960s and early 1970s, he served as the last Attorney General for Northern Ireland under the old Stormont regime. In 1973, he was appointed to the bench of the High Court of Northern Ireland. Born in the townland of Corkeenan on the outskirts of Clones as the son of a small farmer, he was raised from the age of five in East Belfast.
- John Joseph Lynch (1816–1888), first Archbishop of Toronto (1860–1888), was born here
- Kevin McBride, boxer, is from Clones
- Eugene McCabe (1930–2020), writer and playwright, comes from the town and is known for his novels such as Death and Nightingales
- Patrick McCabe, novelist and author of The Butcher Boy which is set in a thinly-disguised version of Clones. Parts of Neil Jordan's 1997 film adaptation of the book were filmed in the town. McCabe is honorary patron of the Clones Film Festival.
- Ruth McCabe, stage and screen actress, known for My Left Foot, Philomena and Fair City. daughter of Eugene
- Barry McGuigan, world featherweight champion boxer known as 'The Clones Cyclone', was born here
- James Cecil Parke, sportsman who was the 1912 Australasian Championships singles and doubles champion, 1914 Australasian Championships mixed doubles champion, 1912 Davis Cup winner, 1908 Summer Olympics silver medalist in tennis, and a Leinster and Irish rugby union player
- Alexander Pearce, a notorious cannibal convict who was executed in Van Diemen's Land in 1824, was from Clones

== Climate ==
Climate in this area has mild differences between highs and lows, and there is adequate rainfall year-round. The Köppen Climate Classification subtype for this climate is "Cfb" (Marine West Coast Climate/Oceanic climate).

Climate data for Clones (1978–2007, extremes 1951–2008)
Month	Jan	Feb	Mar	Apr	May	Jun	Jul	Aug	Sep	Oct	Nov	Dec	Year
Record high °C (°F)	14.8 (58.6)	16.3 (61.3)	20.6 (69.1)	21.9 (71.4)	25.9 (78.6)	29.3 (84.7)	30.5 (86.9)	28.8 (83.8)	25.4 (77.7)	22.1 (71.8)	16.9 (62.4)	14.8 (58.6)	30.5 (86.9)
Mean daily maximum °C (°F)	7.2 (45.0)	7.8 (46.0)	9.7 (49.5)	12.1 (53.8)	15.1 (59.2)	17.4 (63.3)	19.2 (66.6)	18.8 (65.8)	16.6 (61.9)	13.1 (55.6)	9.8 (49.6)	7.6 (45.7)	12.9 (55.2)
Daily mean °C (°F)	4.4 (39.9)	4.7 (40.5)	6.4 (43.5)	8.1 (46.6)	10.8 (51.4)	13.4 (56.1)	15.3 (59.5)	15.0 (59.0)	12.9 (55.2)	9.9 (49.8)	6.8 (44.2)	5.0 (41.0)	9.4 (48.9)
Mean daily minimum °C (°F)	1.6 (34.9)	1.6 (34.9)	3.0 (37.4)	4.2 (39.6)	6.5 (43.7)	9.5 (49.1)	11.4 (52.5)	11.1 (52.0)	9.2 (48.6)	6.6 (43.9)	3.9 (39.0)	2.3 (36.1)	5.9 (42.6)
Record low °C (°F)	−12.4 (9.7)	−9.9 (14.2)	−9.8 (14.4)	−4.2 (24.4)	−3.7 (25.3)	0.5 (32.9)	4.1 (39.4)	1.5 (34.7)	−0.9 (30.4)	−4.5 (23.9)	−8.1 (17.4)	−11.0 (12.2)	−12.4 (9.7)
Average precipitation mm (inches)	87.6 (3.45)	71.0 (2.80)	84.0 (3.31)	61.6 (2.43)	63.4 (2.50)	70.9 (2.79)	70.8 (2.79)	88.7 (3.49)	76.2 (3.00)	102.7 (4.04)	85.1 (3.35)	98.4 (3.87)	960.4 (37.81)
Average precipitation days (≥ 0.2 mm)	20	17	20	16	16	17	18	18	18	20	19	19	218
Average snowy days	4.9	4.7	3.8	1.1	0.3	0.0	0.0	0.0	0.0	0.0	0.6	2.6	18.0
Average relative humidity (%) (at 15:00 LST)	83.3	77.3	72.9	67.5	66.5	68.7	69.6	71.2	72.8	77.3	82.5	85.9	74.6
Mean monthly sunshine hours	46.5	62.2	93.0	138.0	173.6	138.0	136.4	130.2	108.0	86.8	54.0	37.2	1,203.9
Mean daily sunshine hours	1.5	2.2	3.0	4.6	5.6	4.6	4.4	4.2	3.6	2.8	1.8	1.2	3.3
Source: Met Éireann

== Annalistic references ==
See the Annals of Inisfallen (AI).

- AI806.1 Kl. Gormgal son of Dindathach, abbot of Ard Macna and Cluain Eóis, rested.

== See also ==
- List of towns and villages in the Republic of Ireland
- List of market houses in the Republic of Ireland
- Clones, County Fermanagh
