= Agnes Escapes from the Nursing Home =

Animated film by Eileen O'Meara

Agnes Escapes from the Nursing Home is a 16mm, hand-painted, experimental animated film by Eileen O'Meara. It was jury-selected for Sundance Film Festival, London Film Festival, Chicago International Film Festival, and aired on Showtime Cable Network, The Movie Channel, and PBS.

Still from Agnes Escapes from the Nursing Home by Eileen O'Meara, used with permission

== Reviews ==
"Threaded through this program are four short films, of which the most remarkable (is) Agnes Escapes From the Nursing Home, a cel-animation by the extremely gifted Eileen O'Meara, whose colors and images are delicate and mysterious..." Sheila Benson, Los Angeles Times

"The poetic reflections of a disturbed mind: remarkable animation." John Gillett, The London Film Festival

"A hauntingly beautiful film." Beverly Freeman, Coe Films

== Synopsis ==
“The message of this (film) depends solely on the viewer's interpretation of how Agnes escapes from the nursing home. The reviewer envisions Agnes escaping through death, thereby experiencing freedom from a life of many choices...” Dolly Partridge, Media Review

"A bittersweet animation that looks deeply into the thoughts of Agnes, taking us on one of her daily journeys." Sundance Film Festival, Sundance Institute

== Festivals and screenings ==
- Sundance Film Festival
- The London Film Festival
- Chicago International Film Festival
- Krakow Film Festival
- Rendezvous With Madness
- Women in the Director's Chair Film and Video Festival

== See also ==
- Eileen O'Meara
- UNICEF Cartoons for Children's Rights
- That Strange Person
- Panic Attack!
