= List of animated feature films of the 1990s =

Lists of animated feature films released in the 1990s organized by year of release:

- List of animated feature films of 1990
- List of animated feature films of 1991
- List of animated feature films of 1992
- List of animated feature films of 1993
- List of animated feature films of 1994
- List of animated feature films of 1995
- List of animated feature films of 1996
- List of animated feature films of 1997
- List of animated feature films of 1998
- List of animated feature films of 1999

== See also ==
- List of highest-grossing animated films of the 1990s
