= Clones Market House =

Municipal building in County Monaghan, Ireland

- Halla an Bhaile Cluain Eois
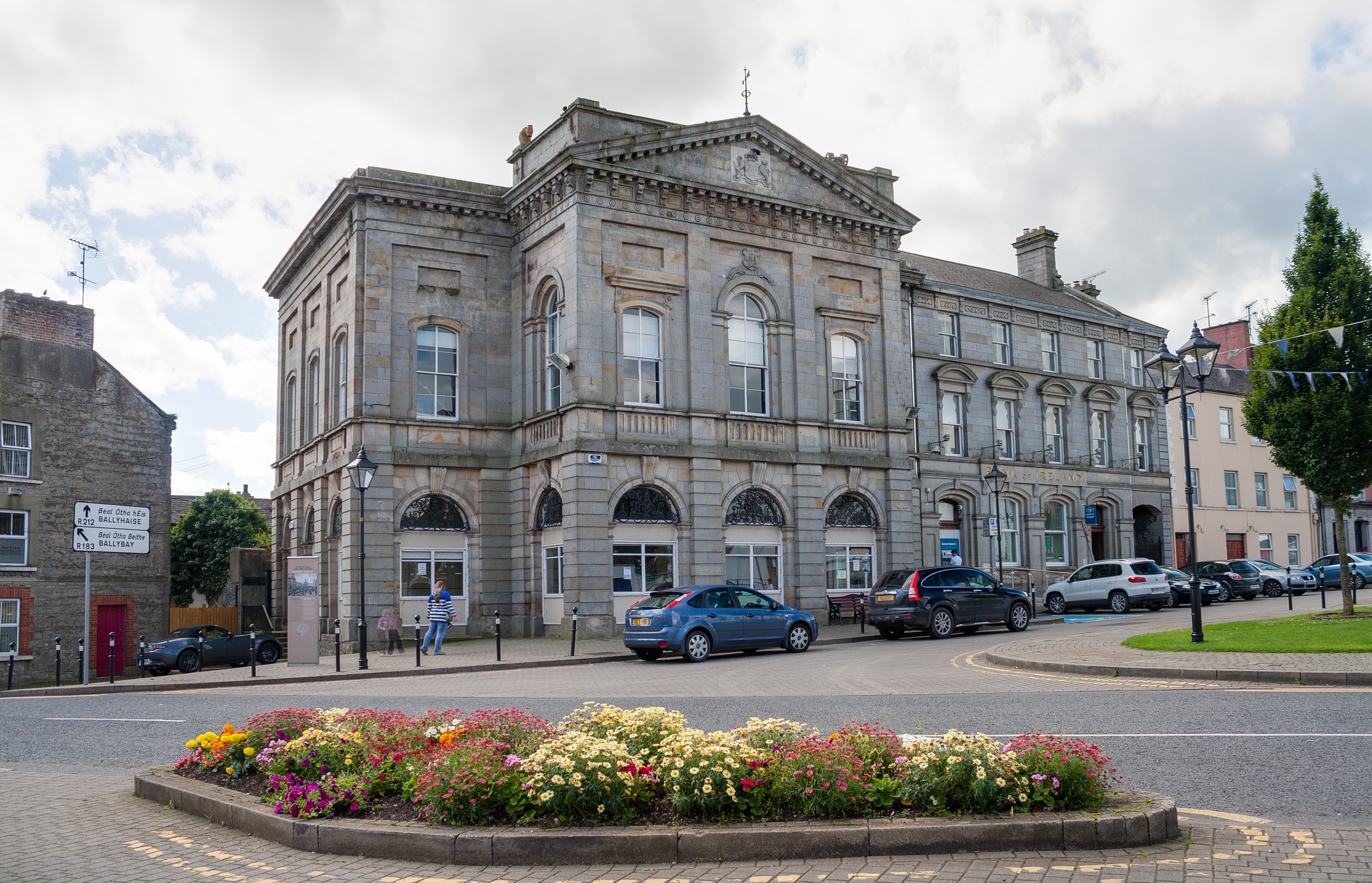
- Clones Market House

- Location within Ireland

General information
- Architectural style: Neoclassical style
- Location: The Diamond, Clones, Ireland
- Coordinates: 54.1789°N 7.2318°W
- Completed: 1846

Design and construction
- Architect: William Deane Butler

Clones Market House (Irish: Teach an Mhargaidh Cluain Eois), also known as Clones Town Hall (Irish: Halla an Bhaile Cluain Eois) is a municipal building at The Diamond in Clones, County Monaghan, Ireland. It is currently used by Monaghan County Council as a venue for the delivery of local services.

== History ==
The first market house at Clones was commissioned by Richard Lennard, husband of Anne Barrett-Lennard, 16th Baroness Dacre in the 18th century. The Lennard family had been the principal land-owners in the area since the dissolution of the monasteries. By the early 1840s, the building was very dilapidated and in need of replacement. The current building was commissioned by Sir Thomas Barrett-Lennard, 1st Baronet, who was the illegitimate son of Thomas Barrett-Lennard, 17th Baron Dacre. As well as being the local landowner and the former member of parliament for South Essex, Thomas Barrett-Lennard was an advocate of Catholic emancipation and presented a petition in that regard from the people of Clones to the UK Parliament.

The new building was designed by William Deane Butler in the neoclassical style, built in ashlar stone and was completed in 1846. The design involved a symmetrical main frontage of five bays facing onto The Diamond. The central section of three bays, which was projected forward, featured three round headed openings with voussoirs and keystones on the ground floor; on the first floor the central bay was fenestrated by a round headed sash window with a balustrade, an architrave and a keystone, while the bays flanking it were fenestrated by segmental headed sash windows with balustrades, architraves and cornices. The outer bays were fenestrated in a similar style. The central section was surmounted by a modillioned pediment, containing the coat of arms of Richard Lennard, which had been recovered from the earlier market house, in the tympanum. Internally, the principal rooms were a market hall on the ground floor and an assembly room on the first floor.

The building became an important venue for public meetings: the entertainer, Percy French, performed there in April 1890 and April 1897, while speakers included the leader of the Irish Citizen Army, James Connolly, in September 1899, and the Irish republican, Patrick Pearse, in November 1906. The building was extended to the northwest, to a design by James Kelly in 1909. The county library, which had been established on the first floor in 1828, moved to the ground floor in 1966, and then relocated to new premises in Jubilee Road in 2008.

Although the market house was used for public meetings, Clones Urban District Council, which was superseded by Clones Town Council in 2002, held its meetings in Clones Courthouse, and established administrative offices at the Pringle Building in Monaghan Street. An extensive programme of works, involving roof restoration, new guttering and re-pointing, was carried out to a design by Alastair Coey Architects and completed in 2014. The works allowed Monaghan County Council to bring the building back into use by as a venue for the delivery of local services.
