= Eileen O'Meara =

American film director

Eileen O'Meara is an American artist known for her experimental animated films Agnes Escapes from the Nursing Home, That Strange Person, Panic Attack! and the HBO/UNICEF Cartoon for Children's Rights The Right to Express Yourself.

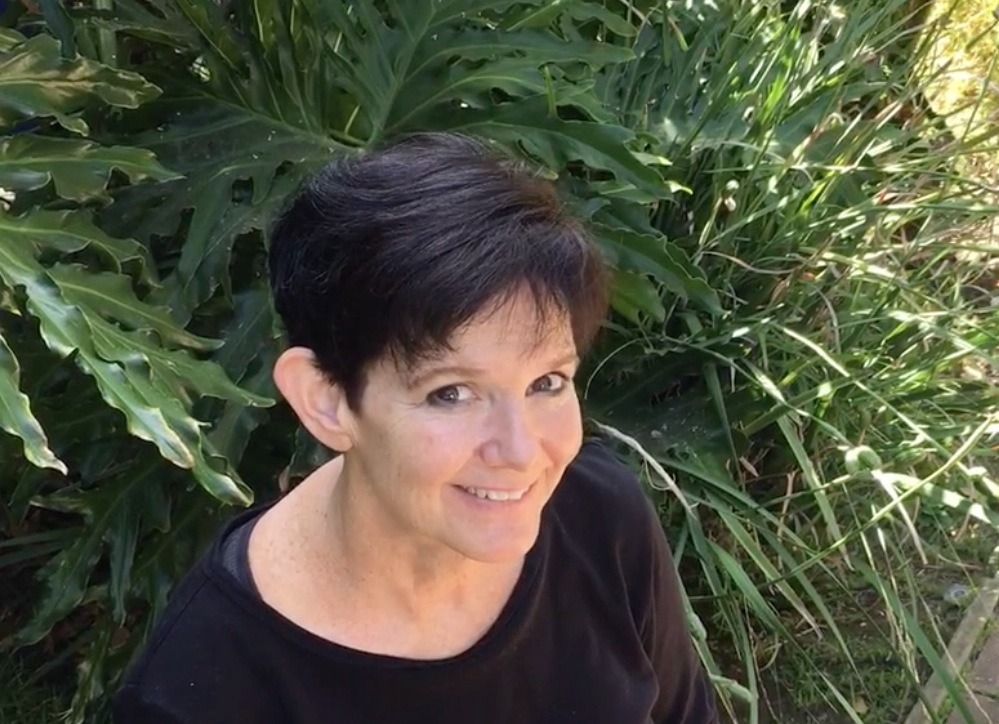

== Career ==
Eileen O’Meara has produced and directed animated spots and shorts for clients including HBO, Warner Home Video, Motown, Heal The Bay, Channel One, and WEA Latina.

Her independent short films Agnes Escapes from the Nursing Home, That Strange Person, and Panic Attack! have screened in multiple venues, including the Sundance Film Festival, BFI London Film Festival, PBS, The Movie Channel, and Showtime.

O'Meara's work is featured in Get Animated! Creating Professional Cartoon Animation on your Home Computer by Tim Maloney, and Making it Big in Shorts: The Ultimate Filmmakers Guide to Short Films by Kim Adelman.

== Grants ==
O’Meara received the National Endowment for the Arts Media Arts Fellowship from the California Arts Council, Women In Film Foundation's Hollywood Film & Video Grant, and the Stephen Hunter Flick-Creative Cafe Post Production Grant
