= A Piece of Phantasmagoria =

1995 Japanese animated television series

- ア・ピース・オブ ファンタスマゴリア
- Genre: Science fiction, fantasy
- Created by: Shigeru Tamura
- Written by: Shinichi Tsuda
- Directed by: Shigeru Tamura
- Music by: Teshikai Utollo
- Country of origin: Japan
- Original language: Japanese
- No. of episodes: 15

Production
- Running time: approximately 5 minutes

Original release
- Release: June 1995 – July 1995

A Piece of Phantasmagoria (Japanese: ア・ピース・オブ ファンタスマゴリア, stylized as a piece of PHANTASMAGORIA) is a collection of fifteen Japanese animated shorts created by illustrator Shigeru Tamura in 1995. Set on Tamura's fictional planet Phantasmagoria, the shorts were produced as part of a CD-ROM multimedia work based on Tamura's 1989 illustrated book Phantasmagoria, and were also broadcast on Japanese satellite television in 1995. Four of the shorts were released theatrically in Japan in 1998, while Bandai Visual released the complete collection on DVD as A Piece of Phantasmagoria in 1999.

The series draws on the imaginary world Tamura had developed in his earlier illustrated works, including his 1989 book Phantasmagoria. Its stories combine science fiction and fantasy imagery with a contemplative, sometimes melancholy tone. The Encyclopedia of Science Fiction characterized the series as an example of absurdist science fiction and praised the more successful episodes for their evocative surrealism.

A Piece of Phantasmagoria received the Grand Prix (Minister of Posts and Telecommunications Award) at the 1995 AMD Awards, and the Entertainment Award at the 1995 Multimedia Grand Prix.

== Premise ==
The series consists of fifteen short stories set on Phantasmagoria, a small planet which the narrator says was discovered while travelling through the realm of dreams. The episodes are generally self-contained and portray unusual places, inhabitants and events on the planet, combining everyday activities with fantastic or science-fictional phenomena.

Among the stories is one about a planetarium resembling an old-fashioned reel-to-reel projector whose operator changes reels to display the constellations appropriate to each season. Another takes place on a solid, glass-like ocean, across which telegraph poles run to work; Tamura later revisited this setting in Glassy Ocean (1998). Other episodes concern a gigantic light bulb partly buried in a desert, an aged star returning to the Altair Bar after billions of years, and a scientist attempting to create an artificial moon while corresponding with his sick daughter. In the Digital Zone, everything takes a cubic form but proves impermanent.

Each story concludes by returning to the framing device of Phantasmagoria as a distant world encountered during a journey through dreams.

== Production ==
Tamura had developed the fictional planet Phantasmagoria in his illustrated work before producing the animation. In March 1989, Kaku-sha published his 119-page illustrated book Phantasmagoria (ファンタスマゴリア), which is identified as the source for the later animation.

Producer Mitsuo Shionaga later recalled that, after completing Tamura's Ginga no Uo: Ursa Minor Blue (1993), the creators wanted to make new animation using MacroMind Director. For the Phantasmagoria project, stories and settings from Tamura's books were developed into connected scenarios, with Shinichi Tsuda preparing the screenplay and Tamura producing new artwork for the software. The animation was produced digitally, within a palette limited to 256 colours.

The resulting multimedia work was released in 1995 as CD-ROM software. Contemporary and later Japanese sources describe the original work as comprising fifteen animated stories. Tamura's archived official website also identifies a 1995 version produced by Toshiba EMI as an "early version" (初期バージョン).<

The fifteen animated shorts were also broadcast on Japanese satellite television between June and July 1995; the anime broadcast database Animejikan lists the work as a 15-episode BS broadcast. The Encyclopedia of Science Fiction likewise describes A Piece of Phantasmagoria as a 1995 television series consisting of fifteen five-minute episodes.

Tamura later developed this material into A Piece of Phantasmagoria. He supervised the animated production and was credited with the original work and illustrations. Mitsuo Shionaga served as producer, Akiyuki Terashima handled episode direction, and Shinichi Tsuda wrote the screenplay. Kyoko Kashiwagi and Mitsuhiro Kimura were credited as animators. The music was composed by Teshikai Utollo, who had also composed the score for Tamura's earlier animated film Ginga no Uo: Ursa Minor Blue (1993). Narration was performed by musician Morio Agata and singer Kaori Kano.

== Episode list ==
The series consists of the following fifteen episodes:

1. Aurora Show (オーロラショウ)
2. Rainbow Valley Paint Factory (虹の谷絵の具工場)
3. Glassy Ocean (ガラスの海)
4. Southern Continent (南の大陸)
5. The Day the Light Bulb Lit Up (電球発光の日)
6. Ghost Town (ゴーストタウン)
7. Mushroom Village (キノコ村)
8. Moonshine (密造酒)
9. Cactus Town (サボテンの街)
10. Honyara Bakery (ほんやらベーカリー)
11. Altair Bar (アルタイルの酒場)
12. Artificial Moon (人工の月)
13. Digital Zone (デジタルゾーン)
14. Night of the Shooting Stars (流れ星の夜)
15. Journey's End (旅の終わり)

== Reception ==
The Encyclopedia of Science Fiction described the episodes as generally reflective in tone, alternating between whimsy and melancholy, with music complementing their mood. It considered some of the stories slight and suggested that their slow pace might make them less successful as children's animation than the books on which they were based, but praised other episodes for achieving a calm and evocative form of surrealism.

The series received two Japanese multimedia awards in 1995. At the AMD Awards it received the Grand Prix, also designated the Minister of Posts and Telecommunications Award, while at the Multimedia Grand Prix it received the Entertainment Award. The Hachioji Yume Art Museum later featured the work in a 2005 retrospective devoted to Tamura, alongside Ginga no Uo: Ursa Minor Blue and Glassy Ocean.

== Related works ==
Tamura's 1989 Phantasmagoria established the fictional planet that provides the setting for the animated series. One episode of A Piece of Phantasmagoria, set on a sea with a solid glass-like surface, shares its setting with Tamura's later animated short Glassy Ocean (1998).

Four of the fifteen animated stories were subsequently selected for a 20-minute theatrical programme titled Phantasmagoria, which opened in Japan on 14 November 1998. Bandai Visual released the complete fifteen-story work on DVD under the title A Piece of Phantasmagoria on 25 March 1999. Bandai lists its production year as 1995 and its total running time as approximately 78 minutes. The complete work was also catalogued as comprising fifteen stories with a running time of approximately 78 minutes.

Tamura's archived official website lists several later Phantasmagoria multimedia releases, including a 1997 CD-ROM collection of original artwork, the CD-ROM Amusement Planet Phantasmagoria (2002), and Memories of Phantasmagoria (2002), a music CD by Teshikai Utollo.
