= A Merry Mirthworm Christmas =

1984 animated television special

A Merry Mirthworm Christmas is an animated television special, produced by Perennial Pictures. It premiered on the Showtime Cable Network on December 14, 1984. The film features a cast of Mirthworms, which are described as anthropomorphic worms about 2 in (51 mm) long, who live in the tiny town of Wormingham. Mirthworms tend to use proper nouns that play on the word "worm". The characters live in the town of Wormingham, the main character is named Bert Worm, and the antagonist is named Wormaline Wiggler.

The show was followed by two additional Mirthworm specials, A Mirthworm Masquerade (1987) and Mirthworms on Stage (1989).

== A Merry Mirthworm Christmas ==
Bert Worm has just moved into the town of Wormingham. Excited for the Christmas season he is invited by his neighbor, Crystal Crawler, to assist in decorating the Town Hall. Due to his clumsiness, chaos is caused in the Town Hall, and holiday decorations are knocked over and broken. Bert is then asked by chairworm Wormaline Wiggler to leave immediately, which he does.

Bert proceeds to sing a song about how he is so lonely, and just wanted to make some friends. He writes a note, but just before he leaves, Crystal appears at his door inviting him to come to the party. Bert refuses because of what he had done that morning and tells Crystal to head to the party without him. Crystal then leaves to the party to find out who asked Bert to not come, but after she leaves, Bert leaves the house. At the party, Crystal tells everyone about how hard he tried to fit in, and says that Christmas is for everyone and she says that Bert deserves another chance. The Mayor shows up shortly after, and is unhappy with Wormaline for asking Bert to leave, stating that Christmas is for everyone, the mayor threatens to remove Wormaline from her position as chairworm. The Mirthworms then rush to Bert's house only to realize that Bert has run away. Refusing to give up, Wilbur Diggs starts up search parties to find Bert.

The search proceeds, but the weather gets so bad that the Mirthworms have no choice but to return to Wormingham. Upon arrival at Town Hall many of the Mirthworms express how sad they are that Bert has left, stating that they really liked him. Crystal is incredibly sad, because she said that Bert is her friend and him being her friend was the best thing he could be. As the Mirthworms are moping about, Bert wakes up near the tree asking why they are so sad, they state that it is because they fear the worst for Bert (not realizing that it was he who asked them). When they realize that Bert is there, they are surprised and happy. Bert explains that it got so cold that he decided to come back to the Town Hall and fell asleep.

Under pressure from the mayor Wormaline apologizes to Bert for asking him to leave. Despite all of this, the Mayor still removes her from chairworm position, and instead gives her a different Christmas gift: giving Bert a second chance. Then Crystal tells Bert that he can contribute to the Christmas celebrations with his singing. Bert proceeds to sing "Deck the Halls", and "I Wish You a Merry Christmas" (a modified version of "We Wish You a Merry Christmas").

== A Mirthworm Masquerade ==
A Mirthworm Masquerade first aired on April 11, 1987.

The Mirthworms of Wormingham are all excited about the annual Masquerade Ball, and Bert is planning to ask Crystal to be his date. But Wormaline Wiggler forces Bert to dress as Prince Pringle and accompany her to the ball when the real prince fails to show up, forcing Bert to break Crystal's heart.

At the ball, Bert causes trouble, then leaves. The real Prince Pringle then arrives and puts on Bert's discarded mask, causing Wormaline to mistake him for Bert and treat him in her usual unpleasant matter. Meanwhile, Bert finds Crystal and hurries to get her to the ball. Upon arriving, Crystal is named Queen of the ball. Wormaline's anger at this changes to horror when Prince Pringle reveals himself, and she realizes just who she had been mistreating. Crystal kisses Bert on the cheek.

== Mirthworms on Stage ==
Mirthworms on Stage first aired on July 20, 1989,

The Mirthworms take center stage at the Wormingham Bowl as they present "Sleeping Beauty." Wormaline Wiggler tries to wrangle the lead but Crystal Crawler wins the prize. Crystal is reluctant to do so, as she suffers from stage fright, but Bert convinces her. Wormaline attempts to steal the show, but her sneaky shenanigans bring down the house instead.

== Cast ==
The voice cast included:

- Jerry Reynolds: Bert Worm, Teddy Toddlers, Wilbur Diggs, Baggs, Homer, Prince Pringle, Armbruster
- Rachel Rutledge: Crystal Crawler, Gertie
- Miki Mathioudakis: Wormaline Wiggler
- Peggy Nicholson: Eulalia Inch, Agnes, Dribble
- Russ Harris: Mayor Filmore Q. Pettiworm, Eudora Vanderworm
- Michael N. Ruggiero: Brooks
- Adam Dykstra: Chester, Arnold

== Availability ==
All three cartoons have been individually released on VHS in America by Family Home Entertainment. A Merry Mirthworm Christmas and A Mirthworm Masquerade were released in the UK on VHS by Castle Vision.

In 2006, both A Merry Mirthworm Christmas and A Mirthworm Masquerade were released on DVD in Australia by MRA Entertainment.

A Merry Mirthworm Christmas was featured on a promotional Christmas DVD released by the Daily Mail, accompanied with the cartoon, The Glo Friends Save Christmas. In 2007, all three films were released for digital download in America by GoDigital, as of August 2018 all three films have now been made available in the UK on digital through Amazon Instant, with Mirthworms on Stage now being made available to UK viewing audiences following no VHS release, but its only UK December 26, 1989 transmission on BBC1.
