= Shigeru Tamura (illustrator) =

Japanese illustrator

- たむらしげる
- Born: November 26, 1949 (age 76); Kamata, Ota Ward, Tokyo
- Occupations: Illustrator; Animator; Manga artist
- Known for: Glassy Ocean
- Website: Official homepage

Shigeru Tamura (田村 茂, Tamura Shigeru) is a Japanese illustrator, animator, filmmaker, and manga artist. His animated works have included Glassy Ocean, for which he won the 1998 Japan Media Arts Festival Animation Award; Ursa Minor Blue, which he also wrote and directed; and A Piece of Phantasmagoria.

He has also contributed to the now-defunct manga magazine Garo, and illustrated covers for the magazines Sun Power, TV Station, and Big Gold. Additionally, he illustrated the cover for the 2001 Artist House publication of Stephen King's The Eyes of the Dragon.

Tamura's artwork was included in an exhibition of Japanese manga artists at Cornerhouse, 12 May to 24 June 2001.

His illustrations have also been used on shopping bags for Okadoya-More's.

== Published works ==
Filmography
Year	Title	Director	Screenwriter	Source Author	Illustrator	Supervisor	Notes
1993	Ursa Minor Blue	Yes	Yes	Yes	Yes	No	
1998	Glassy Ocean	Yes	Yes	Yes	Yes	No	
1999	A Piece of Phantasmagoria	No	No	Yes	Yes	Yes	Directed by Akiyuki Terashima; script written by Shinichi Tsuda
