= Perennial Pictures Film Corporation =

American animation studio

- Industry: Animation
- Founded: 1979; 47 years ago
- Founder: G. Brian (Jerry) Reynolds; Russ Harris
- Headquarters: Indianapolis, Indiana

Perennial Pictures Film Corporation is an independent American animated cartoon studio founded by G. Brian (Jerry) Reynolds and Russ Harris in 1979. Located in Indianapolis, Indiana, the studio made its initial entry into the marketplace producing local and regional animated television commercials. In 1982, Michael N. Ruggiero joined the studio as the third partner, and by 1984, the studio had attained its original goal and released its first animated television special, A Merry Mirthworm Christmas, to the Showtime Cable Network.

Over the years, the studio has produced a movie, along with many half-hour television specials and shorts (including O. Ratz - Rat in a Hot Tin Can). These productions have enjoyed successful telecasts on major cable networks, including Nickelodeon, Cartoon Network, The Family Channel, HBO, and The Disney Channel.

In 2005, the studio converted all production to digital media, allowing the company to expand into additional entertainment platforms. The studio's first Flash animation production, Handycat: Bees-ness As Usual, a 7-minute short, was produced in conjunction with Frederator Studios for Nickelodeon and was part of the Random! Cartoons series that debuted in 2009.

In 2009, the studio continued development and production on new programming and web content for its Crawford the Cat pre-K to 1st-grade property. Debuting internationally in 2003 on Discovery Kids UK, the Crawford the Cat characters were first introduced in a series of thirteen 5-minute shorts called Crawford's Corner. In 2018, ‘Crawford the Cat’s Christmas’ debuted on Amazon Prime Video.
