= That Strange Person =

1998 film directed by Eileen O'Meara

- Directed by: Eileen O'Meara
- Written by: Eileen O'Meara
- Starring: Jane Boegel (voice-over)
- Release date: June 1998 (Florida Film Festival)
- Running time: 5 minutes
- Country: United States
- Language: English

That Strange Person is a hand-painted, 35mm, cel-animated film directed by Eileen O'Meara. It is described as "an animated exploration of the stranger in the mirror".

== Cast and crew ==
- Jane Boegel – voice-over
- Eileen O'Meara – director/animator
- Stephen Hunter Flick, Charles Maynes – sound design

== Release, festivals and awards ==
The film was released at Florida Film Festival in June 1998. It won the Gold Prize at WorldFest-Houston International Film Festival in Experimental Animation, First Prize at Savannah Film Festival, Jury Awards for Animated Short at Florida and Louisville Film Festivals, and Silver Prize at Philadelphia International Film Festival. It was selected for the 1998 Sundance Film Festival, Dresden International Film Festival, Los Angeles Film Festival, and for the 1999 Atlanta Film Festival. It was distributed by David Russell's Big Film Shorts, and released on Warner Home Video Short 5-Diversity and Dancing with the Sun: a Compilation of Selected Short Films from the Sundance Film Festival.

== See also ==
- Panic Attack!
- Agnes Escapes from the Nursing Home
- Jamais vu
