= List of highest-grossing animated films of the 1990s =

The following are lists of the highest-grossing animated films of the 1990s.

== Highest-grossing animated films of the 1990s ==
Figures are given in U.S. dollars (USD). Walt Disney Feature Animation is the most represented animation studio with 10 films on the list and has the highest total of any animation studio in that decade. Distributors listed are for the original theatrical release.

Top 50
Rank	Title	Country	Producer	Distributor	Worldwide gross	Year	Ref.
1	The Lion King	U.S.	Walt Disney Pictures/Walt Disney Animation Studios	Buena Vista Pictures Distribution	$968,483,777	1994	
2	Aladdin	U.S.	Walt Disney Pictures/Walt Disney Animation Studios	Buena Vista Pictures Distribution	$504,050,219	1992	
3	Toy Story 2	U.S.	Walt Disney Pictures/Pixar Animation Studios	Buena Vista Pictures Distribution	$497,366,869	1999	
4	Tarzan	U.S.	Walt Disney Pictures/Walt Disney Animation Studios	Buena Vista Pictures Distribution	$448,191,819	1999	
5	Beauty and the Beast	U.S.	Walt Disney Pictures/Walt Disney Animation Studios	Buena Vista Pictures Distribution	$424,967,620	1991	
6	Toy Story	U.S.	Walt Disney Pictures/Pixar Animation Studios	Buena Vista Pictures Distribution	$373,554,033	1995	
7	A Bug's Life	U.S.	Walt Disney Pictures/Pixar Animation Studios	Buena Vista Pictures Distribution	$363,398,565	1998	
8	Pocahontas	U.S.	Walt Disney Pictures/Walt Disney Animation Studios	Buena Vista Pictures Distribution	$346,079,773	1995	
9	The Hunchback of Notre Dame	U.S.	Walt Disney Pictures/Walt Disney Animation Studios	Buena Vista Pictures Distribution	$325,338,851	1996	
10	Mulan	U.S.	Walt Disney Pictures/Walt Disney Animation Studios	Buena Vista Pictures Distribution	$304,320,254	1998	
11	Hercules	U.S.	Walt Disney Pictures/Walt Disney Animation Studios	Buena Vista Pictures Distribution	$252,712,101	1997	
12	The Prince of Egypt	U.S.	DreamWorks Animation	DreamWorks Pictures	$218,613,188	1998	
13	Antz	U.S.	DreamWorks Animation / PDI	DreamWorks Pictures	$171,757,863	1998	
14	Pokémon: The First Movie	Japan	OLM, Inc.	Toho	$163,644,662	1998	
15	Princess Mononoke	Japan	Studio Ghibli	Tokuma Shoten	$159,375,308	1997	
16	The Rugrats Movie	U.S.	Paramount Animation / Nickelodeon Movies / Klasky Csupo	Paramount Pictures	$140,894,675	1998	
17	Anastasia	U.S.	20th Century Fox Animation	20th Century Fox	$139,804,348	1997	
18	Pokémon: The Movie 2000	Japan	OLM, Inc.	Toho	$133,949,270	1999	
19	Fantasia 2000	U.S.	Walt Disney Pictures/Walt Disney Animation Studios	Buena Vista Pictures Distribution	$90,874,570	1999	
20	South Park: Bigger, Longer & Uncut	U.S.	Comedy Central Films / Scott Rudin Productions	Paramount Pictures	$83,137,603	1999	
21	The Nightmare Before Christmas	U.S.	Walt Disney Pictures/Skellington Productions	Buena Vista Pictures Distribution	$81,877,069	1993	
22	Beavis and Butt-head Do America	U.S.	Paramount Animation / MTV Films / Geffen Pictures	Paramount Pictures	$63,118,386	1996	
23	The Rescuers Down Under	U.S.	Walt Disney Pictures / Walt Disney Animation Studios	Buena Vista Pictures Distribution	$47,431,461	1990	
24	An American Tail: Fievel Goes West	U.S.	Amblimation / Amblin Entertainment	Universal Pictures	$40,766,041	1991	.
25	Quest for Camelot	U.S.	Warner Animation Group	Warner Bros. Pictures	$38,172,500	1998	
26	James and the Giant Peach	U.S. / U.K.	Walt Disney Pictures /Skellington Productions / Allied Filmmakers	Buena Vista Pictures Distribution / Guild Film Distribution	$37,700,000	1996	
27	A Goofy Movie	U.S.	Walt Disney Pictures / Disney Television Animation / Disneytoon Studios	Buena Vista Pictures Distribution	$37,600,000	1995	
28	Whisper of the Heart	Japan	Studio Ghibli	Tokuma Shoten	$34,900,000	1995	
29	Werner - That's Hot	Germany	TBD	Constantin Film	$34,100,000	1996	
30	Porco Rosso	Japan	Studio Ghibli	Tokuma Shoten	$34,000,000	1992	
31	FernGully: The Last Rainforest	U.S.	20th Century Fox Animation / FAI Films / Kroyer Films	20th Century Fox	$32,710,894	1992	
32	The Iron Giant	U.S.	Warner Animation Group	Warner Bros. Pictures	$31,333,917	1999	
33	Dragon Ball Z 8: The Legendary Super Saiyan	Japan	Toei Animation / Bird Studio	Toei Company	$30,400,000	1993	
34	Pom Poko	Japan	Studio Ghibli	Tokuma Shoten	$27,275,730	1994	.
35	Werner – Beinhart!	Germany	TBD	Constantin Film	$24,000,000	1990	
36	Dragon Ball Z 12: Fusion Reborn	Japan	Toei Animation / Bird Studio	Toei Company	$22,700,000	1995	
37	Dragon Ball Z 10: Broly – Second Coming	Japan	Toei Animation / Bird Studio	Toei Company	$22,200,000	1994	
37	Doraemon: Nobita's Great Adventure in the South Seas	Japan	Shin-Ei Animation / Asatsu / Fujiko Pro.	Toho Co., Ltd.	$21,010,000	1998	
39	Doraemon: Nobita and the Spiral City	Japan	Shin-Ei Animation / Asatsu / Fujiko Pro.	Toho Co., Ltd.	$21,000,000	1997	
40	Doraemon: Nobita Drifts in the Universe	Japan	Shin-Ei Animation / Asatsu / Fujiko Pro.	Toho Co., Ltd.	$20,900,000	1999	
41	My Neighbors the Yamadas	Japan	Studio Ghibli	Tokuma Shoten	$20,500,000	1999	
42	Jetsons: The Movie	U.S.	Hanna-Barbera Cartoons	Universal Pictures	$20,305,841	1990	
43	Digimon Adventure	Japan	Toei Animation	Toei Company / 20th Century Fox	$20,000,000	1999	
44	Doug's 1st Movie	U.S.	Walt Disney Pictures / Disney Television Animation / Jumbo Pictures	Buena Vista Pictures Distribution	$19,440,089	1999	
45	Dragon Ball Z 6: Return of Cooler	Japan	Toei Animation / Bird Studio	Toei Company	$19,200,000	1992	
46	Doraemon: Nobita and the Animal Planet	Japan	Shin-Ei Animation / Asatsu / Fujiko Pro.	Toho Co., Ltd.	$19,000,000	1990	
47	Dragon Ball Z: Super Android 13	Japan	Toei Animation / Bird Studio	Toei Company	$18,900,000	1992	
48	Only Yesterday	Japan	Studio Ghibli	Tokuma Shoten	$18,846,700	1991	
49	Dragon Ball Z 9: Bojack Unbound	Japan	Toei Animation / Bird Studio	Toei Company	$18,700,000	1999	
50	Street Fighter II: The Animated Movie	Japan	Capcom / Group TAC / SEDIC / Sony Music Entertainment	Toei Company	$16,000,000	1994	

=== Highest-grossing film by year ===
Year	Title	Worldwide gross	Budget	Ref.
1990	The Rescuers Down Under	$47,431,461	TBD	
1991	Beauty and the Beast	$424,967,620 ($351,863,363)	$25,000,000	
1992	Aladdin	$504,050,219	$28,000,000	
1993	The Nightmare Before Christmas	$81,877,069 ($50,003,043)^{*}	$18,000,000	
1994	The Lion King	$968,483,777 ($766,964,132)	$45,000,000–79,300,000	
1995	Toy Story	$373,554,033 ($361,958,736)	$30,000,000	
1996	The Hunchback of Notre Dame	$325,338,851	$100,000,000	
1997	Hercules	$252,712,101	$85,000,000	
1998	A Bug's Life	$363,258,859	$120,000,000	
1999	Toy Story 2	$497,366,869 ($485,015,179)	$90,000,000	

- ^{*}Canada and U.S. gross only

== See also ==
- List of highest-grossing animated films of the 1980s
- List of highest-grossing animated films of the 2000s
- List of highest-grossing animated films of the 2010s
