= Clones Film Festival =

Film festival in County Monaghan, Ireland

Coordinates: 54.183°N 7.2337°W

- Location: Clones, County Monaghan, Ireland
- Founded: 2001
- Festival date: late October
- Language: English, Irish and others
- Website: clonesfilmfestival.com

The Clones Film Festival is a film festival in Clones, Ireland. It was launched in 2001 and is steadily growing to be the biggest event of its type in the area. Organised by Lmb Entertainments,

One of the features of the Clones Film Festival is the Short Film Challenge. Filmmakers get the chance to script, prep, scout locations, cast, rehearse, film, edit and present a finished short film in just three days. The winning entry receives a coveted Francie Award, named after Francie Brady, protagonist of The Butcher Boy (1997), set and filmed in Clones.
