= Cartoons for Children's Rights =

Cartoons for Children's Rights is a collection of animated shorts based on UNICEF’s Convention on the Rights of the Child. In 1994, UNICEF held a summit encouraging animation studios around the world to create individual animated spots demonstrating the international rights of children.

== List of cartoons ==
- Children Have the Right to Protection from Work That Threatens Their Health, Education or Development: Italy, RAI Television, Created by Guido Manuli, Article 32
- Children Have the Right to Appropriate information: Finland, EPIDEM, Created by Antonia Ringbom, Article 17
- Children Have the Right to Express Themselves: USA, Nickelodeon, Directed by Byron Glaser and Sandra Higashi CGI, in association with Pixar and Zolo Inc., Article 13
- Children Have the Right to Protection In Times of War: USA, Matinee Entertainment, Directed by Frank Saperstein, Article 38
- Children Have the Right to Protection from Trafficking and Abduction: Denmark, A. Film A/S, Directed by Jørgen Lerdam, Article 35
- Children Have the Right to Know and Live Their Own Culture: Australia, Aboriginal Nations Ltd., Animated by Shane Russell, Article 30
- Children Have the Right to Protection from Neglect: Taiwan, Wang Film Productions, Directed by Robin Wang, Created by Pongo Kero and Fish Wang, Article 19
- Children Have the Right to Play, USA, Sunbow Entertainment, Created by Ben Edlund and Christopher McCulloch, Article 31
- Children Have the Right to Protection from Landmines: Canada, Cinar Films, Created by Greg Bailey, Article 38
- Children Have the Right to Protection from Sexual Abuse: Germany, Hahn Films, Directed by Claudia Collier, Article 34
- Children Have the Right to Express Themselves: USA, HBO Animation, Created by Eileen O'Meara, Produced by Catherine Winder, Music by John McCarthy, Article 12
- Children Have the Right to Survive and Develop to the Fullest: Canada, National Film Board of Canada, Created by Bretislav Pojar, Article 6
- Children Have the Right to a Home: Spain, Neptuno Films, Directed by Josep Lluise Viciana, Article 27
- Children Have the Right to Privacy: Poland, Polish Television, Directed by Aleksandra Korejwo, Article 16
- Children Have the Right to a Loving and Caring Family: USA, Columbia Tri-Star Children's Programming, Directed by Bill Dennis and John Rice, Article 20
- Children Have the Right to Protection in Times of War: Philippines, Fil-Cartoons Inc., Directed by Bill Dennis and John Rice, Article 38
- Children Have the Right to Express Their Opinions: USA, Disney Institute, Directed by Lock Wolverton, Article 14
- Children Have the Right to Meet and Share Views with Others: Canada, Bardel Animation Ltd., Created by Tom Heimann, Article 15
- Children Have the Right to a Drug-Free World: USA, Animagination, DIC Entertainment, Created by Art Mawhinney, Article 33
- Children Have the Right to Protection from Guns: USA, Fred Wolf Films, Created by Kyle Menke, Article 19
- Children Have the Right to Express Their Opinions: USA, Children's Television Workshop, Created by Semofar Animation Studio (Lodz, Poland), Article 14
- Children Have the Right to Protection in Times of War: USA, Michael Sporn Productions, Created by Michael Sporn, Article 39
- Children Have the Right to Freedom of Thought: USA, MTV Animation, Created by Machi Tantillo, Music by Sweet Honey in the Rock, Article 14
- Children Have the Right to Appropriate Information: USA, Urban Design Inc., Directed by John Serpentelli, Article 13
- Children Have the Right to Protection from Trafficking and Abduction: Spain, BRB Internacional, Directed by Claudio Biern Boyd, Articles 11 and 35
- Refugee Children Have the Right to Protection: Finland, YLE 2, Animated by Pauli Rinkinen, Article 22
- Children Have the Right to A Healthy Environment: USA, Art and Animation Station, Directed by John Serpentelli, Article 24
- Children Have the Right to Enjoy Their Own Culture: Bolivia, Nicobis, Directed by Alfredo Ovando, Animated by Mauricio Murillo, Article 30
- Children Have the Right to Protection from Hazardous Work: USA, Warner Bros. Feature Animation, Directed by Mohamed Mohamed, Produced by Zahra Dowlatabadi, Article 32
- Every Child Has the Right to A Family: Argentina, Independent, Created by Miguel Repiso, Article 5
- Every Child Has the Right to Education: Brazil, TV Futura, Directed by Caco Galhardo, Animated by Quinho, Article 28
- Children Have the Right to Protection in War: India, USL-RM, Article 38
- Children Have the Right to Access Special Education: Indonesia, Red Rocket Animation, Created by Poppy Palele, Article 23
- Children In Conflict with the Law have the Right to be Treated with Dignity: Mexico, Kimerica Clisos, Animated by Mario Rosales, Anabel Prado and Jorge Mendoza, Articles 37 and 40
- Every Child Has the Right to A Name and Nationality: Venezuela, ArteVision-USB, Animated by Alexandra Crippa, Nelson Venecia and Reinaldo Cayama, Music by Francisco Diaz, Article 7
- Every Child Has the Right to Freedom of Conscience: USA, Walt Disney Feature Animation, Created by Hendel Butoy, Music by Pixote, Article 14
- Every Child Has the Right to Food and Nutrition: United Kingdom, Telemagination, Animated by Elphin Lloyd-Jones, Article 24
- Children Have the Right to Protection from Neglect: Canada, Cheeky Monkey, Animated by Kathi and Lee Atkinson, Article 19
- Children Have the Right to Express Themselves: Chile, Cine Animadores, Animated by Alejandro Rojas Tellez. Sound and Music by Alejandro Lyon, Article 13
- Children Have the Right to Attention from Both Parents: Armenia, Yantz Films, Animated by Robert Sahakyants, Article 18
- Every Child Has the Right Not to be Exploited: Mexico, Independent, Animated by Luiz Tellez, Articles 32 and 36
- Children Have the Right to Adequate Health Services: Argentina, Independent, Created by Miguel Repiso, Article 24
- Children Have the Right to Special Care and Assistance: Iraq, LNA Bureau for Digital Arts, Animated by Laith Al-Jassani, Article 23
- Children Have The Right to Understand with Education: Malaysia, Radio Televisyen Malaysia (RTM), Animated by Hassan Abd. Muthalib, Article 35
- Protect Children From Labour which Interferes with their Education: Nepal, Independent, Animated by Nirmal Serchan, Article 32
- Children Have the Right to Knowledge on the Natural Environment: Spain, D'Ocon Films, Article 29
- Every Child Has the Right to Healthcare and Education: Cuba, ICAIC, Animated by Miguel Vial, Articles 24 and 28
- Children Have the Right to Develop to Their Full Potential: USA, Summer Productions, Article 6
- Children Have the Right to Protection from Abuse: Jamaica, Independent, Produced at UNICEF Animation Workshop, Music by Charles Lewis, Article 19
- Every Child Has the Right to An Identity: Iran, Independent, Animated by Noureddin Zarrinkelk, Article 8
- Children Have the Right to Culturally Sensitive Education: Peru, Independent, Created by Juan Acevedo and Pepe San Martin, Article 29
- Children Have the Right to Survive: Italy, Mondo TV, Article 6
- Children Have the Right to Access Education: Syria, Independent, Animated by Muafak Kat, Article 28
- Exercising the Right to Protection breaks the Cycle of Abuse: USA, Teaching Institution, Animated by the New York School of Visual Arts, Article 19
- Every Child Has the Right to A Name and Nationality: USA, AnimAction, Directed by Frank Gladstone, Music by STRATTON, Article 7
- Every Child Has the Right to Protection in War: Senegal, Pictoon, Animated by Pierre Sauvalle, Article 38
- All Children Have the Right to Participate: Bolivia, Nicobis, Directed by Alfredo Ovando, Animation by Mauricio Murillo, Article 2
- Every Child Has the Right to Freedom from Abuse: Mexico, Movim, Animated by Dominique Jonard, Article 19
- Every Child the Right to Quality Education: Mexico, Independent, Animated by Julio Rojas, Article 28
- Every Child Has the Right to a Caring Family: Puerto Rico, Animacion Boricua Inc., Animated by Paco Lopez, Article 5
- Children Have the Right to Special Care and Assistance: Belgium, Les Delires Productions, Animated by Valere Lommel and Joke Van Der Steen, Music by Jano Buchem, Article 23
- Rights Should Be Applied in the Best Interests of the Child: United Kingdom, Red Kite Productions Ltd., Animation by Anwyn Beier, Music by Rowland Lee, Articles 3 and 9
- All Rights to a Childhood Need Protection: Mexico, Ramm Productions, Animated by Rafael Andreu, Music by Aneiro Taño, Article 1
- Every Child Has the Right to a Loving Family: Chile, Cine Animadores, Animated by Alejandro Rojas Tellez, Sound and Music by Alejandro Lyon, Article 5
- Every Child Has the Right to a Life Free From Discrimination: Barbados, Independent, Animated by Guy 'O Neal, Article 2
- Every Child has the Right to Appropriate Information: USA, AnimAction, Article 17
- Children Have the Right to Express Themselves: Italy, Independent, Animated by Andrea Princivalli, Article 12
- Children Have to Right to Protection from Dangerous Labor: India, Toonz Animation, Directed by Bill Dennis, Article 32
- Children Have the Right to Their Own Identity: United Kingdom, Independent, Animated by Sharon E. Smith, Music by Rowland Lee and Alex Russell, Article 8
- Every Child Has the Right to Protection from Neglect: Czech Republic, Kratky Film Praha A.S., Animated by Zdeňka Deitchová, Article 19
- Children Have the Right to Freedom of Thought: China, Santoon Productions Inc., Animated by San Wei Chan, Article 14
- Every Child Has the Right to Adequate Nutrition and Healthcare: USA, Independent, Animated by Susana Maria Halpine, Article 24
- Every Child Has the Right to An Identity: Myanmar, Forever Group, Article 8
- Children Have the Right to Quality Education: Lebanon, Independent, Animated by Lina Ghaibeh, Article 28
- Children Have to Right to Appropriate Information: United Kingdom, Promax, Animated by Alexandra Ohlenforst, Article 17
- Children Have the Right to Protection from Mental Violence: Yugoslavia, Saf Vranje Yugosalvia, Article 19
- Children Have the Right to Play: Myanmar, Forever Group, Article 31
