= Glassy Ocean =

Short animated film by Shigeru Tamura

- Directed by: Shigeru Tamura
- Written by: Shigeru Tamura
- Produced by: Mitsuo Shionaga
- Edited by: Yukihiro Ishikawa
- Music by: Utollo Teshikai
- Production companies: Project Team Sarah (Animation); Ai ga areba Daijobu; Bandai Visual
- Release date: November 14, 1998
- Running time: 22 minutes
- Country: Japan
- Language: Japanese

Glassy Ocean (Japanese: クジラの跳躍, Hepburn: Kujira no chōyaku; lit. 'A Whale's Leap') is a 1998 Japanese animated film directed by Shigeru Tamura. This is Tamura's second animated work following his 1993 short film Ursa Minor Blue (Japanese: 銀河の魚). The film was produced by the studios Project Team Sarah (for the animation), Ai ga areba Daijobu, and Bandai Visual

== Synopsis ==
Time has come to a standstill. A whale appears from a glassy ocean and spends half a day soaring across the skies. The ocean remains in a frozen state as the individuals who inhabit this land casually wander over it.

== Creators ==
Cast
Role	Name
Eric Jacobsen	Ocean Floor Man
Hiroyuki Aoki	Alcoholic Philosopher
Ichirō Nagai	Old Man
Kento Ogasawara	Boy
Masaharu Satō	Human Building (voice)
Masatoshi Nagase	Narrator
Masayuki Terashima	Spear Man
Noboru Mitani	Artist R
Shinichi Tsuda	Lime Student
Takeshi Toshishige	Dreaming Man

Crew
Role	Name
Director	Shigeru Tamura
Writer	Shigeru Tamura
Illustrator	Shigeru Tamura
Producer	Mitsuo Shionaga
Producer (Animation)	Akemi Ueda
Animation	Rie Oshima Kyoko Kashiwagi Etsuko Tomita
3D Visual Direction	Shinya Kato
Editor	Yukihiro Ishikawa
Sound Design	Kazutaka Someya
Composer	Utollo Teshikai Hiroshi Ogasawara

== Awards ==
1998 - Japan Media Arts Festival grand prize for animation

== Reception ==
The Encyclopedia of Science Fiction described Glassy Ocean as an unusual and surreal animated film, highlighting its dreamlike treatment of time and reality, particularly its depiction of an ocean that appears solid as glass to inhabitants experiencing time at a different rate. It praised Shigeru Tamura's simple visual style for producing charming backgrounds, although it considered the character designs less successful than those in his earlier films, Blue Little Bear Ursa Minor Blue (1993) and A Piece of Phantasmagoria (1995). The encyclopedia also noted the film's influence on Cat Soup (2001), particularly through its music by Teshikai Utollo.
