= Kebabaluba =

- Directed by: Enis Tahsin Özgür
- Starring: Cemil Şinasi Türün (voice)
- Edited by: E. Tahsin Ozgür, Jodie Steinvorth
- Release date: 1995
- Running time: 2 minutes 11 seconds
- Country: Turkey
- Language: English

Kebabaluba is a 1995 Turkish animated short film directed by Enis Tahsin Özgür. The film was an official selection of the 1995 Annecy International Animated Film Festival.

== Plot ==
Hamdi is a simple doner kebab salesman, but he is very proud of his job.
