= Patrick Dowling (producer) =

Patrick Dowling (19 August 1919 – 17 June 2009) was an English television producer. He was best known for producing a number of successful series for the BBC including The Adventure Game, Vision On and Why Don't You?.

== Early life ==
Born in Southwest London, Dowling undertook his national service with the Royal Air Force, having his career extended at the start of World War II. After being demobbed, he married the actress Jane Gregson.

In 1946, Dowling was taken on as stage manager and electrician with the Guildford and then the Amersham repertory companies. From 1951 to 1952 he was stage director at the Oxford Playhouse.

== BBC career ==
In 1955 Dowling joined the BBC as a runner, later becoming a production assistant on various series including Girl at the Window, The Black Brigand, The Railway Children, Thompson Family, Secret Garden, Great Expectations, Adventures of Tom Sawyer, The Treasure Seekers and The Balloon and the Baron for which Dowling also composed the music.

Dowling then moved into production, working with others on Victory, Idiots Delight, Makepeace Story, Invisible Armies, Hole in the Wall, Pocket Lancer, Last Man Out, and Just William. He then directed Cabin in the Clearing.

From the late 1950s Dowling undertook training at the Television Training Centre. This was followed by attachments across various departments, including BBC Sport, Light Entertainment and finally Further Education, where he produced the first series of the programme Working With Computers.

=== Vision On ===
In 1959, Dowling directed a monthly series for deaf children for producer Ursula Eason, called For Deaf Children. This was paced slowly enough for children to read captions and subtitles, but it had been noted in surveys that a favourite programme for deaf children was Top of the Pops, due to its lively and fast-moving format and the fact that even the profoundly deaf could still enjoy the music's lower frequency notes. Dowling and Eason took the concept and turned it in 1964 into Vision On, front by mime actress Pat Keysell (Eason's former PA) and artist Tony Hart. The aim of the programme was to entertain but also to encourage imagination, with a fast-paced flow of contrasting ideas, both sane and silly. The series ran for twelve years and, while retaining a commitment to the deaf, attracted a wider following. It gained several awards including the international Prix Jeunesse and the BAFTA Award for Specialised Programmes.

=== Children's programmes ===
During the production run of Vision On, Dowling had also produced other series for BBC Children's Television, including Price to Play, I want to be a Pilot and Code in the Head. Dowling eventually found that the flow of new ideas became more and more difficult to sustain, and after twelve years decided to close Vision On while it was still at its height.

Dowling moved on to continue working with Tony Hart to make arts programmes, starting with Take Hart (which kept Vision On's "The Gallery" segment), continuing the partnership later with Hartbeat during the 1980s and 1990s, and then the BBC's more recent children's art programme, SMart.

Dowling also produced Why Don’t You Just Switch Off Your Television Set and Go and Do Something Less Boring Instead?, which the Radio Times cut down to Why Don’t You …?. He then created The Adventure Game (1980-1986), and wrote and produced the first two series.

From his independent production company, he wrote and produced 26 5-minute episodes of The Amazing Adventures of Morph.

== Retirement ==
Dowling decided to emigrate to Australia in 1983, where he was a member of the Bush Fire Brigade for 21 years. In 2004 he moved to Hunters Hill just outside Sydney, New South Wales, where he took up tai chi.

In 1954 he had become the founding secretary of the BBC Yacht Club. He spent his weekends and holidays sailing around France, developing his fluent French during the winter. Dowling gained the Board of Trade 'Yachtmaster Coastal' qualification, and became an examiner for the Royal Yachting Association.

Dowling died after a brief illness in Sydney on 17 June 2009, aged 89.
