= Deaf theatre =

Theater by, for or about deaf people

Deaf theatre is an alternative form of theatre which is a collaboration of deaf actors or actresses. Using open space, the performers use gesture, dance, and sign language to perform to an audience. Production teams create theatre in their respective signed languages and many companies choose to have both hearing performers and deaf performers for a dual-language experience while some offer solely signed performances.

== Notable companies and history ==
=== United States ===
In 1967 the first Deaf theatre in the US was the National Theatre for the Deaf. The group was founded after a 1959 Broadway production of The Miracle Worker, which is about Helen Keller and her teacher, Anne Sullivan. The lighting designer and lead actress in this performance chose to pursue how ASL could be used in art. The company was officially founded in 1967, along with a drama school. The following year they founded Little Theatre of the Deaf, for deaf children. Currently, there is no more federal funding for the theatre company, so they focus most of their efforts on the children's group.

In 1977 Minnesota Theater Institute of the Deaf (MTID) was founded. Along with its regular lineup of plays it also had a Little/Jr theater where the children appeared in shows. It had a strong outreach program and offered theater classes. It continued until 1980.

In 1979, The New York Deaf Theatre was founded by Deaf artists who wanted performances in ASL within New York City.

In 1980 Northern Sign Theater was founded after Minnesota Theater Institute of the Deaf folded and continued for some years until it lost its funding.

In 1991 Deaf West was founded, it is best known for Spring Awakening and Big River, both of which went to Broadway. All productions will feature hearing actors and deaf actors, oftentimes with 2 people cast in a single role to weave the two languages together.

=== Russia ===
In 1919, various deaf actors came together to form a club of performance. Five years later, the club received a space to rehearse and perform that could seat 300 people. Around this time, the club began doing works of Anton Chekhov and other playwrights. It toured throughout the 1930s as "The Moscow Theatre of the Deaf". Its existence after WWII remains unknown.

In 1957, the Russian government helped to fund various post-war investments, one of which was deaf cultural engagement. With this, a theatre studio was founded for the deaf. It became known as the Theater of Mimicry and Gesture, a name it still holds to this day. By the mid-60s, actors started to receive professional training within the studio.

In 2003, a newer theatre known as Nedoslov Theatre was formed. This theatre has only deaf and hard-of-hearing members and has toured internationally to various festivals.

=== United Kingdom ===
In the second half of the 19th century, various groups performed Shakespearean plays entirely in British Sign Language (BSL). This began in Manchester in 1865 with a production of Henry IV. Later, a different group performed Hamlet in 1886 and drew an audience of around 600 people.

Pat Keysell trained in mime in university. In 1960, she and Ursula Eason set up the Royal National Institute for the Deaf (RNID) Mime Group, which gave Deaf actors opportunities to perform in gestural productions. By 1969, this transformed in the British Theatre for the Deaf. This company existed throughout the 70s, but has since dissolved. They were known for their summer school programs that gave Deaf youth a performance-based community.

In 2001 the company Signdance Collective was founded from the roots of the Signdance Theatre of 1987. The company has touring productions and aims to establish both deaf and disabled artists.

In 2002 Deafinitely Theatre a modern company that uses a bilingual method of performance with both spoken English and BSL. They were founded by Paula Garfield, who was frustrated with a lack of accessible theatre. The company produces theatre for all ages and has even produced in Shakespeare's Globe Theatre.

=== Finland ===
Founded in 1987, Teatteri Totti was the only Deaf theatre in the country. It originally operated under a different organization but moved to be operated independently in 2015. In 2006, Teatteri Totti started to receive financial support from the state.

Most productions are performed in Finnish Sign Language, with occasional productions in Swedish Sign Language, two languages which share an origin. The company premiered the world's first signed opera in 2008 which featured actors producing in exaggerated signs to replicate opera singers exaggerated tableaus.

The company has established relationships with the Finnish National Theatre. Along with 4 other companies, Teatteri Totti participated in an international project for the deaf performing arts in 2020.

=== Norway ===
The Norwegian Association for the Deaf began hosting annual culture days in 1967, which featured signed performances. Mira Zuckerman was an actress during this era and became the first professional Deaf actress in the country. In 1997, a study commenced about signing theatre, which led to the first Deaf theatre in the country.

Teater Manu began in 1999 because a high school and Deaf center wanted to establish a professional sign language theatre. After 2 years of trial performances, the organization received state funding and was officially stationed in the capital of Oslo.

Their website lauds themselves for high quality performances and monolingual translated performances of classic texts. The theatre has been collaborating with the National Swedish Touring Theatre since its early years.

=== France ===
The International Visual Theatre was founded in 1977 and has been operating ever since. It was founded by a Deaf American and a French director who was already interested in non-verbal performance. Their company follows a bilingual model of using both French Sign Language (LSF) and French for around half of their shows, with the other half being without any spoken language.

The first European Theatre school to have a sign language specific program was École de Théâtre Universelle. It is a 2-year long track founded in 2013 by Deaf performers.

=== Netherlands ===
In 1979, the Visual Theatre Foundation gave Deaf people opportunities in smaller projects. Around this same time, people abroad started to notice the US's National Theatre for the Deaf. In 1983, a course for the Deaf to become theatre teachers arose. Couprie became the first such graduate in 1988. After an international conference surrounding deafness and culture thereof, the theatre was officially founded by Couprie, Emmerick, and others.

In 1990 Handtheater was a company that formed, they exclusively performed bilingually in Dutch Sign Language and Dutch. In the 1970s, two Deaf performers began creating live performances mostly in mime. The two performers, Wim Emmerick and Jean Couprie desired work in Dutch Sign Language but it was not widely known enough still.

In 1996, the company was able to own its own space to rehearse and perform in. They began having financial struggles on and off, losing their original building and having to relocate in the early 2000s. By 2015, their office was moved back to a smaller location, and after being rejected a request for more money, they announced their closure at their 25th anniversary.

=== Sweden ===
In 1970, Tyst Teater was founded as the first Deaf Theatre in Sweden. Beginning in 1977, they have been a subset of an existing company known as the National Swedish Touring Theatre.

The translation of Tyst Teater means "silent theatre". In 2020 it was changed to Riksteatern Crea. In 2008, the company added a youth component for young Deaf people to practice the arts.

The company states that for hearing and non-signing audiences "dramatic art [is made] accessible by subtitling performances, providing voice interpretation or other innovative solutions."

=== Australia ===
In 1973, Nick Neary worked with a Deaf society to open up an amateur theatre at a stage. It became the New South Wales Theatre of the Deaf (NSW TOD), also known as the Deaf Drama Club. In 1978, after technical- and educational-theatre training in the company, they became a professional company.

The group started recruiting professional actors to become just the Theatre of the Deaf, with the NSW TOD still operating separately until 1982.

In 1995, it became the Australian Theatre of the Deaf and operated as such for 15 years with nationally touring productions and theatre in education workshops. Beginning in 2011, they started working with Arts Access Victoria. And in 2018, the ATOD ended, though they are still active on social media, promoting Deaf acting and theatrical opportunities.

The Queensland Theatre of the Deaf opened in 1975 and closed unexpectedly in 2005. During the period between 1970 and 2000, other theatre companies existed for periods of 2–30 years, such as Victoria Theatre of the Deaf and the Gestures Theatre of the Deaf.

Deafferent Theatre was founded in 2016 and is still operating today.

=== Other companies ===
Na Laga’at is a company in Israel for Deaf, blind, and Deafblind performers.

== Challenges ==
Theatre is made up primarily of movement, music, and acting. Movement pieces and dance numbers can tell a story on their own but are often assisted through song and soundscapes. Acting is often oral, with the help of facial expressions. And in musical theatre, stories are told through singing, a medium often inaccessible to the deaf. Because of the oral-based methods of producing theatre, it is typically inaccessible to deaf audiences.
