= Night Shift (British TV series) =

Night Shift is a British television series that portrayed people who work the night shift (work during the night).

Night Shift titles

Night Shift was made by a small independent production company called Addictive TV for the ITV network in the United Kingdom. Each episode of Night Shift lasted only five to ten minutes. The show's original run was from 1993 to 1994, while an additional series was produced in 1998. Several of Night Shift's episodes were filmed at the same location, most notably Gatwick Airport and Victoria Station.

The original series featured a model shot, in which a camera moves across a Monopoly-style map of a city into the title, Night Shift, written as a street name. The shot was produced for a pilot in mid-1992, but utilized in the final shows too. The model was constructed by model-maker Peter Poole, and filmed by Dave Hicks. Despite the look, there was no film studio involved: just a Brighton garage. A mini-mist smoke machine was used to add depth to the backlit model, which was about 6 by 4 feet in size. A photo appeared in the design magazine, Creative Review, in the What's New In Design? section.

The show, filmed entirely hand-held in a style uncommon at the time, was presented in an informal fashion by the writer and actor, Colin Bennett. Bennett is also known for his appearance on the BBC children's television show, Take Hart, which was presented by Tony Hart.

The short episodes would generally show up at a moment's notice if programmes ran early or it was needed to fill in a small gap. In the latter part of scheduling sometimes two episodes or more would be shown back to back. Colin always appeared sporting an Edmonton Oilers jacket and only removed it once during the entire run. The production crew were often spoken to by the presenter, with reference to "Nick" and "Graham". These names refer to producer/sound recordist Nick Clarke and producer/director Graham Daniels of Addictive TV. The crew sometimes appeared on camera with one episode at Gatwick Airport, weighing baggage. The series was shot by award-winning cameraman Nic Small.

Examples of the shows include a late night visit to a cab firm who were not very busy at all and Colin learnt that most of their time was spent playing cards. Escort agencies, hospitals, lap dancing bars, police stations and even nuclear power plants were frequented by the team. An individual episode was filmed entirely using a nightvision camera out in the dark with the army giving it an eerie green glow. The series was also the first ever television programme allowed to film in Gatwick Airport's control tower (before the BBC series Airport).
