= Pat Keysell =

British actress and TV presenter (1926–2009)

- Born: Patricia June Keysell; 7 June 1926; Tooting, London, England
- Died: 31 October 2009 (aged 83); Italy
- Education: Royal Central School of Speech and Drama
- Occupations: Television presenter, actress, campaigner

Pat Keysell (7 June 1926 – 31 October 2009) was a presenter of the BBC television series Vision On which ran from 1964 to 1976. She was also a mime artist and administrator.

== Early life ==
Keysell was born in Tooting, London and brought up in Petts Wood, Kent. She was educated in Orpington and trained in mime at the Central School of Speech and Drama. She later emigrated, returning to Britain in 1958 with her son, after having divorced her husband.

== Career ==
Keysell worked as a personal assistant to Ursula Eason (1910–93) who was the Assistant Head of BBC Children's Television from 1955 to 1970. She made her debut with For Deaf Children in the late 1950s by introducing mime to the format, acted out by deaf actors. By the time of Vision On she was a production assistant with the BBC's Drama Department and went freelance in order to present the new programme. Keysell was involved in Vision On at a very early stage when the series began in 1964, being the presenter and assistant to Tony Hart. Many of her ideas were included in the very early shows which were then broadcast fortnightly. It was Keysell who delivered the catch phrase "I'm sorry we can't return any of your pictures but we give a small prize for those that we do show" after the programme's 'Gallery' feature.

Her main contribution to BBC television was that she helped to bridge the gap between hearing and non-hearing viewers. She did this by addressing the television camera and using sign language as she spoke.

Keysell was a mime teacher for the Royal National Institute for the Deaf (RNID) and in 1968 was awarded a Winston Churchill Fellowship to study with the National Theatre of the Deaf in the USA. On her return she set up a company also named the National Theatre of the Deaf. The American company threatened to sue and the name was promptly changed to British Theatre of the Deaf which became a professional touring company in 1974 and was the forerunner of later projects developed by other deaf people particularly Terry Ruane who was general manager. It is arguable that other opportunities for deaf actors like the course at Reading University developed from Keysell's earlier work.

After Vision On ended in 1976, she wrote and produced two series of the storytelling programme Under the Same Sun (1978–79) for Yorkshire Television. The title originated from a theatre show she had recently done with the British Theatre of the Deaf, Under the Sun, and followed the same format, using the same stories.

In 1992 Keysell wrote a mime workshop book called Mime Over Matter. She then worked at the Brewery Arts Centre in Cumbria and on other projects before settling in Eastbourne, Sussex from 1996. Keysell and Tony Hart were reunited over lunch shortly before Hart's death, not having seen each other since the Vision On series had finished.

After touring her own Compass Storytelling shows for many years, Keysell studied storytelling as a healing art at Emerson College and Mindfields College, subsequently developing her work in day centres, Crowborough Hospital, working with the elderly, adults and children with a learning disability, the Sussex Association for the Blind, Shinewater Court (people with severe physical disabilities) and in the hearing impaired unit in Willingdon School.

Until May 2006, Keysell was artistic director of Compass Community Arts, a registered charitable arts organisation working with all branches of the community based in her home town of Eastbourne. She was featured on the BBC community programme See Hear on 1 April 2009, where she talked about her career in television and education. She retired and went to live in Italy, where she died aged 83, survived by her son Michael.
