= Colin Bennett (actor) =

English actor (1944–2024)

Colin Jack Bennett (25 February 1944 – 23 February 2024) was an English actor. His television roles have included "Mr Bennett", the accident prone caretaker for Tony Hart in the BBC children's programmes Take Hart (1977–1983) and Hartbeat (1984–1989). He also portrayed the father in the 1985 Yellow Pages/Hornby advert Signal Box – although only in a later edit in which he thanked the son for his present.

Among other television duties, he presented Night Shift and You Should Be So Lucky, as well as appearing in The Hitchhiker's Guide to the Galaxy as Zarquon. He also made a guest appearance in Last of the Summer Wine in 1999. He wrote a couple of TV series including Captain Zep – Space Detective and Luna before moving into the production field. He has a background in acting in and directing plays notably in 1978 appearing in, and directing, a musical version of The Point! alongside Davy Jones and Mickey Dolenz. Bennett later worked with Dolenz on Luna.

In 1987, Bennett's play, Hancock's Finest Hour about Tony Hancock (with Jim McManus in the starring role) was staged at the Boulevard Theatre in London. The play was revived in 2008 with Paul Henry in the title role.

== Biography ==
Bennett graduated RADA in 1973 where he was named most promising actor of the year. Bennett ran a production company, An Acquired Taste TV Corp, and broadcast for television for about 17 years. He retired from acting in 2002, reportedly suffering from ill health, but later resumed acting.

In March 2024, Bennett's son Tom Bennett announced on X that his father had died two weeks previously, on 23 February.
