= Vision On =

British television program for deaf children

- Programme logo
- Created by: Ursula Eason and Patrick Dowling
- Developed by: Ursula Eason and Patrick Dowling
- Directed by: Patrick Dowling, Gerald Wiltshire, Diana Potter, Michael Grafton-Robinson, Peter Wiltshire, Clive Doig
- Presented by: Pat Keysell and Tony Hart
- Starring: David Cleveland, Ben Benison, Wilf Lunn, Sylvester McCoy
- Opening theme: "Accroche-Toi, Caroline" by Caravelli
- Ending theme: "Java" by Al Hirt and Bert Kaempfert
- Country of origin: United Kingdom
- Original languages: English and British Sign Language
- No. of seasons: 15
- No. of episodes: 168

Production
- Producer: Patrick Dowling
- Production companies: BBC, BBC Bristol

Original release
- Network: BBC 1
- Release: 6 March 1964 – 11 May 1976

Related
- For Deaf Children; Take Hart; Hartbeat

Vision On is a British children's television programme, shown on BBC1 from 1964 to 1976 and designed specifically for children with hearing impairment.

== Concept and production ==
Vision On was conceived and developed by BBC producers Ursula Eason and Patrick Dowling to replace a monthly series For Deaf Children (1952–64), a programme paced slowly enough for children to read captions and subtitles. It was noted in surveys that a favourite for deaf children was Top of the Pops, due to its lively and fast-moving format and that even the profoundly deaf could still enjoy the music's lower frequency notes.

There was initial disagreement as to whether lip-reading or British Sign Language would be more appropriate. Eventually it was decided that, since the new programme was intended as entertainment rather than education, communication would be entirely visual, the amount of text would be severely limited and, except for a few repeated statements, speech would be abandoned altogether. The title Vision On referred to the illuminated sign in studios indicating that cameras were live. Normally another sign "Sound On" would follow, but the titles for Vision On deliberately omitted this. The programme's logo is made up from the handwritten words of the title and their reflection, stylised into an animated character.

The aim of the programme was to entertain but also to encourage imagination, with a fast-paced flow of contrasting ideas, both sane and silly. This mixture was an apparent success as the series ran for twelve years and, while retaining a commitment to the deaf, attracted a wider following and gained several awards including the international Prix Jeunesse and the BAFTA Award for Specialised Series (Patrick Dowling 1974).

== Presenters ==
A full list of contributors can be found, but the main presenters were:

- Pat Keysell: an actress who also taught deaf children
- Tony Hart: artist, who made pictures in a variety of sizes and media, and encouraged children to submit their own paintings to "The Gallery", which they did by the thousands
- Ben Benison and Sylvester McCoy (credited as Sylveste McCoy): mime artistes
- Wilf Lunn: eccentric inventor of equally eccentric machines
- David Cleveland: appeared in film sequences as the Prof

== Segments ==
Besides the scenes with Hart, Keysell and the others doing artwork (which in later years appeared on the screen as the artwork being made without any hands), Vision On had many memorable segments:

- "The Gallery" – A section consisting of artwork sent into the show by viewers, with the name and age of the artist being shown alongside the artwork. Often the artwork shown on a specific show coincided with the theme of the show. At the end of this segment, Keysell would thank everyone for sending in their pictures and apologize for being unable to return them, but did state there was "a prize for any that we show". However, it remains unknown as to what exactly the prize was.
- "The Burbles" – A couple of unseen people living inside a grandfather clock who converse in speech bubbles, mainly telling puns. Occasionally they are heard speaking the lines as if they are underwater, but other times there are just the speech bubbles. In the French version (Déclic), the characters are called Coin-Coin.
- "The Prof" – A man in a white lab coat (aka film-makers David Cleveland, Tony Amies and David Wyatt) who is usually outdoors doing various humorous things.
- "Humphrey the Tortoise" – Much like the Burbles, Humphrey talks of something specific (usually a pun or joke) either to himself or someone else. His speech, as well as the other person's if there is one, is shown on screen with no audio.
- "The Digger" – A "cut-out" cartoon man created and animated by Bill Mather. Other Animators were Bob Baker, and Laurie Booth. Each week on a construction site he digs into the dirt with a shovel until something interesting is dug up.
- "The Animated Clock" – An animated cuckoo clock that is either showing signs of trouble or whose parts come to life like a human being, sometimes it would also feature a small animated man wandering around a surreal animated world and would interact with the clock's bird.
- "The Woofumpuss" – One running gag in later episodes involved one of the cast members frantically chasing a fuzzy worm trying to catch it to no avail and occasionally messing up the artwork of Hart and Keysell.
- "Aardman" - Various Clay animated segments created by Peter Lord and David Sproxton, including the Greeblies, who served as early precursors of their later creation, Morph, and Aard-man, a superhero whose name would later become the name of Lord and Sproxton's company, Aardman Animations.
- "Dinosaur" - Black & white animated segments featuring a young dinosaur. Created by Arril Johnson. The final episode of Vision On ended with the Dinosaur on a hill, watching a full-colour sunset.

== Music ==
Despite its intended hearing-impaired audience, the show made extensive use of music for the benefit of hearing viewers watching the show. Notable themes included:

- The opening theme was "Accroche-Toi, Caroline" by Caravelli (recorded by the Paris Studio Group).
- The closing theme was "Java" in the versions recorded by Al Hirt and Bert Kaempfert.
- "The Gallery" – "Left Bank Two" by Wayne Hill (recorded by The Noveltones) for De Wolfe Music is best remembered for this sequence. When Take Hart started, "Left Bank Two" became the opening theme tune and "Cavatina" became the "Gallery" music for the show instead.
- "The Burbles" theme "Goofy" by Cliff Johns.
- "Humphrey the tortoise" theme was Merry Ocarina by French composer Pierre Arvay (1924-1980).
- "Animated Clock" scenes used "Gurney Slade" by Max Harris (the theme music from the TV series The Strange World of Gurney Slade) and "Keystone Capers" by Eric Peters.
- "The Digger" music was "Elephant Dance" by Harry Pitch.
- "The Prof" – the two most commonly used themes were "Comedy Cocktails 2" and "Comedy Cocktails 4" by Paul Gerard, from the Chappell recorded music library.
- "Interlude" music was "Rampage" by Mike Vickers from the KPM music library.
- Picture montages were often accompanied by "Drumdramatics No.13" by Robert Farnon, from the Chappell Music library.

== Co-productions ==
Vision On was co-produced in France with ORTF, in Canada with Radio-Canada under the title Déclic and in Sweden as Ögon Blik. It was also shown in Israel under the title "קסים קסם" (Magic Magic).

== Distribution ==
The programme was shown in many other countries, including Australia, Belgium, Canada, France, Germany, Ireland, Israel, Jordan, Mexico, New Zealand, South Africa, Sweden & Switzerland.

In the United States, many PBS stations, and a few commercial stations, aired Vision On during the 1970s and 1980s. Some of these stations, such as KOMO-TV in Seattle, taped their own episodes, which were seen along with the BBC-produced shows.

== End of production ==
Series' producer Dowling eventually found that the flow of new ideas became more and more difficult to sustain, and after twelve years decided to close the programme while it was still at its height.

Dowling and Hart continued to make arts programmes, starting with Take Hart (which kept "The Gallery" segment), continuing with Hartbeat between 1984 and 1993, and SMart from 1994 until 2009.

== Series guide ==
- Series 1: 29 editions from 6 March 1964 – 29 October 1965
- Series 2: 6 editions from 5 January 1966 – 9 February 1966
- Series 3: 6 editions from 21 September 1966 – 26 October 1966
- Series 4: 7 editions from 1 February 1967 – 16 March 1967
- Series 5: 6 editions from 5 July 1967 – 9 August 1967
- Series 6: 12 editions from 27 December 1967 – 20 March 1968
- Series 7: 11 editions from 3 June 1969 – 12 August 1969
- Series 8: 9 editions from 22 April 1970 – 17 June 1970
- Series 9: 9 editions from 22 September 1970 – 17 November 1970
- Series 10A: 9 editions from 23 February 1971 – 27 April 1971
- Series 10B: Best of Vision On: 6 editions from 27 July 1971 – 31 August 1971
- Series 11: 16 editions from 14 December 1971 – 4 April 1972
- Series 12: 16 editions from 5 December 1972 – 27 March 1973
- Series 13: 16 editions from 1 January 1974 – 16 April 1974
- Series 14: 16 editions from 31 December 1974 – 22 April 1975
- Series 15: 14 editions from 10 February 1976 – 11 May 1976

== Archival Status ==
Over 70 episodes of the series are lost or have most footage missing, but all episodes from series 9 onwards are known to exist.

== Tie-in publication ==
- Vision On: A Book of Nonsense with Some Sense In It, published by the British Broadcasting Corporation in 1970. SBN: 563 09454 0.

No author's name given on cover, but publishing notes read '© The British Broadcasting Corporation and Pat Keysell 1970'.
