= Gerry Hughes (sailor) =

British sailor

Gerry Hughes is a British sailor who became the first profoundly deaf man to sail single-handed across the Atlantic Ocean. He crossed the finishing line off Castle Hill, Newport at 11:30 am local time (4:30 pm UTC) on Saturday 3 July 2005 after 35 days of sailing. Hughes also became the world's first deaf yachtsman to sail single-handed around the world to pass the five great capes. He departed Troon, Scotland on 1 September 2012 and returned to Troon on 8 May 2013. Dr Hughes was added as number 202 on Sir Robin Knox-Johnston's list of elite solo circumnavigators- In 2019 Gerry Hughes published a book about his life called 'Bridging Our Differences'.

== Biography ==
Gerry Hughes was born in Glasgow. He was profoundly deaf from birth. His father was a skilled sailor and Gerry enjoyed boating with him from around 2 years old in Largs, Rhu and Inverkip. At age 2 and a half, he was enrolled at St. Vincent's School for the Deaf. At thirteen Gerry began his schooling at St. John's School for the Deaf, Boston Spa, Yorkshire. He went on to attend Norfolk House College for the Deaf where he studied City and Guilds for London Institute Mechanical Engineering Part One Certificate, 'A' Level Technical Drawing, and ‘O’ Level Mathematics and Physics. During his time at Norfolk House, Gerry became captain for Surbiton Football Club. In his teenage years he was involved with a group of deaf sailors in the south of England and sailed across the English Channel. He became the first deaf skipper to sail around the British Isles, in 1981.

Gerry was a research associate for the British Sign Language Research Project (BSL) at Moray House College of Education working with Mary Brennan and Martin Colville.

Gerry was an early presenter on the BBC's Deaf programme See Hear.

Gerry went on to found a school for hearing and deaf people called ‘Quest for Language’ while at the same time studying towards a degree in mathematics from the Open University. In 1991, Gerry was offered a position as graduate instructor at St Vincent's School for the Deaf. After almost eighteen years from his first application to teacher training college, after being initially blocked from studying, and having to seek legal help, Gerry joined the PGCE course at St Andrew's College, Glasgow, to train as a secondary school teacher in mathematics. In 1995 he qualified as a teacher. He later became acting head of Donaldson's School for the Deaf in Edinburgh. Gerry later went on to teach at St Roch's Secondary School in Glasgow.

== Single-handed trans-Atlantic race ==
In August 2004, Hughes bought a 23-year-old, 34-foot yacht. He named the yacht Quest II.

Hughes set off from Portsmouth in Quest II, but was forced to call at Cork in Ireland for repairs due to a failure of battery power. Out in the Atlantic, a few days later, the battery power failed again, resulting is the loss of use of his navigation lights, generator, laptop computer and mobile phone. He continued, making use of an oil lamp.

When he eventually reached USA waters he was able to ask directions from a passing speed-boat encountered in fog. He reached Newport successfully when the fog had cleared.

== Sailing around the world ==
On 1 September 2012 Hughes left Troon, Scotland to start his eight-month journey across the world. Hughes travel around the world solo, sailed 32,000 miles and became the first deaf yachtsman to passed all five southernmost capes - Cape Agulhas, Cape Leeuwin, South East Cape, South West Cape and Cape Horn.
