= Clive Mason =

Scottish television presenter and actor

- Born: 1954; Glasgow
- Occupation(s): Television presenter, actor
- Website: See Hear Website

Clive Mason (born 1954) is a Deaf Scottish television presenter and actor.

== Early life ==
Mason was born in Glasgow, Scotland in 1954. Deaf since birth, he entered a school for deaf children when he was five years old. Until then, he had not been taught sign language and felt isolated due to communication problems.

== Career ==
Before starting his career in television, Mason had worked closely with Paddy Ladd, a deaf academic, who was researching and filming BSL in which Mason appeared as a BSL actor. When Mason was made redundant, he entered further education. Whilst at college, the BBC saw Mason in one of Ladd's BSL research videos and offered Mason a TV presenting job on See Hear, a programme for deaf and hard of hearing people, in 1984.

In addition to his job, Mason appeared in various Christmas shows and pantomime specials. He had also appeared as a regular guest in the BBC Schools' programme You and Me with Cosmo and Dibs.

In 2005, Mason was presented with a lifetime achievement award at the Remark! Film & TV Awards for his activism in Deaf issues. Judges considered Mason a "Deaf icon" and have commended him for inspiring young deaf people to enter the media industry.

From 2005 and 2008, Mason took part in national tours to provide a BSL version of the Harry Potter films, including Harry Potter and the Goblet of Fire and Harry Potter and the Order of the Phoenix, to increase accessibility for deaf children and children of deaf adults.

He has also achieved Level 4 NVQ qualification in British Sign Language at the RNID. Clive said "This qualification will enable me to go forward and achieve my A1 assessor certificate. I have always been in the media world and would like to extend my skills to NVQ 3 teaching and assessing and work for universities. I would also like to encourage local deaf people to work alongside me."

In 2012, Clive Mason, currently a Teaching Fellow in Bristol University's Centre for Deaf Studies, won Teacher of the Year for the South West region in the 2012 Signature Annual Awards. The awards are designed to "recognise individuals whose dedicated efforts help to overcome the communication barriers that Deaf people encounter in everyday life."

Some credit Mason as the first Deaf person to use British Sign Language (BSL) on British television.

To date, Mason is the longest-serving member of BBC's See Hear staff.

Since August 2013, Mason has been working as a deaf interpreter at Red Bee Media, for programmes on the BBC. On 25 December 2022, he made history by delivering the BSL version of the first Royal Christmas Message by Charles III.
