= Why Don't You? =

British children's TV series (1973–1995)

- Created by: Patrick Dowling
- Presented by: Ensemble cast of children
- No. of series: 42

Production
- Producers: Peter Charlton, Patrick Dowling, Catherine MacFarlane, David J. Evans, Kirstie Fisher, Russell T Davies, Trevor Stephenson-Long
- Running time: 25 minutes

Original release
- Network: BBC1
- Release: 20 August 1973 – 21 April 1995

Why Don't You? is a BBC children's television series created by producer/director Patrick Dowling and broadcast in 42 series between 20 August 1973 and 21 April 1995. The format consisted of groups or "gangs" of children responding to letters from viewers who wrote into the show suggesting games, 'makes' and days out. Typically these were arts-and-crafts activities or games and magic tricks children could learn to impress their friends. The full title, as heard on the title sequence, is "Why don’t you just switch off your television set and go out and do something less boring instead?"

== Broadcast history ==
The show was originally broadcast in the morning during the school summer holidays and once was shown during the weekday evening children's television slot. Later it went out during the Easter and Christmas school holidays although it was also broadcast once on Saturday mornings.

Russell T Davies was at one time a producer and director for Why Don't You...? before going on to greater fame as writer of Queer as Folk and producer of the 2005 revival of Doctor Who. Under Davies's direction, the format of the series shifted from magazine show to drama, with plots frequently centring on harebrained young Welsh presenter Ben Slade and his increasingly elaborate inventions. Slade was the longest serving presenter in the show's 22-year run. During the Russell T Davies/Ben Slade era, viewing figures rose from 0.9 to 3 million up against competition on ITV. Slade and Davies reunited in 2019 in a BBC Radio Wales documentary, first broadcast in December of that year.

Many of the episodes have been wiped from the BBC archives.

== Geographical variations ==
The 1972 pilot for Why Don't You was filmed in Henley-on-Thames, Oxfordshire, with a team of children from Valley Road Primary School. When the series proper launched in 1973, the gang's studio had been moved to Bristol and resembled a dusty basement; however, from 1980 the show also featured gangs from other parts of the United Kingdom, and these shows were made by the respective BBC regional centre, although all were broadcast nationwide. The first "alternative" gangs came from a barn in Scotland and a church hall in Belfast, followed by a seaside café in Cardiff. As the 1980s continued, all four studio settings were abandoned and the gang became based in other UK locations.

== Theme tune ==
The original 1973 theme was "I Say, I Say, I Say", from the De Wolfe Music Library, written by Paul Lewis and credited to The London Studio Group. This theme was retained until 1975.

In 1976 the theme changed to "Kings Road Raspberry Parade", written by Roger Greenaway & Roger Cook and performed by George Martin & His Orchestra.

By 1979 the opening theme had changed to the "Why Don't You?" song, written by Faron Brooks. This series retained "Kings Road Raspberry Parade" as the closing theme, but by 1981 this had been replaced by a reprise of the opening song.

By 1984 the opening song had been re-recorded by a children's choir.

By 1991 the theme tune had changed to one by Norman Cook. The last theme tune was introduced in 1994.

== Notable presenters ==
- Gideon Coe
- Andy Crane
- Daniel Evans
- Alexandra Fletcher
- Anthony McPartlin
- Pauline Quirke

== See also ==
- Wise Up
- Zoom (1972 TV series) and its revival.
