= You and Me (1974 British TV series) =

British children's TV series (1974–1992)

- Genre: Educational
- Country of origin: United Kingdom
- Original language: English

Production
- Running time: 15 minutes

Original release
- Network: BBC1 (1974–83); BBC2 (1983–92)
- Release: 14 January 1974 – 26 March 1992

You and Me is a British educational television programme as part of the BBC Schools strand from 14 January 1974 to 26 March 1992. The programmes consisted of various segments intended to educate and entertain young children and included elements for early literacy and numeracy. It is aimed at children aged between 3 and 5. The programme was broadcast during the periods when schools programmes were being shown although, during its time on BBC1, it was seen as a programme in its own right, rather than being part of the wider "For Schools and Colleges" sequence, and was introduced by the BBC1 logo rather than via the BBC Schools presentation sequence.

== Background ==
The first programme, called "A New House", was broadcast at 10:45am 14 January 1974 on BBC1. The series was influenced by the American series Sesame Street and the research done by the Children's Television Workshop, and was also influenced by the forerunners of other British children's education television series like Play School and Blue Peter. It also took guidance from the analysis of children's needs in the 1978 Warnock Report. It aimed therefore, in the jargon of the time, to be very much a "child-centred series" with an emphasis on a child's independence, enjoyment, and understanding. Emotional and social education were held to be as important as more traditional school skills. Relationships with the presenters, who were surrogate parents and carers, were seen as central. There was an assumption that most children watching would be in the company of an adult.

== Format ==
The series' original intention was to teach children safety, reading and emotional well-being. The show featured a mixture of human actors and puppets. In 1979, new characters were introduced which included the actor Tony Hughes as Herbert the Handyman, along with puppet characters that included Mr Bits and Pieces, a marionette made from household objects, and Purrfecta the Cat. Herbert was portrayed as a well-meaning but inept handyman, who invariably made a hopeless mess of any odd job he was called upon to do. Although only 5 episodes of Herbert the Handyman were made, they were repeated until 1983. Episodes were also introduced by either:

- Two stop frame animated characters, called Alice (a hamster) and Crow.
- a puppet dragon called Duncan and humans called Vicki (Jan-Feb 1979) and later Sam (Sept 1979-Feb 1982)
- Purrfecta the Pussycat and a human called Stephen. (They only featured together in a Maths unit April–May 1980)

=== Cosmo and Dibs era ===
In January 1983, two new puppets were introduced. They were a pair of friends of an uncategorisable animal species; Cosmo, a female, from the North East of England, and Dibs, male, a Londoner, both of whom lived in a street market.

The set was based on a street market in London’s Shepherd's Bush. Each programme featured a four-minute sketch with Cosmo and Dibs on an area of child interest: sharing, eating, arguing, bullying, sleeping, bereavement, dressing up, having a row, make-believe, making poetry – there were no limits, as long as the sketch was considered relevant and useful to the target audience.

The scripts aimed to inform, educate and entertain and see the world from a child’s point of view. Explicitly the aim was not to patronise. A successful group of sketches dealing with 'Safety' included the subject of child abuse, unusual in a series for this age group. It was welcomed by the charity Kidscape, and featured on the national news. Songs and stories were always included, with an emphasis on cultural diversity – You and Me was one of the few programmes at the time to do this.

Short documentary films covered various subjects from farming to the Notting Hill Carnival. Through their experiences in short dramas, viewers were invited to share the lives of contemporary 4- to 5-year-olds; whenever possible, the two puppets would be left without adult intervention to make their discoveries and act out every human emotion – anger, love, jealousy, greed, and fear, amongst others. For the last two series in the early 1990s, the street market disappeared and was replaced by a less adventurous, more adult-controlled domestic setting, and two additional characters (Baxter and Spike) were added. Simon Buckley and Richard Coombs puppeteered and voiced the newcomers. The running time was also reduced by 5 minutes.

== Production ==
The first series of twenty programmes was begun at the BBC's Lime Grove Studios, part of which overlooked Shepherd's Bush Market. It was completed at BBC Television Centre in Wood Lane, which became the show's regular home for all but the last series. In 1992, an independent production company, SFTV (the producers of the BBC's Words and Pictures as well as the creators of CITV's The Funbox) took over.

== Presenters ==
The presenters who appeared were cast from a diverse range of age-groups and social and ethnic backgrounds;

- Annette Badland
- Michael Balfour
- Jeni Barnett
- Joe Barton (Puppeteer and voice of Duncan the Dragon)
- Simon Buckley (Puppeteer and voice of Baxter)
- Charubala Chokshi
- Richard Coombs (Puppeteer and voice of Spike)
- Tony Hughes (who played the part of Herbert The Handyman)
- Vicky Ireland
- Frances Kay (Puppeteer and voice of Cosmo)
- Christopher Lillicrap
- Isabelle Lucas
- Clive Mason also joined the cast for programmes relevant to the deaf community.
- Christopher Neil
- Maggie Ollerenshaw
- Bill Owen
- Wendy Padbury (1976 - "Shapes" unit)
- Bharti Patel
- Anton Phillips
- Michael Snelders
- Harry Towb
- Larrington Walker
- Gary Wilmot
- Francis Wright (Puppeteer and voice of Dibs)

=== Puppet characters ===
- Crow and Alice
- Duncan the Dragon
- Mr Bits-and-Pieces
- Purrfecta the Cat
- Cosmo and Dibs

Cosmo and Dibs were played by Frances Kay and Francis Wright who puppeteered and voiced the characters throughout the series. The puppets were made by Muppet-maker and performer Tim Rose, and the scripts were written by members of the production team and cast.

=== Henry the Kangaroo ===
From 1981 until 1992 the show also included a regular item featuring Henry the Kangaroo, an animated cartoon incorporating live action. The item introduced 'social sight words' such as STOP and EXIT. Henry would say each time: 'I'm looking for the words in my book again...' His farewell line was: "Toodle-oo from the kangaroo, toodle-oo from me to you". Henry was voiced by Nigel Lambert.

== Theme tune ==
The theme was written by Charlie Dore, Julian Littman and Karl Johnson, and was originally an acoustic version. In 1983, it was replaced with a reggae version performed by UB40 which lasted until the series finished in 1992:

You and me, me and you,
Lots and lots for us to do,
Lots and lots for us to see,
Me and you, you and me …

The lyrics were referenced in the Oasis song "She's Electric", "Cos I'll be you and you'll be me, there's lots and lots for us to see, lots and lots for us to do".
