= Left Bank Two =

1963 jazz instrumental by Wayne Hill

Noveltones - "Left Bank Two" (1963)
12 second sample of "Left Bank Two".

Original 1963 10" single

1976 re-issue

"Left Bank Two" is a jazz music piece of De Wolfe library music for vibraphone, double bass, acoustic guitar and brushed drums composed by Wayne Hill in 1963 and performed by Hill as the soloist and the Noveltones, a group of session musicians from the Netherlands. The session was directed by Dutch musician and studio manager Frans Mijts. In the United Kingdom, it was used in "The Gallery" sequence during the children's television programme Vision On, in which the art sent into the programme by young viewers was displayed, and subsequently in the equivalent segment in early series of Take Hart, a programme presented by Tony Hart, formerly a co-presenter of Vision On. The track was also used in a similar capacity in CBBC's SMart.

The recording was issued as a 10-inch single by De Wolfe in 1964 as the B-side of the title "Left Bank One" and re-issued as a 7-inch single during the 1970s (with Left Bank Two as the A-side) to tie in with the popularity of Vision On. Left Bank One is a similar vibraphone-led instrumental with guitar vamping, brushes for backing, and a similar tempo, but is a completely different composition.

Library music by Wayne Hill was also used for the theme tune of the ATV television show The Power Game (1965–1969), the startup music for Ulster Television (titled "The Antrim Road") and some film soundtracks. Hill died some time before March 1967. The Noveltones name was also used for a number of other De Wolfe recordings.

== In popular culture ==
The track was used as background music in the 2008 PlayStation 3 video game LittleBigPlanet and used again in LittleBigPlanet 2, the latter as an 8-bit version of the track, and yet again in LittleBigPlanet Karting.

The track is also featured in the 2022 film Hundreds of Beavers.

The piece has been used in a number of adverts, including for Volkswagen, Castrol Oil, Trago Mills, Waitrose, and Samsung. A 2010 survey conducted by PRS for Music found that "Left Bank Two" was the fifth most frequently used song in adverts over the previous five years.
