= The Morph Files =

British stop-motion animated TV series (1996)

- Genre: Clay animation Children's television series Comedy; Adventure; Slapstick
- Created by: Aardman Animations; Peter Lord; David Sproxton
- Developed by: Aardman Animations; Peter Lord; David Sproxton
- Written by: Andy Walker
- Directed by: Peter Lord; David Sproxton
- Creative directors: Peter Lord; David Sproxton
- Narrated by: Neil Morrissey
- Theme music composer: Andy Walker
- Opening theme: "The Morph Files"
- Ending theme: "The Morph Files"
- Country of origin: United Kingdom
- Original languages: English (only for the narrator)
- No. of series: 1
- No. of episodes: 13

Production
- Executive producers: Peter Lord; David Sproxton
- Producer: Jacqueline White
- Cinematography: Peter Lord; David Sproxton
- Editor: Andrew Hassenruck
- Running time: 9 min
- Production company: Aardman Animations

Original release
- Network: Children’s BBC
- Release: 4 January – 29 March 1996

Related
- SMart; Morph TV

The Morph Files is a 1996 British children's stop-motion animated comedy television series featuring Morph. The series was narrated by Neil Morrissey and produced by Aardman Animations. The series is a mix of new animation and old footage from former shows, and features the same cast from The Amazing Adventures of Morph as well as footage from that show. It was originally aired on the BBC in 1996 and was later aired on the ABC in Australia from 1 June 1998 to 13 June 2000, ATV World in Hong Kong, SABC 2 in South Africa and Channel 5 and Arts Central in Singapore as well as on military television on BFBS and SSVC Television in a number of countries such as Germany, Falkland Islands and Cyprus.

== Reception ==
A review in The Video Librarian called the series "grating" due to the fact that the claymation characters sounded "like eunuch Teletubbies (or pre-literate Chipmunks)". It described one of the segments as "bland and uninspiring", while acknowledging that the series was "occasionally inventive".

== Episodes ==
| No. | Title | Original release date |
|---|---|---|
| 1 | "Babysitting" | 4 January 1996 |
| 2 | "Skiing" | 11 January 1996 |
| 3 | "Gobbledygook" | 18 January 1996 |
| 4 | "Doctor Morph" | 25 January 1996 |
| 5 | "The Dog Show" | 1 February 1996 |
| 6 | "Exercising" | 15 February 1996 |
| 7 | "Games" | 22 February 1996 |
| 8 | "The Film Show" | 29 February 1996 |
| 9 | "Gardening" | 7 March 1996 |
| 10 | "Mirrors" | 14 March 1996 |
| 11 | "Little Green" | 21 March 1996 |
| 12 | "Cowboys" | 28 March 1996 |
| 13 | "The Birthday Party" | 29 March 1996 |

== Home media releases ==
In 1998, 20th Century Fox Home Entertainment released the series on VHS in the United States. Each of the three VHS tapes contained four (and five) episodes from the series. In the United Kingdom, the entire series was released on both VHS and DVD by Universal Pictures Home Entertainment whilst other VHS tapes were released by Roadshow Entertainment and ABC Video in Australia.
