= Hartbeat =

British children's television programme

- Starring: Tony Hart
- Country of origin: United Kingdom
- Original language: English
- No. of series: 10
- No. of episodes: 132

Production
- Running time: 30mins (Special: 60mins)

Original release
- Network: Children's BBC
- Release: 14 September 1984 – 17 November 1993

Related
- Vision On; Take Hart; The Amazing Adventures of Morph

Hartbeat is a Children's BBC television arts programme presented by Tony Hart. It was broadcast between 1984 and 1993. The series was a follow on from Take Hart and taught children how to design art features and use everyday items to make objects.

== History ==
Like its predecessor Take Hart, Hartbeat featured Hart and the animated Plasticine character Morph and taught children how to design art features and use everyday items to make objects. The first episode aired on 14 September 1984. Throughout its run it was shown during the afternoons with the first series on Fridays as a standalone programme. The second series onwards adopted the Children's BBC branding in 1985, when the service was launched, at which time it was moved to Wednesday afternoons where it remained until the series ended in 1993. Each episode was approximately half an hour in length.

== Theme ==
Hartbeat continued the themes covered by Take Hart but was a deliberate attempt to update the image of its predecessor. A more modern set of opening titles using rudimentary CGI and a synthesised theme tune were introduced. The theme tune was composed by David Owen Smith.

Several young female co-presenters were added, initially alternating between Margot Wilson, Joanna Kirk, Gabrielle Bradshaw, Alison Millar and Liza Brown. The studio backdrops were also changed to reflect the new direction of the series. In another attempt to move away from the format of Take Hart, a storyline was also featured in each episode to keep casual viewers interested, generally revolving around a topic – e.g. a broken computer, Tony's birthday or something similar. Some fans of Take Hart felt that the inclusion of storylines was upstaging the premise of the show.

The "Gallery" segment, as featured in both Take Hart and its predecessor Vision On, in which viewers would send in their own artworks, also remained in the series and has continued to be used until 2009 in the BBC Children's programme SMart. In addition, with the advent of computers in schools at this time, Hart would often arrange for professional graphic designers to visit the studio so that they could demonstrate the use of computers in art and craft and show off the latest software made for this purpose.

Colin Bennett continued playing the role of Mr Bennett, the bumbling caretaker from Take Hart, and the end of each episode normally featured a humorous segment where Mr Bennett would distract Tony while in the middle of a task (such as filling up a sink to do the washing up), then after the closing credits Tony would be shown dealing with aftermath caused by Mr Bennett's distraction (such as the sink overflowing and flooding the studio). In the 1989 series Mr Bennett was replaced with the dotty tea lady Elvira Muckett played by Amanda Swift. Elvira could generally be heard calling "Te-ea!" and would "annoyingly" refer to Tony and the co-presenter of the day as "Mr and Mrs Hartbeat". Her first appearance featured her humming the original Take Hart theme "Left Bank Two" in an attempt to appeal to longer-term viewers.

Eventually Elvira was replaced by an accident-prone cleaning-lady named Alison in 1992 in an attempt to bring back the "comedy" element left by Mr Bennett's departure.

== Popularity ==
In its heyday between 1984 and 1990, Hartbeat regularly attracted over 5 million viewers which was, at the time, a very high figure for a children's television series in the UK, and was one of the most popular series broadcast on Children's BBC. The popularity of the series led to repeats being shown on the CBBC segment of BBC2's short-lived daytime television service Daytime on Two in a morning slot, during school holidays between 1986 and 1989.

By 1992, Hartbeat viewing figures were on the wane, and the BBC finally decided to discontinue the series a year later. The final episode aired on 17 November 1993.

== Hart's retirement ==
Following the end of Hartbeat, Tony Hart took a break from presenting for two years before reemerging with the show Artbox Bunch for two series in 1995 and 1996 and then in Smart Hart for two series in 1999 and 2000 before announcing his retirement from television in 2001.

== Series guide ==
- Series 1 – 15 editions – 14 September 1984 – 21 December 1984
- Series 2 – 15 editions – 11 September 1985 – 18 December 1985
- Series 3 – 15 editions – 10 September 1986 – 17 December 1986
- Series 4 – 15 editions – 16 September 1987 – 23 December 1987
- Series 5 – 13 editions – 14 September 1988 – 7 December 1988
- Series 6 – 15 editions – 13 September 1989 – 20 December 1989
- Series 7 – 14 editions – 12 September 1990 – 19 December 1990
- Series 8 – 10 editions – 11 September 1991 – 13 November 1991
- Comic Relief special – 12 February 1992
- Series 9 – 10 editions – 15 September 1992 – 17 November 1992
- Series 10 – 10 editions – 15 September 1993 – 17 November 1993

Artbox Bunch

- Series 1: 13 editions from 1 January 1995 – 26 March 1995
- Series 2: 13 editions from 30 December 1995 – 30 March 1996

Smart Hart

- Series 1: 6 editions from 9 July 1999 – 20 August 1999
- Series 2: 11 editions from 14 July 2000 – 22 September 2000
