= The Adventure Game =

1980s UK game show

- Genre: Game show
- Directed by: Ian Oliver
- Theme music composer: Ferdinando Carulli (s1, 3-4); Edvard Grieg (s2)
- Opening theme: Duo in G, Op. 34 No. 2: Rondo, (s1, 3-4); Norwegian Dance Opus 35 no. 2 (s2)
- Country of origin: United Kingdom
- Original language: English
- No. of series: 4
- No. of episodes: 22

Production
- Producers: Patrick Dowling (s1-2); Ian Oliver (s3-4)
- Running time: 26-45 minutes
- Production company: BBC

Original release
- Network: BBC1 (1980); BBC2 (1981-6)
- Release: 24 May 1980 – 18 February 1986

The Adventure Game is a game show originally broadcast on BBC1 and BBC2 between 24 May 1980 and 18 February 1986. The story in each show was that the two celebrity contestants and a member of the public had travelled by spaceship to the planet Arg. Their overall task varied with each series. For example, the team might be charged with finding a crystal to power their ship to return to Earth. The programme is often considered to have been a forerunner of The Crystal Maze, and part influence for Knightmare.

== Background ==
The programme was devised by experienced BBC producer Patrick Dowling (who also introduced episodes of series 2). Dowling was interested in Dungeons & Dragons and wanted to televise a show to capture the mood. The programme had a similar sci-fi feel influenced by Douglas Adams; Dowling asked Adams to write the show, but he was working on the television production of The Hitchhiker's Guide to the Galaxy. The first two series were written and produced by Dowling and directed by Ian Oliver, who wrote and produced the final two after Dowling retired. Peter Hawkins provided the opening narration for series one and four.

== Characters ==
Arg was inhabited by shapeshifting dragons known as Argonds. As a reference to this, most proper nouns in the programme (including Argond) were anagrams of the word dragon. Argonds commonly shifted form, primarily to human, to avoid scaring contestants a few minutes before the contestants arrived.

Notable characters within the game included:

- The Rangdo was the ruler of planet Arg and was initially referred to as "Uncle" by the other Argonds. In the first series, his human form was played by Ian Messiter, who appeared as an old professor in a velvet jacket, but in later series, he became one of the few Argonds not to appear as a dragon. In series 2 and 3, he became an aspidistra on a plant stand. In series 3, he could move around the room and roared and shook when he was angry (the Rangdo was controlled by Kenny Baker). Any human meeting the Rangdo had to placate him by bowing while saying "Gronda! Gronda!". In the last series, the Rangdo became a teapot instead, spouting steam when displeased.
- Darong (series 1, played by BBC newsreader Moira Stuart).
- Gnoard (series 1 – 3, played by Charmian Gradwell), whose job it was to explain the initial stages of the game to the contestants.
- Dorgan (series 4, played by Sarah Lam), who took over from Gnoard in the final series.
- Gandor (series 1 – 4, played by Chris Leaver), an ancient, half-deaf butler who took the contestants through most of the puzzles and refereed the Vortex and Drogna games. In some episodes, he could only hear when he was wearing his spectacles, which he continually (and conveniently) misplaced.
- Rongad (series 3 & 4, played by Bill Homewood), because he was Australian, spoke English backwards, and could only understand the contestants if they did the same. Noted for singing Waltzing Matilda in reverse and exclamations of "Doogy Rev!" when the contestants did well. He appears in every episode of series three and episode 2 of series four.
- Angord (series 4, actor unknown) was an Argond who never seemed to turn into a human. She always misbehaved when Gandor and Dorgan were checking the puzzles.
- The Mole (series 2, played by Lesley Judd), pretended to be one of the regular contestants but was working against them. The actress had been a genuine contestant in the first series.

The look of the characters in Argond form was different in the various series. In Series 1, they looked like dragons, and each was distinct. In Series 2, they didn't look like dragons, but were furry, with no tails and mask-like faces, and primarily differed in colour. In Series 3 and 4, their heads returned to looking like dragons, with ruffs, though they had furry bodies and monkey-like tails and were almost identical to each other.

Notable contestants included Keith Chegwin, Sue Cook, astronomer Heather Couper, John Craven, Paul Darrow, Noel Edmonds, Sarah Greene, Bonnie Langford, James Burke, Elizabeth Estensen, Janet Fielding, and Richard Stilgoe.

The credits for the series listed the human characters as being played by Argonds rather than the other way around.

== Common tasks ==
The contestants had to complete several tasks to achieve their overall goal (i.e., regain their crystal and return to their ship). Many tasks involved the drogna, a small transparent plastic disc containing a solid geometric figure, which was the currency of Arg. The value of a drogna was its numbered position in the visible spectrum multiplied by the number of sides of the figure (though the contestants usually failed to work this out). For example, a red circle is worth one unit, an orange circle is worth two units, a red triangle and a yellow circle are both worth three and so on.

Tasks that often appeared included:

- Interaction with a computer, in series 1 a 2D dungeon-crawl-type game on an HP 9845 Technical Desktop, then later a text chat with an Apple II that generally failed to provide any useful information until the password was revealed elsewhere and entered into the computer, then in series 3 and 4 a pseudo-3D first-person POV dungeon crawl on a BBC Micro to find the password in the maze. In series 3, the players were guiding an alien doglike creature called a Dogran (voiced in a Cockney accent) down his "Dogran-hole" after meeting him in person. In series 4, the radio-controlled dog puppet was eliminated, and the players guided an unseen entity speaking in a Scouse accent to find the password "somewhere in the north" of the maze.
- The Drogna Game usually came in the middle of the programme. The game's rules of play, format, and result were changed frequently, always with each series, and sometimes from one episode to another. Two players played one variation from series three: one player was a contestant, and the other a creature known as the Red Salamander of Zardil. This became so popular that Acornsoft released a home version for the BBC Micro, written by Patrick Dowling.
- "How many Argonds are around the pond?" This game was played predominantly in Series 4 just before the Vortex game. Every player had a chance to win, and winners received a "Green Cheese roll" or, in later episodes, a "Great Crystal of Arg" to fanfare. The green cheese roll was of use when playing the Vortex. Gandor compèred the game; it started on a table with several Drogna inside a velvet bag. He shook the bag, withdrew some drognas, placed them on the table, and asked the first contestant, "How many Argonds are around the pond?". The contestants would usually either count the drognas or the non-blue drognas (assuming the blue one represented the pond), add the sides or points of the geometric figures on the drognas, and fail to guess the correct number. The key was that Gandor placed his fingers on the tabletop as he said, "How many Argonds are around the pond?" The number of fingers he placed on the table was the right answer.

Gnoard demonstrates the Vortex task.

- The Vortex (series 2 - 4). This was the last task in the programme. To return to their ship, the players had to jump between a grid of points, taking turns with their opponent, the Vortex. The Vortex was represented by a video-effect-generated pulsating column in series two and a computer-generated flashing column in series 3 and 4. If the human player jumped into the Vortex (which they could not see), it would explode, and the human was said to have been "evaporated," losing the game and making a long trip back to Earth which had to be walked by foot along the interplanetary highway. Patrick Dowling devised the game, saying that his inspiration was probably Nine men's morris.

== Episodes ==
Episodes with a dagger (†) after the number are missing from the BBC archives. However, some of these 'missing' episodes do exist as off-air recordings and are included on the DVD version of the show.

=== Series 1 ===
Originally broadcast in 1980 on BBC1 on Saturday mornings.

They were repeated in 1980 on BBC2 on Saturday mid-afternoons.

Episode	Broadcast date	Repeat date	Duration (minutes)	Participants	DVD
1	24 May 1980	27 September 1980	26	Elizabeth Estensen, Fred Harris, Mark Dugdale	Disk 1-1
2†	31 May 1980	4 October 1980	37	Liza Goddard, Michael Rodd, Stephen Cox	N/A
3	7 June 1980	11 October 1980	37	Pat Cater, Maggie Philbin, James Burke	Disk 1-3
4	14 June 1980	18 October 1980	29	Denise Coffey, Dr. Garry Hunt, Toby Freeman	Disk 1-2
5†	21 June 1980	25 October 1980	45	Lesley Judd, Robert Malos, Paul Darrow	Disk 1-4

=== Series 2 ===
Originally broadcast in 1981 on BBC2 on Monday early evenings.

It was repeated in 1982 on BBC1 on Friday late afternoons.

Episode	Broadcast date	Repeat date	Duration (minutes)	Participants	DVD
1	2 November 1981	28 May 1982	45	Graeme Garden, Carol Chell, Nicolas Hammond	Disk 2-1
2†	9 November 1981	4 June 1982	45	Madeline Smith, David Yip, Derek Gale	Disk 2-2
3	16 November 1981	11 June 1982	45	David Singmaster, Sue Cook, Philip Sheppard	Disk 2-3
4†	23 November 1981	18 June 1982	44	Tessa Hamp, Nerys Hughes, Derek Griffiths	N/A
5	30 November 1981	25 June 1982	45	John Craven, Bill Green, Kirsty Miller	Disk 2-4

=== Series 3 ===
Originally broadcast in 1984 on BBC2 on Thursday early evenings.

It was repeated in 1985 on BBC2 on Thursday early evenings.

Episode	Broadcast date	Repeat date	Duration (minutes)	Participants	DVD
1	2 February 1984	5 September 1985	39	Sarah Greene, Anne Miller, Richard Stilgoe	Disk 3-1
2	9 February 1984	12 September 1985	38	Sue Nicholls, Duncan Goodhew, Emma Disley	Disk 3-2
3	16 February 1984	19 September 1985	40	Adam Tandy, Sandra Dickinson, Chris Serle	Disk 3-3
4	23 February 1984	26 September 1985	39	Paul McDowell, Bonnie Langford, Christopher Hughes	Disk 4-1
5	1 March 1984	3 October 1985	39	Janet Fielding, Nigel Crocket, Neil Adams	Disk 4-2
6	8 March 1984	10 October 1985	45	Fern Britton, Noel Edmonds, Ray Virr	Disk 4-3

=== Series 4 ===
Originally broadcast in 1986 on BBC2 on Tuesday early evenings.

Repeated in 2002, 2003, and 2004 on the digital TV channel Challenge.

Episode	Broadcast date	Duration (minutes)	Participants	DVD
1	7 January 1986	39	Sheelagh Gilbey, Roy Kane, Ian McNaught-Davis	Disk 5-1
2	14 January 1986	39	Johnny Ball, Barbara Lott, Liz Hobbs	Disk 5-2
3	21 January 1986	39	David Sandeman, Fiona Kennedy, Ian McCaskill	Disk 5-3
4	11 February 1986 (Note: The broadcast of this episode was postponed from 28 January 1986 due to coverage of the Space Shuttle Challenger disaster.)	38	Joanna Monro, Val Prince, George Layton	Disk 6-1
5	4 February 1986	38	Prof. Heinz Wolff, Deborah Leigh Hall, Ruth Madoc	Disk 6-2
6	18 February 1986	39	Heather Couper, Keith Chegwin, Adam Gilbey	Disk 6-3

== Signature tune ==
- Series 1, 3 & 4: Duo in G, Op. 34 No. 2: Rondo, composed by Ferdinando Carulli and performed by classical guitarists Julian Bream and John Williams (it also appears on their album Together)
- Series 2: Norwegian Dance Opus 35 No. 2, composed by Edvard Grieg and performed by a brass band

== Home video releases ==
In 2016, the show was made available to purchase for the first time, with seven episodes from the first two series available digitally from the online BBC Store. The store and apps were discontinued on 1 November 2017, making purchased programmes no longer playable.

A six-DVD box set of the series was released on 12 June 2017, rated U. The DVDs are region 2–encoded, with a total running time of 665 minutes. The artwork on the discs represents five different colours and shapes of Drogna.

== See also ==
- The Crystal Maze - considered to be The Adventure Game's successor.
- Incredible Games - Children's BBC version of The Adventure Game, which used many of the same games.
- Knightmare - virtual reality children's game show.
