= Bill Homewood =

English actor and singer

Bill Homewood is an English television and stage actor and singer. He worked on several BBC Children's television series in the 1970s and 1980s, and was subsequently known for his work in the Royal Shakespeare Company, in the West End, on tour, and his recordings of audiobooks. He is also a published poet.

== Career ==
=== Early career ===
After training, Homewood joined the Sadler's Wells New Opera Company of Sadler's Wells at the London Coliseum (later the English Opera Company) as a principal, playing opposite John Tomlinson as Historian in Elizabeth Lutyens's Time Off, and performed in concert and oratorio. He also travelled in solo cabaret (songs with guitar) across Britain and started his television career on BBC Children's Television where he became a regular in such shows as Watch, Multi-Coloured Swap Shop, Saturday Superstore, Rainbow and So You Want to be Top?. He was well known as "The Backwards Man", owing to his unusual ability to speak (and sing) backwards, demonstrated in his regular performance as Rongad in The Adventure Game for the BBC. Also for the BBC he played Blondel in The Talisman and Player King in Hamlet with Derek Jacobi in the title role.

=== Radio and audiobooks ===
Homewood's radio drama credits include Captain Hook in Peter Pan (PBS Radio, US) and Saturday Night and Sunday Morning for BBC Radio. He has recorded several audiobook CDs for companies such as Naxos, including Les Misérables, The Three Musketeers, The Hunchback Of Notre Dame, The Man In The Iron Mask, Tom Jones, King Solomon's Mimes, She, Gargantua & Pantagruel, Shakespeare's Lovers (with Estelle Kohler) and the Zorro series. Homewood's Count Of Monte Cristo for Naxos is an evergreen audiobook best-seller.

In 2016 Ukemi Audiobooks released Great French Poems, a solo album in which Homewood performs 35 classics, delivering each poem first in French and then in his own English translation.

=== Visiting academic appointments ===
In 1979 Homewood was made Honorary Citizen of Austin, Texas. He has held several visiting appointments in conservatories and universities, including Visiting Fellow in Theatre at Lancaster University, Dean of the British American Drama Academy and has been twice Eminent Chair in Theatre at Florida Atlantic University.

In 1983 he founded the Shakespeare text course at RADA, London.

== Published credits ==
Homewood's publications include Theatrical Letters – 400 years of English-speaking Theatre History, in the words of the actors themselves; foreword by Sir John Gielgud, Marginalia Press 1995, Under The Blue – Selected Poems by Bill Homewood, Mimosa Books 2015 Poésies – Poèmes et Chansonnettes by Bill Homewood (in French), Mimosa Books 2017. Homewood's translation of St Exupéry's Terre Des Hommes (Land Of Men) was released in 2016 on Ukemi Audiobooks. His other writing credits include many commissioned screenplays and play scripts, including Kafka's The Trial, premiered at the Young Vic Theatre, London in 1993, starring James Wilby.
