= Charmian Gradwell =

British actress

Charmian Gradwell (born February 1960) is a British actress, best known for her role in the television game show The Adventure Game. She also played Jenny Richards in Howards' Way. She has played many lead roles in the West End and has represented Britain in the kayak marathon. She was a gold medallist at the world masters in 1997.

Later in her career, she tore her anterior cruciate ligament, an injury which left her unable to walk. Upon recovery, she responded to an advertisement for volunteer drama and voice specialists in Nigeria, helping women and children find self-empowerment through theatre. This inspired her to retrain as a voice and text coach.

From 2005 to 2008 she worked for the Royal Shakespeare Company as a voice specialist.

In 2008, Gradwell began work as voice and text coach at Sydney Theatre Company, in Sydney Australia, where she is currently employed.

== Performance biography ==
Charmian Gradwell trained at the Bristol Old Vic. She has been directed by Peter Hall in Lysistrata at Wyndhams and by Michael Bogdonov in Orwell's England at the National Theatre.

Her Shakespearean credits include Juliet at the Bristol Old Vic, Miranda in The Tempest, Luciana in Comedy of Errors, Olivia in Twelfth Night and Octavia in Antony and Cleopatra at the Chichester Festival Theatre.

At the Garrick Theatre she played Lucy in Easy Virtue. She played Mrs. Crachit in A Christmas Carol in Stockholm and toured in the most recent production of Macbeth with Actors From The London Stage. Her other roles include Annie in Tom Stoppard's The Real Thing, Suzanne in The Scarlet Pimpernel at Her Majesty's Theatre, and Mrs. Bradman in Blithe Spirit.

She is equally at home in musical theatre, where she has appeared in Gypsy and Godspell.

Gradwell's television credits include appearances in Wilderness Edge, Howards' Way, Adventure Game, Let's Pretend, and Return of Shelley.

Outside of traditional theatrical venues, she is very interested in the role of theatre for development in the Third World. She is also a core member of the London Shakespeare Workout, which brings Shakespeare into prisons in the United Kingdom.
