= Memnos Costi =

English TV & football player

- Born: 14 August 1976 (age 48); England
- Occupation(s): Television presenter, a great football player, a great manager
- Website: Official Website

Memnos Costi (born 14 August 1976) is an English television presenter and football player who is deaf. He is a presenter on the deaf magazine programme See Hear.

== Biography ==
=== Personal life ===
Costi was born in England to Greek Cypriot parents, and grew up in Tottenham. He has been deaf since birth.

Costi went to Sir Winston Churchill School for the Deaf until the age of 15. At this time he moved to Burwood Park School for the Deaf where he remained until he was 16 years old. His brother is fellow footballer Marios Costi. He currently lives in Hertfordshire with his wife and two daughters.

=== Career ===
==== Football ====
In 2002, Costi was a member of the Great Britain squad for deaf football.

From 10 to 23 June 2007, Costi, along with his brother, represented Cyprus in the European Deaf Championship.

==== Acting and presenting ====
At the age of 12, Costi appeared at the Royal Opera House, Covent Garden. At 16 he began his television career on the BBC's See Hear, where he has remained ever since.

In 2002, Costi and Semhar Beyene were approached by producer Andrew Stibbs to take part in a project which involved creating a BSL interpretation of the famous classic Somethin' Stupid.

In 2013, Costi and his eldest daughter appeared in the BBC drama 'Holby City'. Costi played a deaf single father about to undergo a heart operation, and his daughter portrayed an interpreter who did not tell her father the full risks of his surgery.

In 2018, Costi was one of the seven BSL translators for the Stand Up To Cancer UK telethon on 4seven.
