= Terry Ruane =

English theatre director (1946–2024)

Terry Ruane (21 November 1946 – 13 October 2024) was an English actor and theatre director.

== Life and career ==
Ruane became profoundly deaf as a result of meningitis at the age of five. Although educated in an oral school, he was also a sign language user, and from 1974 he was the General Manager of the British Theatre of the Deaf under Pat Keysell which was the first-ever professional company of deaf actors to tour Great Britain presenting plays in sign language. When Keysell resigned in 1976, Ruane went on to develop and tour his own company, Interim Theatre Company, which continued for some years and he is believed to be the first deaf person in the UK to co-direct a play, Hearing at Birmingham Repertory Theatre in 1979.

In the early 1980s he had various projects occupying him in the United States, and was involved in setting up the London production of Children of a Lesser God and later ran a Theatre in Education project using sign language for children in special schools. In 1984, he wrote and acted in the first of several BBC See Hear Christmas specials during which time he also did a stint on the program as a reporter up to 1996. He had worked both as a lecturer and moderator on a course at Reading University which specializes in theatre arts using sign language. When he retired, he still ran Theatresign, a company that supplies West End and regional Theatres with sign language interpreters including his ex-wife Donna Ruane.

Ruane retired in September 2024, having been diagnosed with cancer. He died the following month, on 13 October, at the age of 77.

== Sources ==
- Biography of Terry Ruane from Theatreaign
