= You Should Be So Lucky (TV series) =

- Presented by: Colin Bennett
- No. of episodes: 12

Production
- Running time: 25 mins

Original release
- Network: BBC
- Release: 19 February 1986 – 11 February 1987

You Should Be So Lucky is a BBC children's television programme broadcast from 1986 to 1987. It was hosted by Colin Bennett in the character of Vince Purity.

It was a game show, during which contestants played on a giant snakes and ladders board. Points were earned by their team partners through talent tasks (such as singing, or physical games).

Bennett had four assistants, three young girls and a boy, called the "Purettes". The girls would introduce themselves as 'April', 'May', and 'June' at the start of the show. The boy's name was Alex, but Bennett occasionally jokingly referred to him as 'July' in the show. The show was themed around travelling showbusiness with Purity and the Purettes arriving for each episode in a dilapidated transit van.
