= The Amazing Adventures of Morph =

1980s British clay animation series

- Genre: Animation; Family; Comedy
- Created by: Aardman Animations
- Directed by: Peter Lord; David Sproxton
- Starring: Tony Hart; Morph; Chas; Nailbrush; Grandmorph; Delilah; Gillespie; Folly; Gobbledygook; The Very Small Creatures
- Narrated by: Tony Hart
- Country of origin: United Kingdom
- Original language: English
- No. of episodes: 26

Production
- Producer: Patrick Dowling
- Running time: 5 minutes
- Production company: Aardman Animations (originally credited as Morph Ltd.)

Original release
- Network: BBC1
- Release: 13 October 1980 – 18 May 1981

Related
- The Morph Files (1995); spun off from Take Hart (1977)

The Amazing Adventures of Morph is a British stop-motion clay animation children's television series created by Aardman Animations which ran from 1980 to 1981. It featured the character Morph and his cream-coloured best friend Chas. Footage from the show was reused in the 1996 show The Morph Files.

== Production ==
The character of Morph debuted on the children's art-themed TV show Take Hart with Tony Hart in 1977. This series served as a spin-off to Take Hart and a showcase for Morph. The character had become so popular that the BBC commissioned 26 5-min episodes featuring the character.

== Characters ==
As well as Morph, his cream-coloured best friend Chas, and Tony Hart from previous appearances, the show incorporated various additional characters; Folly (a female tinfoil figure), Gillespie (large, blue and dim-witted), Grandmorph (an elderly grey-bearded version of Morph with a skateboard and a knack for inventing things), Delilah (a blonde female in a yellow dress and glasses who serves as a straight character) Nailbrush (a nailbrush dog), Gobbledygook (a green alien) and The Very Small Creatures. Early versions of Folly and Gillespie had previously made a brief appearance in Take Hart. Tony Hart appears as himself narrating the book about their adventures happening at the same time and often interacts with the characters themselves.

== Cast ==
- Tony Hart as Himself/Narrator (voice)
- Morph
- Chas
- Nailbrush
- Grandmorph
- Delilah
- Gillespie
- Folly
- Gobbledygook
- The Very Small Creatures

== Episodes ==
(Actual original episode titles and dates were sourced from Radio Times and BBC Genome)

| No. | Title | Original release date |
|---|---|---|
| 1 | "The Beginning" | 13 October 1980 |
Morph decides to write a book about his adventures using Grandmorph's newly brought word-processing machine.
| 2 | "The Day Nothing Happened" | 14 October 1980 |
On a boring day, Morph tries to entertain himself by playing soccer and hide and seek with his friends.
| 3 | "Morph Plays Golf" | 15 October 1980 |
Morph goes golfing with Grandmorph, but Chas, The Very Small Creatures, and Gillespie prank and sabotage Morph's attempts so Chas can win.
| 4 | "Morph's Birthday Party" | 16 October 1980 |
Morph's friends secretly set up a surprise birthday party for Morph when he's not looking.
| 5 | "The Day Morph Was Ill" | 18 October 1980 |
Morph is diagnosed with illness and they try to help him out - but end up getting tired out when he feels better, forcing Morph to tend to them!
| 6 | "Morph's Forgotten Dream" | 20 October 1980 |
Morph has an amazing dream and tries to write about it, but by then, he cannot remember what it was.
| 7 | "Morph the Weakling" | 22 October 1980 |
After learning that Delilah is stronger than they are, Morph and Chas attempt to get fit.
| 8 | "The Dog Show" | 23 October 1980 |
Morph is training Nailbrush for the dog show, but Chas decides to sabotage his plans.
| 9 | "The Two Mountaineers" | 24 October 1980 |
Morph and Chas attempt to steal Tony's tea cake from a shelf while the latter is busy with the phone.
| 10 | "The Double Decker Boot" | 27 October 1980 |
Morph buys a double-decker mobile home and moves out for a life on the road, only to find that the great outdoors isn't all it's bargained for.
| 11 | "The Cowboys" | 30 October 1980 |
Morph plays a game of cowboys with Desperate Dan McChas, which ends with a tin of paint being spilled. The order is soon returned by Sheriff Grandmorph and his partner Nailbrush.
| 12 | "The Day Morph Went Ski-ing" | 31 October 1980 |
It's been snowing under Tony's desk. Folly and Delilah build a snowman that the Very Small Creatures try to knock over, Chas and Grandmorph go sledging, Gillespie makes a giant snowball, and Morph goes skiing and gets lost.
| 13 | "The Abominable Snowman" | 3 November 1980 |
It's still snowing outside and Grandmorph tells Morph and his friends about the Yeti. Next day, Morph and Chas find strange footprints in the snow...
| 14 | "The Invisible Morph" | 6 November 1980 |
Morph is having difficulty metamorphosing and ends up turning invisible.
| 15 | "Anyone for Cricket?" | 7 November 1980 |
Morph and Chas are having a game of cricket, but their bat and ball are confiscated when they accidentally knock Grandmorph off his skateboard. The pair devises ridiculous schemes to retrieve the lost items.
| 16 | "A Swimming Pool in the Garden" | 27 April 1981 |
Morph is tending to his garden on a lovely hot day, while Chas helps from his deckchair. As Morph waters the garden, the water drips through under the table. Gillespie's investigations into the cause of the 'leak' result in the destruction of Morph's garden. But the others soon find a suitable replacement.
| 17 | "The Strange Visitor" | 28 April 1981 |
Morph finds an odd-looking, "exceedingly ugly" stranger sleeping next to his box one morning. The stranger seems to like to eat everything, including Morph's leg. Then the visitor's mother turns up to thank Morph for looking after her offspring.
| 18 | "A Game of Chess" | 1 May 1981 |
One day, Tony is late, and Morph has to tell the story for the program by himself, after he's finished his game of chess with Gillespie. Morph finds that he can't read the book, so he makes up his own story. Unfortunately, Morph's stories aren't quite as realistic as Tony's, as they involve a lot of flying and dragon slaying.
| 19 | "Very Small Creature Green" | 6 May 1981 |
Grandmorph has invented a hot-and-cold-running-soft-drinks-machine, and everyone is trying it out. The very small creatures are carrying lots of bits and pieces for the machine, but the green one gets left behind. Morph and Chas start ordering him about and making fun of him. Finally, Green gets fed up with being left behind, and Morph tries teaching him how to "morphalize".
| 20 | "Grandmorph's Beard" | 7 May 1981 |
Delilah is desperately searching for her lost glasses, while Gillespie is cutting Grandmorph's hair. When Delilah spots her glasses caught in Grandmorph's beard she spins in him the chair, causing Gillespie to accidentally cut the beard off. Grandmorph is angrier than he's ever been and he stomps off to bed.
| 21 | "The Baby-Sitters" | 8 May 1981 |
Folly is babysitting for a friend, but doesn't tell anyone about it. Morph and Chas's fighting causes the baby to start crying, and everyone has a go at calming him down. Morph decides that the best way would be to put on a show for him, so they all participate in the Circus Morph.
| 22 | "Morph Sticks With It" | 11 May 1981 |
Morph finds one day that he can't open his box, and is puzzled by lots of pieces of paper lying around. He soon discovers that Chas has been playing around with the glue, but when the two start fighting they both have sticky problems.
| 23 | "Gobbledegook the Burglar" | 13 May 1981 |
All sorts of odds-and-ends have been going missing from under the table, including Delilah's saw, Chas's cricket bat, Grandmorph's skateboard, and Morph's comic. Morph sets out to look for clues while Grandmorph sets up a burglar alarm, but the missing items may not have been stolen: they may have been eaten.
| 24 | "Grandmorph's Home Movies" | 14 May 1981 |
Morph is embarrassed by Grandmorph’s screening of his home-movies, which include early footage of Morph as a tiny baby.
| 25 | "Morph & the Swoggle-Flange" | 15 May 1981 |
Grandmorph is trying to fix the soft drink machine, but he’s lost the vital component – the Swoggle-Flange! Morph embarks on a search mission to find the lost Swoggle-flange using some homemade dowsing rods.
| 26 | "The Magic Wand" | 18 May 1981 |
Morph and Chas have to look after Gobbledegook for the day, but it all goes wrong when Gobbledegook discovers a magic hat and wand. He starts making strange things appear, then turns Chas into a dog and can't seem to work out how to turn him back into Chas...

== HD restoration ==
From 20 March to 2 October 2015, HD restored versions of all 26 episodes of the series were uploaded to YouTube.

== Critical reception ==
In January 2014, MSN UK said "It would be fantastic to see this show back on terrestrial TV - it was entertaining and original."

=== Awards and nominations ===
| Year | Nominee / work | Award | Result |
|---|---|---|---|
| 1981 | Patrick Dowling | BAFTA TV Award for 'Harlequin' (Drama/Light Entertainment) | Nominated |
