= Ben Slade =

British educator (born 1976)

Benjamin Rory Slade
- Born: 22 April 1976 (age 50); Newport, Wales, United Kingdom
- Education: The Institute of Directors, Royal Welsh College of Music and Drama & Cardiff Metropolitan University (joint course), Whitchurch High School
- Alma mater: Cardiff Metropolitan University Royal Welsh College of Music and Drama
- Known for: Conceiving The Prince William Award - a pioneering character and resilience award for 6 - 14 year olds; being the youngest secondary school headteacher in the United Kingdom (2007); as a former presenter of the cult children's BBC1 TV magazine show Why Don't You...? written and produced by Russell T Davies and as co-host of the comedy education podcast Ben and James Could Do Better
- Spouse: Lyndsey Hunt (m. 2018; div. 2026) Use article title or common name -->

Benjamin Rory Slade (born 22 April 1976) is a British educator.

== Early days as a BBC Children's TV presenter ==
Whilst at school in Cardiff in the 80s and 90s, Slade became the longest-serving presenter of the cult BBC 1 network children's TV magazine programme, Why Don't You? He joined the series in 1988 as a member of the Cardiff presenting team (known as "the gang") wearing his trademark flat cap. These Cardiff programmes were the first written by the celebrated TV writer Russell T. Davies. Davies used this early opportunity to weave a dramatic storyline into the various activities, games and 'makes' to make the programme more interesting and appealing and to improve its audience ratings. During the Davies and Slade era the show's audience grew from 0.9 million to 2.9 million on Children's BBC beating ITV's This Morning with Richard and Judy.

Slade's 'character' quickly became synonymous with "Why Don't You...?" and with Davies' scripts. As such, he was asked to join the Newcastle presenting team which also featured a very young Ant McPartlin in his television debut role. He subsequently appeared as a lead character/presenter in two further series with two different Liverpool "gangs" which also featured Hollyoaks star Alexandra Fletcher. These episodes were written and studio directed by Russell T. Davies who went on to write and produce Doctor Who, Torchwood, Queer as Folk, Years and Years and It's A Sin.

Davies' scripts featuring Slade as a crazy young inventor were acknowledged as his first forays into writing television drama and helped launch his writing career. Slade last appeared as a guest presenter on the final series directed by Trevor Stephenson-Long before pursuing a career in arts education and school leadership. Slade is credited as the longest-serving presenter in the cult television show's near 21-year run on network BBC 1.

Slade is adopted and hails from Cardiff where he attended Whitchurch High School. He is featured in Russell T Davies' biography: T is for Television: The Small Screen Adventures of Russell T Davies (2008). In the book Davies reveals that he had great plans for Slade and some other characters from the series in a new TV Drama. However, the casting was overruled by the then head of Children's Television, Anna Home.

Slade is a keen musician with ABRSM grade 8s in both piano and violin. He was also a member of the HTV (now ITV1 Wales) Drama Workshop where he studied acting and performance with director Peter Wooldridge alongside contemporaries Jan Anderson and Hollywood star, Ioan Gruffudd.

== Education career ==
Following graduation with a first-class honours degree and the Aneurin Davies Memorial Award for outstanding academic achievement from Cardiff Metropolitan University (a joint course with Royal Welsh College of Music and Drama) in 1998, Slade embarked on a successful career in teaching culminating in him becoming the youngest state secondary school Headteacher in the United Kingdom in 2007. On appointment, he was just 30 and had only been in teaching for 8 years.

In 2012 Slade was appointed by Sir Chris Woodhead to the role of Executive Headteacher with Cognita the largest independent school group in the UK now owned by Jacobs Holding. Slade was responsible for 8 all through schools in the UK. During this time he was also Headmaster of Quinton House School in Northampton. During his tenure GCSE results improved and the pupil roll increased significantly.

Slade has made regular contributions to both print and broadcast media on a wide range of educational issues. Furthermore, he has been involved in several pilots for Twofour and Maverick Television including "The Headmaster's Office", "The Drugs Education Show" and he narrowly missed out on being the featured headteacher and school for the original "Educating Essex" series directed by David Clews and featuring Vic Goddard and the students and staff of Passmore's Academy. He also contributed to Channel 5's "50 Greatest Kids TV Shows" (2013) and to a number of other media productions, most recently a radio documentary for BBC Radio Wales with Russell T. Davies and Tim Vincent.

== Charity chief executive ==
Slade is a Fellow of the Royal Society of Arts, the Institute of Directors, the Institute of Leadership and Management. He also holds the Institute of Directors Certificate in Company Direction and is a Chartered Fellow of the Chartered Management Institute In 2018 he was made an honorary senior research fellow of the University of Birmingham Jubilee Centre for Character and Virtues.

In 2019, the level of funding the charity received from corporate donations dropped significantly as a result of the negative impact of Brexit. As this made up more than 50% of its income, the charity sought a merger or acquisition. It closed later in 2019 when this was unsuccessful.

== The Prince William Award ==
On 1 March 2017, Prince William, Duke of Cambridge, launched The Prince William Award, Slade's brainchild developed in partnership with colleagues, Headteachers, Transforming Education, and the University of Birmingham. It was designed to be delivered by education charity SkillForce in schools across England, Scotland and Wales from September 2017, and was the first character and resilience award programme for 6- to 14-year-olds. SkillForce closed in 2019 as a result of the impact of Brexit uncertainties on corporate giving.
