= National Swedish Touring Theatre =

Swedish touring theatre company

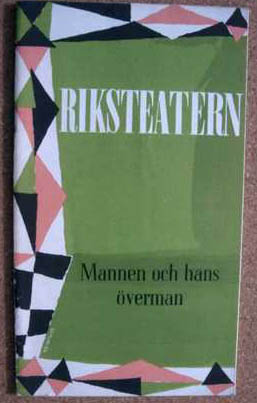
Playbill for the production of Man and Superman by George Bernard Shaw, Riksteatern, 1960

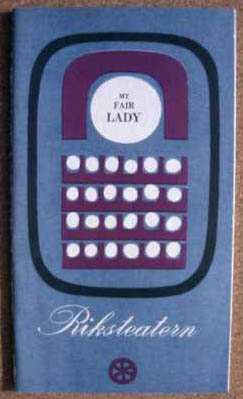
A 1959 Riksteatern playbill for a production of My Fair Lady

The National Swedish Touring Theatre (Swedish: Riksteatern) is the largest touring theatre company in Sweden. It serves as Sweden's national stage on tour. The company is owned and funded by 240 local economic associations spread throughout the country. Their main goal is to promote and produce high-quality theatre for all of Sweden, with a focus on areas outside of the major cities.

The National Swedish Touring Theatre was established in 1933 and has been touring throughout Sweden ever since. Some of Sweden's theatre companies, such as the Royal Dramatic Theatre (the national stage) and the Cullberg Ballet, frequently collaborate with the National Swedish Touring Theatre, showcasing many of their productions.

== History ==
The National Swedish Touring Theatre was established in 1933 by Arthur Engberg.

Initially, in the 1930s, the National Swedish Touring Theatre functioned as the touring branch of the Royal Dramatic Theatre in Sweden, allowing them to bring productions to audiences who were unable to attend the national stage in Stockholm. However, in the 1940s, the touring theatre was granted its own ensemble and began producing stage shows exclusively for the National Swedisch Touring Theatre, with the intention of touring throughout the country.

In 1966 the National Swedish Touring Theatre underwent corporatisation with Sweden's second influential touring theatre organisation, Svenska Teatern, to form Svenska Riksteatern. The following year, in 1967, the National Swedish Touring Theatre established a division entitled Unga Riks ("Young Riksteatern"), to produce theatre productions specifically for children and youth.

Since 1977 the theatre group Riksteatern Crea, previously known as Tyst Teater ("Silent Theatre"), has also been a prominent part of the National Swedish Touring Theatre. The group specialises in staging theatrical works for the deaf community using sign language.

In 1999, the playwright Lars Norén set up Riks Drama as a division of the National Swedish Touring Theatre. Additionally, the section of Riks Gästspel was established, which showcases guest performances by the National Swedish Touring Theatre abroad.

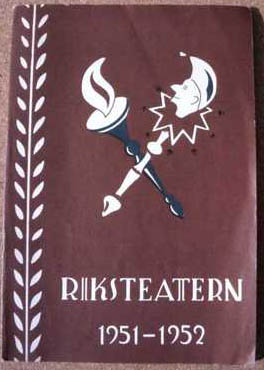
A standard National Swedish Touring Theatre playbill cover from the 1940s and 50s

== Notable productions ==
- Sörjen som blev, by Anna Takanen, directed by Mikaela Hasán (2021)
