= Morph (TV series) =

Claymation series (1977-present)

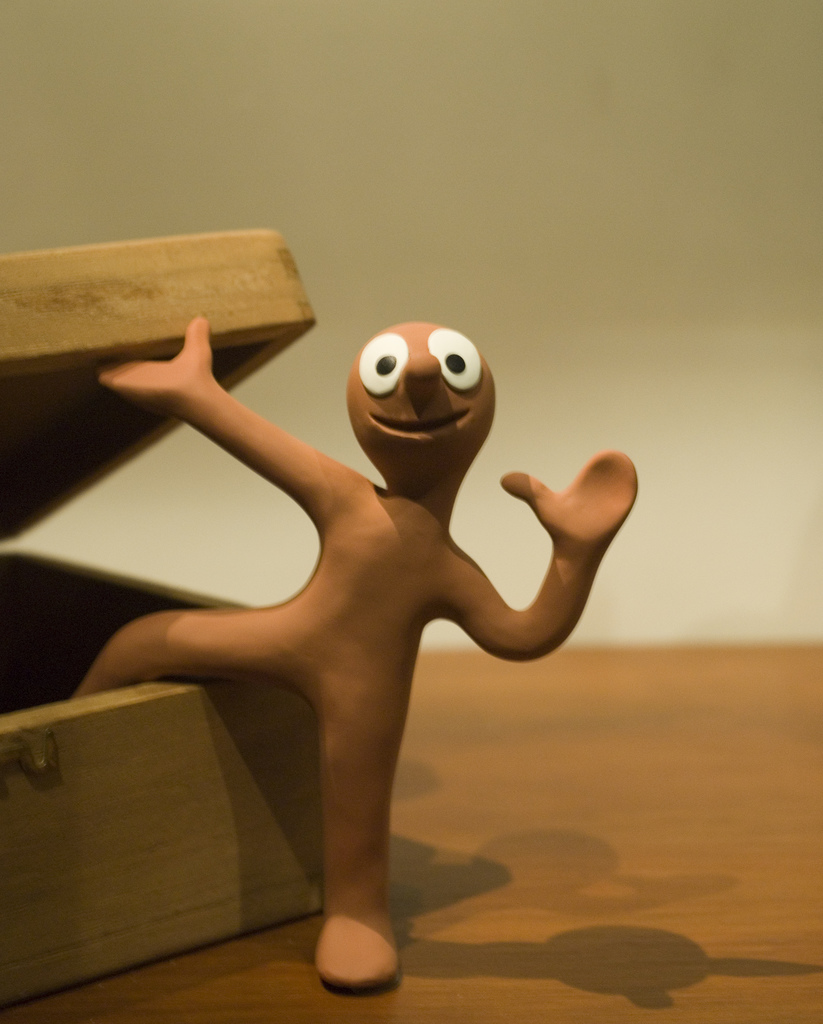
- A model of the main character, Morph, on display at the National Media Museum, Bradford
- First appearance: Take Hart (15 February 1977)
- Created by: Peter Lord; David Sproxton
- Voiced by: Peter Harwood (1977–2001); Merlin Crossingham (2014–present)

In-universe information
- Species: Terracotta clay humanoid
- Gender: Male
- Relatives: Grandmorph
- Home: Tony Hart’s tabletop
- Nationality: British
- Abilities: Shapeshifting; Floor-Phasing

Morph is a British series of clay stop-motion comedy animations, named after the main character, who is a small terracotta-skinned plasticine man, who speaks an unintelligible language and lives on a tabletop, with his bedroom being a small wooden box. Morph was initially seen interacting with Tony Hart, beginning in 1977, on several of his British television programmes, notably Take Hart, Hartbeat and SMart.

In 1980, he was given his own spin-off series, The Amazing Adventures of Morph, followed in the 1990s by The Morph Files.

== History ==
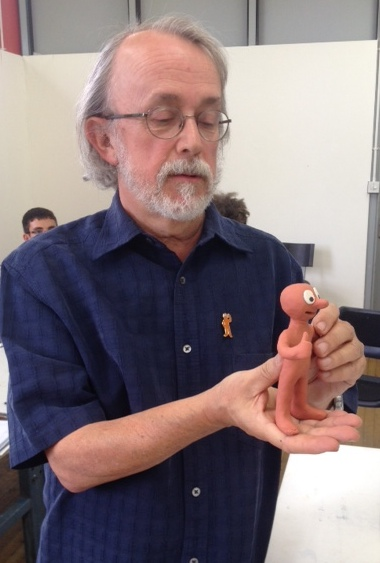
Morph with Peter Lord in 2014

Morph was produced for the BBC by Aardman Animations, later famous for the "Sledgehammer" music video, Wallace & Gromit and Shaun the Sheep. Morph appears mainly in one-minute "shorts" interspersed throughout the Take Hart show. These are connected to the main show by having Hart deliver a line or two to Morph, who replies in gibberish but with meaningful gestures. Later on, Morph is joined by the cream-coloured Chas, who is much more troublesome and mischievous.

Morph can change shape. He becomes spheres in order to move around and extrudes into cylinders to pass to different levels of his environment. He can also mimic other objects or creatures. Morph lives in a wooden microscope box on an artist's desk. He and Chas both love to eat cake, as seen in many of the shorts. Most appearances of Morph revolve around his friendship and rivalry with Chas, with each often playing tricks on the other and laughing at each other's misfortune. While Morph's nature is that of an innocent, curious character, Chas is much more mischievous and prone to bad behaviour.

After Hart's shows ended, Morph and Chas appeared in shorts on the Children's BBC's successor programme SMart from 1994-2005.

Some of the early plasticine models of Morph were destroyed in a fire at the warehouse where they were being stored on 10 October 2005.

Morph's 30th birthday was celebrated in 2007 by creator Peter Lord and celebrity fan and comedian Phill Jupitus at events for the Encounters Film Festival in Bristol. In March 2009, shortly after Hart's death, a flashmob of Morph characters was organised in London outside the Tate Modern art gallery.

In 2009, the BBC drama Ashes to Ashes featured Morph in a guest appearance as a representation of a present-day medic. Morph was used to give a comic feeling despite a very serious situation in episode 3 of the second series. The character was pictured in an episode of Take Hart; however, Morph appeared on the television after it was turned off, separating it from the context of the Take Hart episode.

On 29 October 2013, Peter Lord (co-founder of Aardman Animations), created a fundraising project on the crowdfunding site Kickstarter. The campaign set a target of £75,000 to be used to fund 12 new one-minute episodes. The target was reached on 6 November 2013 after only nine days, attracting contributions from over 1,700 backers, who received a variety of rewards, including early access to the new animations and a small box of clay used in the production, depending on the individual's level of funding. In January 2014, Peter Lord and Aardman began production on 15 new episodes featuring Morph. The new series premiered on Morph's official YouTube channel with 15 episodes from 4 July 2014 to 30 January 2015.

In 2015, a Morph experience opened at Land's End. The Land's End signpost was rebranded "Lamb's End" with original sets, models, and characters from a range of Aardman productions. Visitors were also able to star in a real Shaun the Sheep scene, using green-screen technology, and meet other characters from the Aardman family, including Shaun the Sheep and Wallace & Gromit.

Released between 20 March and 2 October 2015, HD-restored versions of The Amazing Adventures of Morph appeared on YouTube; and in the summer of 2015, Morph returned to TV on CBBC with the 15 new episodes. From 6 November 2015 to 7 January 2016, The Lost Tapes from 2001 were revealed having been redubbed and remastered on YouTube. In March 2016, it was announced that Sky had made a deal with Aardman Animations to produce new Morph material to be directed at its child audience. From 6 May 2016 to 15 September 2017, all clips captured from Take Hart were revealed on the Morph YouTube channel. In August 2017, new Morph merchandise was shown at Wallace & Gromit's Charity Shop. Between 2 March and 14 September 2018, 15 more episodes of the new Morph series that were previously shown on Sky Kids were shown on YouTube. From 15 February to 17 May 2019, all 13 episodes of The Morph Files that were remastered into HD were released on YouTube.

In May 2019, Morph and Chas appeared in an advert for Tesco as part of the company's centenary celebrations, which also featured celebrities Anneka Rice and Derrick Evans (the latter more commonly known as Mr. Motivator).

On 9 November 2020, the new Morph series, The Epic Adventures of Morph, appeared and began to stream on Sky Kids. The series features Morph, Chas, and two old characters—Delilah and GrandMorph—who were brought back to add more life to the show. There is also a very small cameo from Gillespie, who is another character from The Morph Files and The Amazing Adventures of Morph that was revived for the series.

== Films, shorts, and TV series ==
1977–83	Take Hart
1980–81	The Amazing Adventures of Morph
1984–93	Hartbeat
1994–2005	SMart
1996	The Morph Files
1997	Morph TV (with Tony Hart)
1998	On Your Marks
2001	The Lost Tapes
2006	Morph (series of restored shorts)
2009	Ashes to Ashes (guest appearance)
2012	Ricky's Radical Reinventions
2014–2019	Morph
2019	Retro Morph
2020	The Epic Adventures of Morph
2021–present	The Very Small Creatures (Opening)

=== Series overview ===
Series	Episodes		
Series	Episodes	First aired	Last aired
Original episodes	44	2006	2006
1	17	4 July 2014	6 March 2015
2	15	2016	2016

==== Original episodes (2006) ====
The original 43 episodes of Morph were originally produced on the Aardman website in 2006. Subsequently, they were re-used on Aardman's YouTube channel from around September 2008 until 2010, and Morph's YouTube channel from 4 November 2013 until 23 October 2015. The original episodes uses the same clips originally used from Take Hart, The Amazing Adventures of Morph, Hartbeat, SMart and The Morph Files.

#	Episode	Original airdate
101 (1)	Hats	2006
102 (2)	No Entry	2006
103 (3)	Magic Boots	2006
104 (4)	Invisimorph	2006
105 (5)	Sweet Showdown	2006
106 (6)	The Amazing Mimic	2006
107 (7)	Get The Picture	2006
108 (8)	Cake	2006
109 (9)	Robomorph	2006
110 (10)	Messy April Fools	2006
111 (11)	Card Trick	2006
112 (12)	Ice Cream	2006
113 (13)	Row Your Boat	2006
114 (14)	Sailors	2006
115 (15)	Cleaning	2006
116 (16)	Minimorph	2006
117 (17)	Football	2006
118 (18)	Sitting Comfortably?	2006
119 (19)	Pudding Time	2006
120 (20)	Blancmange	2006
121 (21)	Self Portrait	2006
122 (22)	Sculpture	2006
123 (23)	Bed Time	2006
124 (24)	Paint Job	2006
125 (25)	Toll Bridge	2006
126 (26)	Invisidog	2006
127 (27)	Morph Off	2006
128 (28)	Pop	2006
129 (29)	Still Life	2006
130 (30)	Poser	2006
131 (31)	Abominable Snowman	2006
132 (32)	Dog Show	2006
133 (33)	Cowboys	2006
134 (34)	Sharpshooter/Silver Disc Shooting	2006
135 (35)	Dinner Time	2006
136 (36)	Sea Shell/Rock and Roll Hole	2006
137 (37)	Hide and Seek	2006
138 (38)	Strong Morph	2006
139 (39)	Sticky	2006
140 (40)	The Painters	2006
141 (41)	Cheese	2006
142 (42)	Washing Machine	2006
143 (43)	Bake Off	2006

==== Series 1: 2014–2015 ====
The first series of Morph (referred to in YouTube video titles as Brand New Morph) was released on YouTube from 4 July 2014 to 30 January 2015 with a Red Nose Day special being released on 6 March. The series also aired on CBBC throughout the summer of 2015. It was later released on Sky Kids, albeit in a different order.

#	Episode	Original airdate
201 (20)	Twin Decks	4 July 2014
202 (21)	Portable Hole	18 July 2014
203 (22)	Great Outdoors	1 August 2014
204 (23)	Stand Up	15 August 2014
205 (24)	Fetch	29 August 2014
206 (25)	Bin It To Win It	12 September 2014
207 (26)	Stick Up	26 September 2014
208 (27)	Hiccups	10 October 2014
209 (28)	Box of Tricks	24 October 2014
210 (29)	Selfie	7 November 2014
211 (30)	Clean Sweep	21 November 2014
212 (31)	Goal	5 December 2014
213 (32)	Xmas	19 December 2014
214 (33)	Sloped World	2 January 2015
215 (34)	Chas Express	17 January 2015
216 (35)	Picture Perfect	30 January 2015
217 (36)	Red Nose Day	6 March 2015

==== Series 2: 2016 ====
The second series of Morph released on Sky Kids in 2016 and then YouTube from 2 March 2018 until 14 September 2018, albeit in a different order. It is the first series produced for Sky Kids, which also streamed the first two series of Morph on Sky TV.

#	Episode	Original airdate
301 (37)	Portable Portals	2016
302 (38)	Desktop Rodeo	2016
303 (39)	Remote	2016
304 (40)	Shadow Puppets	2016
305 (41)	Piñata	2016
306 (42)	Treasure Map	2016
307 (43)	One Man and His Dog	2016
308 (44)	Lamp	2016
309 (45)	Phosing	2016
310 (46)	New Neighbour	2016
311 (47)	Magic Doors	2016
312 (48)	Birthday Party	2016
313 (49)	Tablet	2016
314 (50)	Rapper’s Delight	2016
315 (51)	Boot Camp	2016

==== Series 3: 2019 ====
The third series of Morph premiered on Sky Kids in 2019 and to YouTube on 12 February 2021 until 31 December 2021, with the episodes taking place during some special events that occurred during the year. Though it is said to be Series 3 on YouTube, it was released as separate specials on Sky Kids.

#	Episode	Original airdate
316 (52)	Valentine's Day	2019
317 (53)	Pancake Day	2019
318 (54)	World Book Day	2019
319 (55)	Easter	2019
320 (56)	Beached	2019
321 (57)	Back To School	2019
322 (58)	Halloween	2019
323 (59)	Fireworks	2019
324 (60)	Christmas	2019
325 (61)	New Year	2019

==== The Epic Adventures of Morph: 2020 ====
The first ten episodes of The Epic Adventures of Morph premiered on Sky Kids on November 9, 2020, with the series re-released on YouTube between 1 April 2022 and 8 July 2022. The episodes' running time was also extended to five minutes. Delilah, Grandmorph and The Very Small Creatures, who were originally from The Amazing Adventures of Morph, returned as main characters in the series and Gillespie made a cameo in 'Beanstalk'. Folly and Gobbledegook, who were also characters from said series, did not appear in the series.

#	Episode	Original airdate
326 (62)	Tangled Web	November 9, 2020
327 (63)	Pie Spy	November 9, 2020
328 (64)	Chas Air	November 9, 2020
329 (65)	Medieval Morph	November 9, 2020
330 (66)	Size Matters	November 9, 2020
331 (67)	Daredevil Delilah	November 9, 2020
332 (68)	Finding Nailbrush	November 9, 2020
333 (69)	Double Trouble	November 9, 2020
334 (70)	Camping Caper	November 9, 2020
335 (71)	Beanstalk	November 9, 2020
336 (72)	Operation Sausage	2020
337 (73)	Dollshouse	2020
338 (74)	Rainy Day	2020
339 (75)	Game On!	2020
340 (76)	Cheesed Off	2020

== Characters ==
=== Main ===
- Morph – The protagonist with terracotta skin. He is a clay figure who can transform into many things. He is very clever, curious and creative, and has a good sense of humour.
- Chas – Morph's cream-coloured best friend. Unlike Morph, he can't change shape. He is amoral, narcissistic, and dimwitted but has a good friendship with Morph, although this doesn’t stop him playing tricks on him at times. Chas was originally named Stu.
- Nailbrush – Morph's 'canine' companion, a barking, male nailbrush, thinking he's a dog. He is very loyal to Morph, although he sometimes gets him into trouble.

=== Supporting ===
- Grandmorph – Morph's elderly, bearded grandfather, who travels by skateboard and frequently invents things. Although wise and kind-hearted, Grandmorph is very strict, and often punishes Morph and Chas when they misbehave.
- Delilah – A bossy, bespectacled female character in a yellow dress with dark brown skin. She has a good relationship with Morph, although she gets in his way.
- Folly – A scatter-brained girl made of tin foil.
- Gillespie – A large, blue friend of Morph's. He is very clueless and silly but is peaceable and often meditates.
- The Very Small Creatures – An array of small plasticine balls with eyes who travel in a swarm; the smallest of the group, Little Green, features prominently on his own in a number of episodes.
- Gobbledygook – A green, omnivorous alien child (who arrived on the table by sleeping near Morph's box in The Amazing Adventures of Morph, but in The Morph Files, he arrived by mistakenly being printed from a 'Space Invaders' style game).
- The Paint Pots – A group of sentient paint pots who can morph their paint into facsimiles of people; unlike Morph and Chas, they are able to speak coherently (one of them even chides Morph for his non-existent linguistic skills on multiple occasions); they only appear in Take Hart.
- Luxo the Lamp – A Luxo lamp who warns the others when Tony is entering the room; like the Paint Pots, it only appears in Take Hart, but later reappeared in a 2018 short in a silent role more akin to Luxo Jr.

== See also ==
- Gumby
- Davey and Goliath
- Pingu
- Wallace & Gromit
- Shaun the Sheep
- Creature Comforts
- Cartoon Network (Japan)
- Pogo (TV channel)
- The Trap Door
- Plonsters
