= See Hear =

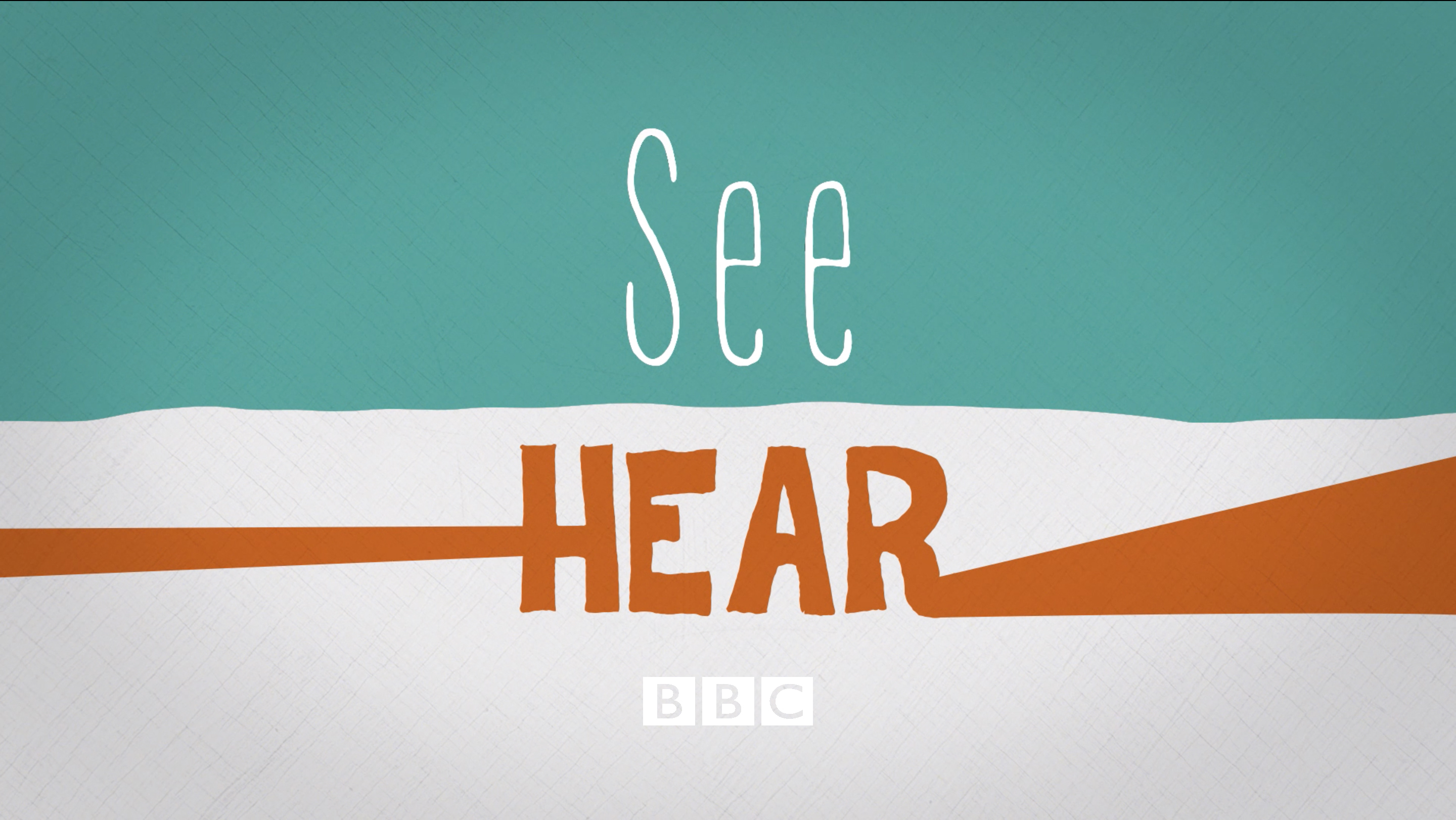
- See Hear logo since Series 40 (2020–21)
- Starring: Clive Mason; Memnos Costi; Radha Manjeshwar
- Country of origin: United Kingdom
- Original language: English (hard-of-hearing only)
- No. of series: 43

Production
- Running time: 30 minutes
- Production company: BBC Studios

Original release
- Network: BBC Two
- Release: 11 October 1981 – present

See Hear is a monthly magazine programme for deaf and hard-of-hearing people in the United Kingdom, broadcast on BBC Two at various times of the year currently at 1pm. The programme focuses on the British and the worldwide deaf community and covers a broad range of topics from areas such as education, deaf people's rights, technology and language.

The programme is presented entirely in BSL and is broadcast with voice-over (until Series 43) and subtitles in English. This allows both deaf and hearing people (who may be learning sign language) to understand the programme. See Hear is currently the thirty-second longest-running BBC programme.

== History ==
=== 1980s ===
See Hear was launched on BBC1 on 11 October 1981, initially as a series of 20 programmes. It was broadcast with open subtitles, and was presented in sign by Martin Colville, a hearing CODA, and a Deaf presenter Maggie Woolley. The programme was originally broadcast at lunchtime on Sundays. As the series went from strength to strength different topics, such as discussions, chat shows, and special editions focussing on technology and education for Deaf people were added that ran alongside the original magazine. Some of the other early presenters included: Wendy Daunt, Gerry Hughes, Gloria Pullen and Mika Broje.

Over the years, See Hear's appeal within the Deaf community increased, and with it the involvement of Clive Mason, the series' longest serving presenter who joined in 1984. Clive was prominently involved with the See Hear Christmas and pantomime specials written by Terry Ruane and the late Dorothy Miles, two deaf people with strong backgrounds in Theatre. By the late 1980s the show was focussed on the important issues and concerns of members of the Deaf community and by 1987, the programme was BSL-presented. As the show's popularity grew more Deaf staff were recruited to work on the show, both behind the scenes as well as in front of the camera. As the show neared its 10th anniversary, the BBC, along with other Deaf organisations felt that it needed a change to keep it fresh.

See Hear took a brief hiatus from broadcast, while the format of the show was revamped. The new format had a broader scope than the previous one, because the producers felt that Deaf people were interested in different activities and experiences outside of their own community. When See Hear was broadcast following the new format the audience almost doubled. The new format was a success, and with this the BBC recognised BSL as a language.

=== 1990s ===
From 5 February 1990, a recorded version of the BBC Breakfast News 7.00am bulletin from BBC One was shown on BBC Two for 15 minutes from 8.00 am – 8.15 am with sign language and subtitles under the name as simply Breakfast News. From 9 October 1995, it moved to 7.00am which was a simulcast with BBC One, with Children's BBC following at 7.15am. By February 1996, Children's BBC began at 7.30 am with Breakfast News starting at 7.15am instead of 7.00am, now branded See Hear Breakfast News in the programme schedules, Starting on 6 October 1997 the programme returned to its 7:00am slot from 1995, with CBBC beginning at 7.15am. This practice stopped in April 1998, thus, the weekday CBBC block began on BBC Two full time from 7.00am. Sign language on Breakfast continues to appear from 7.00 am onwards on BBC News.

During the late 1990s, See Hear was moved from the Sunday lunchtime slot to the Saturday morning slot. At this time the show was once again revamped, with new titles and music created for it. The show was also moved to the Light House in Wolverhampton and new presenter Lara Crooks joined the staff. It was renamed See Hear on Saturday. Since the time of this revamp, the show has constantly upgraded itself to keep up with the changes within the deaf community.

=== 2000s ===
In 2001, See Hear celebrated its 20th anniversary with three new TV projects: Switch, a drama series that revolved around the lives and relationships of people in the deaf community; The House on the Hill for young Deaf children, written by viewer Amy Possart and presented by Lesley McGilp and Julian Peedle-Calloo, and Hay's Way, showcasing the history of various cities around the UK through deaf academic and historian John Hay's visits.

Five years later, See Hear celebrated its 25th anniversary with a retrospective of See Hear's 25-year history. In October, coinciding with the 25th anniversary, See Hear switched from open subtitles, in use since 1981, to closed subtitles, which has to be activated for subtitles to appear on screen.

At the end of the 2006–2007 series, it was announced that See Hear would move its usual broadcast day from Saturday to Wednesday.

=== 2010s ===
As of January 2013, See Hear typically airs on BBC Two on the first Wednesday of every month at around 8:00am, although this schedule would sometimes be altered if any events occur in the schedule (e.g. Christmas & New Year). Yvonne Cobb was a presenter from 2017 to 2025, and she’s now a presenter for BBC Morning Live, being the only Deaf BSL presenter on mainstream TV on a regular basis.

William Mager was appointed to produce the 33rd series in July 2013, which makes him See Hear's first deaf series producer since Terry Riley's departure in 2008. The following year, the 34th series was commissioned to be aired weekly until March 2015.

=== 2020s ===
In June 2023, the BBC announced that the programme, alongside DIY SOS would be put up for tender as part of the broadcaster's competitive tender policy.
