= Take Hart =

British children's TV art series (1977–1983)

- Final title card, used from 1982 to 1983
- Starring: Tony Hart
- Opening theme: "Left Bank Two" by the Noveltones (1977–1982) "Passion Punch" by Stanley Myers (1982–1983)
- Ending theme: "Cavatina" by John Williams
- Country of origin: United Kingdom
- Original language: English
- No. of series: 8
- No. of episodes: 102

Production
- Running time: 30mins (Special: 60mins)

Original release
- Network: BBC1
- Release: 15 February 1977 – 30 December 1983

Related
- Vision On; The Amazing Adventures of Morph; Hartbeat

Take Hart is a British children's television programme about art presented by Tony Hart. It took over from Vision On, and ran from 1977 until 1983.

== Format ==
The programme featured Hart and the animated Plasticine character Morph, and other characters created by David Sproxton like 'Smoulder the Moulder', which was a lump of mould which would create props by 'spraying' them out of a spray can. The only other human to appear on a regular basis was Mr. Bennett, the caretaker, played by Colin Bennett. The programme won a BAFTA award for Hart in 1984.

As well as demonstrating small-scale projects (the type that viewers might be able to do), Hart also created large-scale artworks on the TV studio floor and even used beaches and other open spaces as 'canvases' (to be viewed from a camera-crane). This idea was later adopted by Art Attack, which began in 1990.

A regular feature of the programme was 'The Gallery', which displayed artworks sent in by young viewers. The easy-listening vibraphone music accompanying this feature – "Left Bank Two", composed by Wayne Hill – has passed into British TV musical lore. In later series, "Left Bank Two" alternated with John Williams' recording of Stanley Myers' "Cavatina", and in the final three series, the theme music was replaced by the more reggae-like "Passion Punch", also composed by Myers, and The Gallery music was replaced by "Marguerite", by Bob Morgan, which is also well-remembered by many viewers.

== Demise ==
By the end of the eighth series in December 1983, Hart felt that the format of the programme, which essentially continued with much of the format of its predecessor Vision On, had become somewhat outdated and routine. Despite the award of a BAFTA in early 1984, viewing figures for Take Hart by 1983 had gradually fallen since the series' heyday in the late 1970s. In an attempt to update the image of the series, Take Hart was dropped in December 1983, and replaced by the more popular series Hartbeat.

== Series guide ==
- Series 1: 13 editions first shown 15 February 1977 – 17 May 1977
- Series 2: 6 editions first shown 14 March 1978 – 18 April 1978
- Series 3: 13 editions first shown 3 January 1979 – 28 March 1979
- Series 4: 13 editions first shown 2 January 1980 – 26 March 1980
- Series 5: 15 editions first shown 14 January 1981 – 22 April 1981
- Special: Take Hart on Holiday By the Sea, first shown 12 June 1981
- Series 6: 15 editions first shown 6 January 1982 – 14 April 1982
- Series 7 15 editions first shown 5 January 1983 – 13 April 1983
- Series 8: 10 editions first shown 28 October 1983 – 30 December 1983
