= Ursula Eason =

British radio broadcaster and television producer (1910–1993)

Ursula Vernon Eason
- Born: 19 August 1910; Streatham, London, England
- Died: 25 December 1993 (aged 83)
- Education: Mount Nod School, Streatham; University College London
- Occupations: Radio broadcaster; Television producer
- Employer: BBC
- Known for: Television programmes for deaf children

Ursula Vernon Eason (19 August 1910 – 25 December 1993) was a BBC radio broadcaster, television producer and administrator, and a pioneer of television programmes for deaf children in the 1950s and '60s.

Eason joined the BBC in 1933 as the Children's Hour organiser in Belfast, a position she held for 18 years, becoming one of the "radio aunties". (Note: "From its outset the programme Children's Hour created by 'fiat' an extended family of its staff, who were initially reluctant performers of a radio family unity ... the BBC staff had to reconcile themselves to becoming uncles and aunts not only to children but to some extent at least to the public as a whole.") She was transferred to BBC television in London in 1952, and subsequently appointed Assistant Head of Children's Programmes under Freda Lingstrom. Hearing-impaired herself, Eason insisted that programmes for deaf children made use of signing. She also transformed a series of five-minute children's programmes the BBC had acquired from France into what became a cult classic, The Magic Roundabout.

== Early life ==
Ursula Eason was born on 19 August 1910 in Streatham, London, the fifth of six children born to auctioneer and surveyor Edward Eason and his wife Aisling, also known as Nancy, née Bruton. She attended the Mount Nod School in Streatham, followed by University College London, from where she graduated with a degree in English. After completing a secretarial course she spent nine months working as a secretary to the assistant manager of The Times Book Club. Her long-standing interest in theatre and acting prompted Eason to apply for a position at the BBC in 1934, where she was interviewed by John Reith. A report of the interview describes Eason as "a practical, sensible, nice-looking 23-year-old."

== BBC career ==
Eason accepted the BBC's offer of a position as Children's Hour organiser in Belfast, where she remained for 18 years. She became a producer and head of the Children's Hour unit, taking part in programmes herself as Auntie Phoebe. (Note: Eason was advised that her own first name was too sibilant for radio, and so chose the name of her youngest sister.) During the Second World War, when many of the BBC's male staff were absent on military service, she was responsible for the entire output from BBC Northern Ireland. She was transferred to BBC television in London in 1952, and the following year was appointed a junior producer of children's programmes. In 1955 she became Assistant Head of Children's Programmes under Freda Lingstrom. Her two "outstanding contributions" in that role were to pioneer programmes for deaf children, and to transform a "charming" but rather pedestrian series of five-minute programmes acquired from France into what became a cult classic, The Magic Roundabout, as popular with adults as it was with young children.

Hearing-impaired herself, Eason's first programme for deaf children, the monthly For Deaf Children, was developed in collaboration with Roy Cole of the Royal National Institute for the Deaf (RNID) in 1953. Her significant breakthrough came in 1964 with Vision On, which instead of ghettoising the deaf was designed to appeal to all children, with its emphasis on the visual arts such as mime, painting and drawing. Supported by the RNID and the National Deaf Children's Society, Eason insisted that the programme made use of signing, even though it was then unpopular with many teachers of the deaf.

== Later life ==
Eason never married, and retired from the BBC in 1970. She subsequently travelled all over the UK championing the RNID. Affected by the onset of Alzheimer's in her mid-70s, she was initially cared for by her sister Phoebe and her niece Ann, until she eventually had to give up her home in Kew Green and enter a nursing home. Eason died on 25 December 1993 and was cremated at Mortlake.
