= Tony Hart =

English artist and TV presenter (1925–2009)

- Born: Norman Antony Hart; 15 October 1925; Maidstone, Kent, England
- Died: 18 January 2009 (aged 83); Shamley Green, Surrey, England
- Resting place: Christ Church, Shamley Green, Surrey, England
- Occupations: Artist; television presenter
- Years active: 1952–2001
- Spouse: Jean Skingle (m. 1953; died 2003)
- Children: 1
- Website: tonyhart.co.uk

Norman Antony Hart (15 October 1925 – 18 January 2009) was an English artist best known for his work in educating children in art through his role as a children's television presenter.

Hart initially served as an officer in a Gurkha regiment until the start of Indian independence. After this he became involved in children's television from the 1950s, working on the BBC's Blue Peter for a few years before fronting a series of children's art programmes, including Vision On, Take Hart and Hartbeat.

Hart's contributions to children's television include the design of the ship logo used by Blue Peter and the show's badges, and the animated character of Morph, who appeared beside him on his programmes following his introduction in the 1970s.

== Early life ==
Tony Hart was born in Hastings Road, Maidstone in Kent. He was interested in drawing from an early age. He attended All Saints, Margaret Street Resident Choir School and then Clayesmore School in Iwerne Minster, Dorset, where art was his best subject.

== Military service ==
Hart left school in 1943 and wanted to join the Royal Air Force, but as he would have been unable to fly owing to slightly deficient eyesight, he followed in his father's footsteps and joined the British Indian Army instead where he gained an officer's commission in the 1st Gurkha Rifles, serving from 1943 to 1947. His military career was cut short, however, when he was told that lower-ranked British officers would be replaced by Indian officers following Indian independence, so he decided to return to civilian life. The outbreak of the Korean War (25 June 1950) saw him being recommissioned in the Territorial Army, attached to the Royal Artillery, from 23 November 1948 to 1 July 1950.

== Career ==
After being demobilised, Hart decided to become a professional artist and studied at Maidstone College of Art, which later became Kent Institute of Art & Design (and is now the Maidstone campus of the University for the Creative Arts). He graduated in 1950 and, after working as a display artist in a London store, became a freelance artist.

Hart's break into broadcast television came in 1952, after his brother persuaded him to attend a party where he met a BBC children's television producer. After an interview in which Hart drew a fish on a napkin while the producer was looking for paper, Hart became resident artist on the Saturday Special programme. Subsequent television shows included Playbox (1954–59), Tich and Quackers (1963-), Vision On (1964–76), Take Hart (1977–83), Hartbeat (1984–93), Artbox Bunch (1995–96) and Smart Hart (1999–2000). From the 1970s, he often appeared alongside the animated Plasticine stop-motion character Morph, created by Peter Lord of Aardman Animations.

Hart was a regular face on the BBC children's programme Blue Peter in the 1950s and presented a number of programmes in 1959. Richard Marson's book Blue Peter: Inside the Archives lists Hart as a presenter in November 1959 but he is not officially listed as a host. As well as demonstrating small-scale projects (the type that viewers might be able to do) Hart also created large-scale artworks on the television studio floor, and even used beaches and other open spaces as 'canvases'.

A regular feature of Hart's programmes was The Gallery, which displayed artworks (paintings, drawings and collages) sent in by young viewers. One of the pieces of easy-listening vibraphone music accompanying this feature—"Left Bank Two", composed by Wayne Hill and performed by The Noveltones—has passed into British TV theme lore. This was first introduced in the show Vision On.

Hart also created the original design for the Blue Peter badge, also used as the programme's logo. He originally asked for his fee to be paid as a royalty of 1d (one pre-decimalisation penny) for each badge made, but was offered a flat fee of £100 (equivalent to £3,061.58 at January 2020 rates). The badges are famous throughout the United Kingdom and have been coveted by successive generations of Blue Peter viewers. The ink and watercolour galleon, believed to be the inspiration for the Blue Peter logo and badge, was originally drawn by Hart for "Hooray for Humpty-Dumpty" on Saturday Special, in 1952.

Hart received two BAFTA awards. His first, for Best Children's Educational Programme, came in 1984 for Take Hart, and he was given a Lifetime Achievement Award in 1998. He retired from regular TV work in 2001.

== Personal life ==
Hart met his wife, Jean Skingle, while working in television; they married in 1953. They were married for fifty years until she died in 2003. They had a daughter together.

== Death ==
On 28 December 2006, it was announced during the reunion programme It Started with Swap Shop that Hart was in poor health, though this was not elaborated upon until an interview with The Times published on 30 September 2008, revealing that two strokes had robbed him of the use of his hands and left him unable to draw. He described this as "the greatest cross I have to bear". Hart died peacefully on 18 January 2009 at the age of 83.

Hart's funeral took place in the village of Shamley Green, where he had lived for more than forty years and he was buried in the churchyard of Christ Church.

=== Tributes ===
On 1 March 2009 a flash mob, organised through Facebook, paid tribute to Hart with around two hundred Morph figures displayed outside the Tate Modern art gallery. Hart's daughter, Carolyn Ross, attended and judged the "Best Morph in Show".

A memorial plaque is displayed in Hart's birthplace, the town of Maidstone, where he studied art at the town's art college. The plaque was unveiled by his daughter in May 2009 at the Hazlitt Arts Centre.

In September 2010 Tony Hart: A Portrait of My Dad, an affectionate biography of Hart by his daughter Carolyn, was published by John Blake Publishing.

In February 2015 a wave of tributes (followed by corrections) appeared on social media sites over a period of two days, when an individual mistakenly read a 2009 report of Hart's death and, missing the dateline, published it as news on Facebook, from which it was later transferred to Twitter. Many social media posters hyperlinked to an article in The Guardian. The newspaper published a graph of the number of readers referred to its article for the period. Aardman Animations used its Twitter account, in the name of Morph, to point to a tribute to Hart (a portrait of him being hung on a wall) that was included in the last episode of its forthcoming new set of episodes for the Morph television series.

In August 2021, a mural at Maidstone bus station was created, featuring Tony Hart and his sidekick Morph.

== Legacy ==
In 2021 a collection of Hart's drawings from the estate of his agent were put up for auction. The collection, which included a sketch of a galleon, created for the 1952 Humpty Dumpty story and subsequently used by Hart as the basis for the Blue Peter logo, was thought likely to sell for around £20,000. The 65-lot auction took place on 29 January.
