= List of space pirates =

Science fiction character trope of space, rather than seafaring pirate

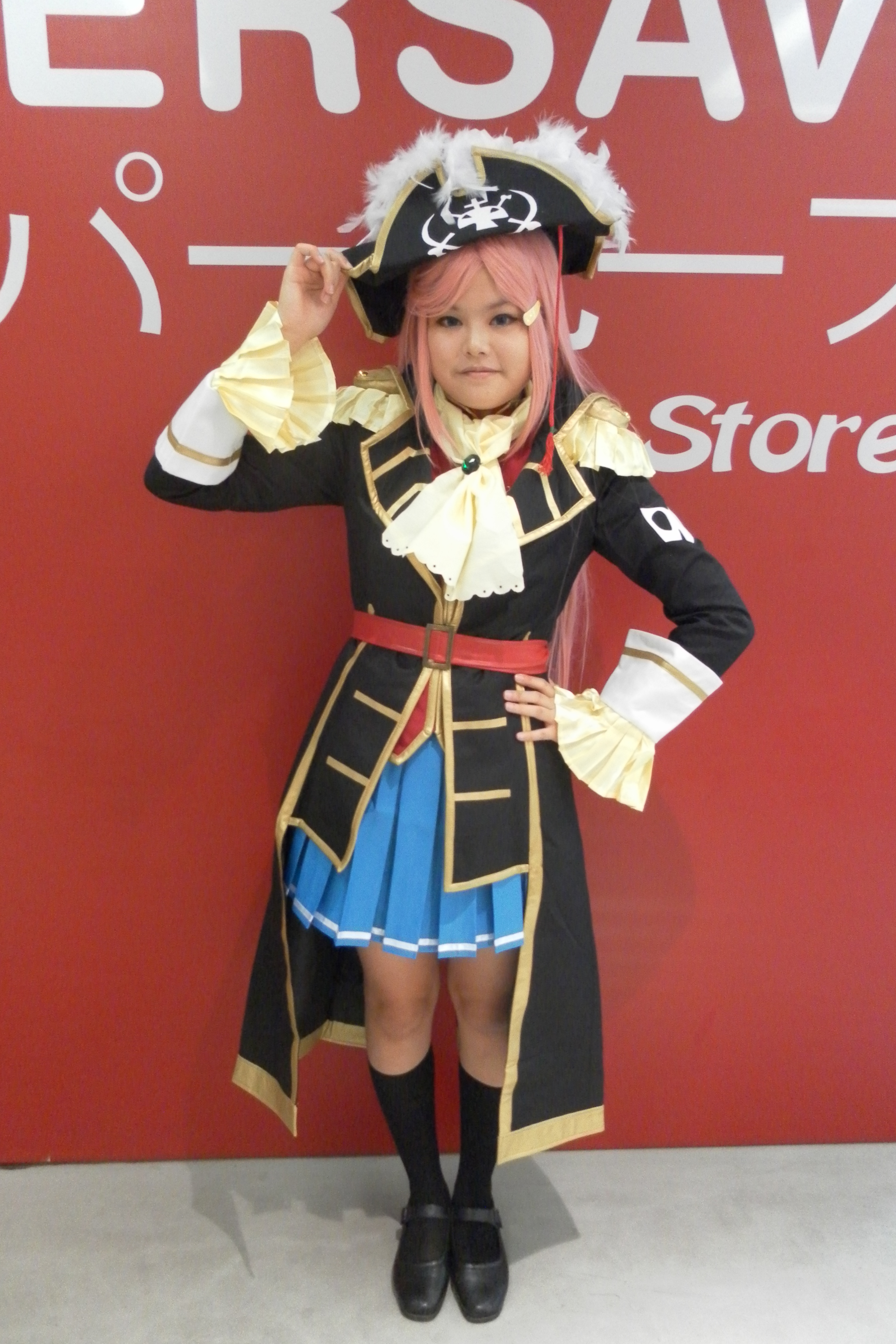
A child cosplaying herself as Captain Marika Kato from Bodacious Space Pirates at a 2013 Cosplay Mart

Space pirates are a type of stock character from space opera and soft science fiction. The archetype evolved from the air pirate trope popular from the turn of the century until the 1920s. By the 1930s, space pirates were recurring villains in the Buck Rogers comic strip. Like historical sea pirates, space pirates may be involved in slaving or smuggling in addition to raiding spacecraft and settlements.

The names are organized alphabetically by surname, or by single name if the character does not have a surname. If more than two characters are in one entry, the last name of the first character is used.

== Animation ==
Name	Work	Duration	Description
Amsaja	Cleopatra in Space	2020–present	The self-declared "Queen of the Space Pirates," who heads a crew of three other pirates (Ostea, Cyborg Dwayne, and Boop), and the doppelgänger of series protagonist, Cleopatra. She previously had the telepathic space shark ninja as her ex-boyfriend, and the series villain, Octavian, might be her ex-boyfriend as well.
Atomsk	FLCL	2000-2001	Pirate King in this OVA, who also appears in the manga, and two anime series, FLCL Progressive and FLCL Alternative.
Ryoko Balta	Tenchi Muyo! GXP	2002	Although she named herself after Ryoko Hakubi, Balta is hardly as bloodthirsty as that infamous space pirate was rumored to be, although she is notorious. Even though she was a member of the dreaded Daluma pirate guild, Ryoko Balta is an educated and cultured pirate. She is well-versed in many customs from other planets, including the Japanese Tea Ceremony.
Lars Barriga	Steven Universe; Steven Universe Future	2013-2019; 2019-2020	A human who died on the Gem Homeworld and was resurrected by Steven, later becoming the captain of a group of fugitive gems on a stolen spaceship. He has been described as "complicated fellow" by his voice actor, Matthew Moy, and was designed by series creator Rebecca Sugar when she was in college. Some have said that the outfit Lars wears is reminiscent of Captain Harlock. He is also set to return in the spinoff series Steven Universe: Lars of the Stars.
Boop	Cleopatra in Space	2020–present	She is a doppelgänger of Mihos, Cleo's animal companion. She is on the pirate ship along with Cyborg Dwayne, Amsaja, and Ostea. His attack cry is just saying her name over and over.
Brak	Space Ghost; Space Ghost Coast to Coast	1966-1967; 1994-2008	A supervillain who is portrayed as a catlike alien space pirate trying to conquer the galaxy. Cartoon Network described him as having "meager wits and the love of a peppy tune."
Captain Cracker	ThunderCats; ThunderCats Roar	1985-1989; 2020–present	A robotic space pirate who has a robot parrot which sits on his shoulder.
Cyborg Dwayne	Cleopatra in Space	2020–present	The doppelgänger of protagonist Brian Bell who is also on the pirate ship with Ostea, Boop, and Amsaja.
Spectre; Gabbro; Foolscap; Shear; Goma	Ancient Ruler Dinosaur King DKidz Adventure	2007-2008	Spectre, Gabbro, Foolscap, Shear, and Goma are members of the “Spectral Space Pirates” and collect cosmos stones throughout time.
Hammerhand	ThunderCats; ThunderCats Roar	1985-1989; 2020–present	The leader of the Berserkers who has a cybernetic arm that can punch and pound with great force. After he and his original Berserkers were killed, Hammerhand was later mystically resurrected by Mumm-Ra who summoned up his spirit to animate a clone of Panthro which he had created. When the plan failed, Hammerhand's spirit broke Mumm-Ra's control and the clone body shifted into Hammerhand's original form before departing. Other Berserkers are Topspinner, Ram Bam, and Cruncher, all of whom are "gold-loving" pirates and all cyborgs.
Captain Harlock	Space Pirate Captain Harlock	1978-1979	Captain of the Arcadia. The character was created by Leiji Matsumoto in 1977 and popularized in the 1978 television series Space Pirate Captain Harlock. Since then, the character has appeared in numerous animated television series and films, like Arcadia of My Youth, the latest of which is 2013's Space Pirate Captain Harlock. Harlock has achieved notable popularity. Several anime and manga characters have been, in some way, inspired by Matsumoto's creation. Naoko Takeuchi drew inspiration from Harlock's stoic qualities ("strong, silent, unshakeable") when designing the character of Tuxedo Mask, while Last Exile's Alex Row was modeled after the Captain. His basic character design is even thought to be a source of inspiration for Osamu Tezuka's manga character Black Jack.
Marika Kato	Bodacious Space Pirates (Note: Also known as Miniskirt Space Pirates)	2012	In the far future where space travel is the norm, Marika Kato, born and raised in the Tau Ceti planet Morningstar, is the newly recruited teenage captain of the space pirate ship Bentenmaru, inheriting the title from her deceased father. Apart from the anime series, she appeared in the manga series of the same name, and the 2014 film, Bodacious Space Pirates: Abyss of Hyperspace.
Ririka Kato	Bodacious Space Pirates	2012	She is the mother of Marika, the captain of the Bentenmaru, and wife of Gonzaemon Kato (otherwise known as Captain Ironbeard), the captain of the Parabellum pirate ship, and was once a space pirate known as "Blaster Ririka". Sometime after Marika becomes the captain of the Bentenmaru, she joins the crew of the Parabellum.
Duelo McFile	Vandread	2000-2001	Duelo quickly takes over medical emergencies often at the objection of the female pirates, but ignores them, assuring the crew members that he is not a threat. Since he is the only licensed medical practitioner on board the Nirvana, as well as being that the medical facilities on board the female pirate ship were no longer operational, the female pirates were left with no choice but to have him as their official doctor.
Mito	Space Pirate Mito	1999	Mito masquerades as a fashion model, but is actually a legendary space pirate.
Hondo Ohnaka	Star Wars: The Clone Wars; Star Wars Rebels	2008-2020; 2014-2018	Leader of the Weequay space pirates, (Note: He was also called a "sassy space pirate" by Robert Nairne, who voiced him in a Disneyland display.) known as the Ohnaka Gang, which kidnaps, and attempts to ransom, Obi-Wan Kenobi, Anakin Skywalker, Count Dooku—and later Ahsoka Tano—to the highest bidder during the Clone Wars. He follows a code of honor and respects the Jedi, but is not above using sneaky tactics and treachery if it is for "good business". Years after the Clone Wars, despite losing his crew to the Galactic Empire, Hondo continues his criminal activities while having dealings with the Rebellion crew of the Ghost. He also rebuilt the Slave I ship, which Boba Fett took control of following his father's death, and Boba Fett kept it for years onward.
Orions	Star Trek: The Animated Series	1973-1974	The first appearance of a male Orion was shown in the Star Trek: The Animated Series episode "The Pirates of Orion". In the episode, these Orions are shown to be ruthless pirates, As such, some recommended this episode for featuring the trio of characters Kirk, Spock, and Bones of The Original Series. Later, the Orion Syndicate was mentioned in Star Trek: Deep Space Nine, but no actual Orions were seen, only members of other species.
Ostea	Cleopatra in Space	2020–present	A doppelgänger of series protagonist Akila Theoris, she is a pirate in the same crew as Cyborg Dwayne and Amsaja. She is a pirate who apparently edits, or a major contributor, to a newsletter for space pirates.
Black Patch	Colonel Bleep	1957-1960	Part of the titular colonel's intergalactic rogues' gallery in this first color cartoon series made for television.
Pirate Clans	Exosquad	1993-1994	In the first season of this series, a group of humans defend their homeworlds from attack when under attack from these rogue pirates and humanoids, a theme which continues in season 2.
Sinbad and the Space Pirates	Challenge of the Super Friends	1978	Space pirates come to Earth to loot its treasure in the second part of episode 4.
Herc Starsailor	Jayce and the Wheeled Warriors	1985-86	A pirate, mercenary and captain of the space barge Pride of the Skies.
Magno Vivan	Vandread	2000-2001	The commander of the pirates and everyone addresses her as Boss (Okashira in the Japanese version, which was translated as "captain"). She sees her crew as her children and she hold them in high esteem, also she hold a picture of any of the crew who have left/died displayed when Gascogne apparently dies and she places her picture inside the cabinet.

== Comics and manga ==
Name	Work	Duration	Description
Abslom Daak	Doctor Who	1963-1989; 2005–present	Ex-convict, pirate and mercenary hired by the Time Lords to destroy Daleks in this comic, also appearing in the Deceit novel in 1993, traveling across the galaxy on his starship which is named the "Kill-Wagon."
Black Barney	Buck Rogers in the 25th Century A.D.	1929-1967	In this comic strip, Barney begins as a space pirate and later becomes a friend of Buck Rogers.
Cobra	Cobra	1978-1984	Appearing in this manga, then later in a film, anime, original video animation, Cobra is a notorious rogue pirate who refuses to align with a federation of star systems or a guild of pirates, meaning that he has to keep his identity hidden. In the process, he teams up with Jane, a bounty hunter who is trying to find her sisters, with their goal to liberate a treasure from the planet of Mars.
Queen Emeraldas	Queen Emeraldas; Galaxy Express 999; Space Pirate Captain Harlock	1978-1979; 1977-1981; 1977-1979	Spinoff character from Galaxy Express 999 (Note: First a manga, then an anime, and OVA, along with several films.) and Capt. Harlock in Leiji Matsumoto universe. Sister of Maetel from GE999. In the manga, ahe comforts the series protagonist, Hiroshi Umino, who escapes Earth on a freighter, and is fascinated by him, as she fled Earth in the past to a ship which she designed herself. Addiionally, Emeraldas shows up in the animate films Galaxy Express 999 (1977) and Space Battleship Yamato (1974).
Ironwolf	Weird Worlds	1972-1974; 2011	Antihero resisting the tyrannical Empress Hernandez. He first appeared in the last three issues of Weird Worlds, a comics anthology series published by American company DC Comics from 1972 to 1974. and was created by Howard Chaykin, who plotted and drew the stories.
Boris Jorgen	Explorers on the Moon	1953-59	The disgraced former aide to the King of Syldavia who attempts to steal Professor Calculus' rocket for the Stalinist regime of Borduria, and abandon Captain Haddock and the Thompsons on the moon.
Killer Kane	Buck Rogers in the 25th Century A.D.	1929-1967	Flamboyant 25th century crime boss, later dictator of earth and Saturn, with a fleet of spacecraft and raygun-toting henchmen who appeared in the Buck Rogers comic strip and its subsequent 1939 Buck Rogers serial film produced by Universal Studios, the 1979 film and subsequent TV series. Some reviewers believe that when measured against other serial villains such as Ming the Merciless, Killer Kane pales somewhat in comparison.
Jonathan Rockhal	Nathan Never	1991–present	A space pirate captain. John Silver, whose name was inspired by Long John Silver, a man with a mechanical leg, is his second-in-command, who appeared in these comics. Before they turned to piracy, they were generals of the Federal Army of Earth. Also in the comic series is a former space pirate named Madoc, a friend of Rebecca "Legs" Weaver, a colleague of the protagonist.
Kaguyo Ryuutsugi	Space Pirate (manga series)	2019–present	The blue-haired, arrogant and often impatient main character of the Space Pirate manga series. A known criminal among the Blue Sun Empire and son of the late Omega Pirate.
Starjammers	Uncanny X-Men	1963-2019	A team of space pirates, led by Corsair, appearing in American comic books published by Marvel Comics. The Starjammers first appeared in Uncanny X-Men #107 (October 1977) and were created by Dave Cockrum. The name "Starjammers" was created on the basis of the type of sailing ship known as "Windjammer".
Elon Cody Starbuck	Star Reach	1974-1979	In this 1970s comic, Starbuck is a "rollicking space pirate" and swashbuckler who was sometimes a hero, and other times a villain who has some redeeming qualities. Some have also said that Lieutenant Starbuck in Battlestar Galactica was based on Starbuck in this comic series.
The Star Pirate	Planet Comics	1940-1953	Called the "Robin Hood of the space lanes," looked very much like the DC Comics hero Starman, and appeared between issues #12 and #64. Among several artists, George Appel produced a dozen early issues, while the bulk of issues #33-51 were drawn by Murphy Anderson, whose additions transformed the Pirate into "an almost completely new strip." Three late issues (#59-61) are credited to newspaper comic strip artist Leonard Starr.
Yondu	Marvel Super-Heroes; Guardians 3000	1967-1982; 2014	An alien space pirate and mercenary who is a founding member of the Guardians of the Galaxy. A second incarnation of Yondu was introduced in the Earth-616 continuity and modeled after the Marvel Cinematic Universe incarnation of the character; this version of Yondu was identified by writer Sam Humphries as "the great, great, great, great, great, great, great grandfather of the Yondu in the original Guardians of the Galaxy and Guardians 3000." The Earth-616 Yondu is the leader of the Ravagers, a group of space pirates. Yondu finds Peter Quill when his ship malfunctions and strands him on Earth. The Ravagers rescue him as Peter tries to steal his ship, managing to outsmart every member of the crew and capturing Yondu. After Yondu frees himself from his restraints and attacks Peter, he gives him a choice between letting himself be released into space without more trouble or execution. Peter instead asks to join his crew. Yondu is initially skeptical of this idea, but after he learns Peter, like him, is a homeless orphan, Yondu allows him to stay on the ship with the Ravagers as their cleaning boy. Peter uses the opportunity to learn everything he can from space. Later, Yondu makes him an official Ravager.

== Film ==
Name	Work	Year	Description
Dagg Dibrim	Starchaser: The Legend of Orin	1985	In this space opera and animated film, Dagg is a pirate, crystal smuggler, and sidekick to the protagonist. Some have said he "resembles Burt Reynolds but behaves like Harrison Ford's Han Solo."
Brock Donnelly	Max Cloud (Note: Also called The Intergalactic Adventures of Max Cloud)	2020	In this film by director Martin Owen, Brock Donnelly is a space pirate with confusing motives, arriving suddenly in the story and often changing is allegiances.
Captain CJ "Hawk" Hawkens	Space Raiders	1983	Roguish protagonist and space pirate in this space opera, which is Roger Corman's dark spin on Star Wars.
Tex Hex	BraveStarr: The Movie	1988	This animated Space Western, based on the animated series of the same name, has an evil purple-skinned outlaw, minion to the demon Stampede.
The Hood	Thunderbirds Are Go	1966	Telepathic criminal mastermind who attempts to hijack the Zero-X spacecraft.
Nabel	Space Truckers	1996	A scientist who is later revealed to be a pirate captain of the Regalia named Macanudo, who rebuilt his grievously injured body and went into piracy as revenge against Saggs for betraying him.
Richard B. Riddick	The Chronicles of Riddick	2004	Escaped convict and last of the alien Furian race. Riddick was once a mercenary, then part of a security force, and later a soldier and ruler of the Necromongers.
Han Solo	Star Wars: Episode IV – A New Hope	1977	A pirate, mercenary and spice smuggler, best friend to the dog-like alien Chewbacca and lover to Princess Leia. In designing Solo, George Lucas used Humphrey Bogart as a point of reference, with Solo developing into a "tough James Dean style starpilot" that would appear in the finished film. After his appearance in a New Hope, he also appeared in Star Wars: Episode V – The Empire Strikes Back in 1980, Star Wars: Episode VI – Return of the Jedi in 1983, Star Wars: The Force Awakens in 2015, Solo: A Star Wars Story in 2018, and Star Wars: The Rise of Skywalker in 2019, along with in the Star Wars Holiday Special, the Star Wars Forces of Destiny series, and many other parts of the Star Wars franchise.
Mark Watney	The Martian (Note: Also a book of the same name)	2015	Watney, a botanist, notes with some glee that his plan to commandeer a NASA lander without explicit permission, as part of his rescue from being stranded on Mars, under his interpretation of applicable laws means that he is history's first "space pirate": citing that due to the Outer Space Treaty Mars is considered international territory, and citing that under the Law of the Sea, he is essentially hijacking a vessel without permission in international waters, "which, by definition, makes me a pirate." Other analysts have argued that he technically wasn't committing an act of piracy, however, due to the facts that 1 - it has not yet been explicitly established if the same laws for international waters apply to international territory such as Mars or Antarctica, 2 - "Piracy" explicitly refers to robbery by force from a crew, not "theft" of an uncrewed vessel as Watney did, and 3 - under space law, the vessel Watney was stealing would be considered U.S. territory and NASA property, and Watney was already a U.S. NASA astronaut.

== Literature ==
Name	Work	Release date	Description
Angelina	Stainless Steel Rat	1961-2010	Criminal mastermind with a powerful space battleship who becomes Jim's lover.
Captain Anton and Joseph Patrick Hansen	Lucky Starr and the Pirates of the Asteroids	1953	Anton is the captain of a space pirate ship. Hansen, apparently an eccentric hermit, is revealed to be the pirates' leader.
Boskone	Lensman	1948-1954	Galactic-wide pirate organization. in this influential space opera.
Bull Coxine	Tom Corbett, Space Cadet	1952-1956	Pirate who in 2353 led a breakout from the Solar Alliance prison asteroid and proceeded to prey upon various spacecraft until Tom Corbett and his unit mates Roger Manning and Astro defeated him.
Murdoch Juan	"The Pirate"	1968	A bold space adventurer in this story, which is part of The Psychotechnic League series. Whether Murdoch is to be actually defined as a pirate, or rather as a very daring but legitimate entrepreneur, is a major issue on which the whole story turns. In another one of his stories, the pirates are desperate to destroy the protagonist "before he can bring the information to the authorities."
Drongo Kane	John Grimes novels	1967-1976	A pirate captain who is the villain in several books, comes from the planet Austral, and other books mention the planet Australis in another part of the galaxy. His story "The Mountain Movers" (part of Grimes' early career) includes the song of future Australian space adventurers, sung to the tune of "Waltzing Matilda." The Duchy of Waldegren is also a popular haunt of several notorious space-pirates (no individual names given) in the series.
Talon Karrde	Thrawn trilogy	1991-1993	Karrde is a smuggler chief who becomes the leader of the criminal underworld after the death of Jabba Desilijic Tiure. The author of the trilogy, Timothy Zahn, said that when he created the character he "always envisioned the face and voice of Avon" from Blake's Seven.
Kraiklyn	Consider Phlebas	1987	Captain of the pirate ship Clear Air Turbulence, an avid gambler who leads his crew on two disastrous raids before being killed by the main character Horza.
Krys and Jolly U	Alisa Selezneva	1965-2003	Krys is a shape-shifter, and Jolly U is a fat humanoid. They appear as Alisa's antagonists in several books and their adaptations, such as The Mystery of the Third Planet and Guest from the Future.
Manjanungo	Race Across the Stars	1982-1984	A bloodthirsty space pirate in this novel, which is part of the Spaceways series.
Carson Napier	Venus Series	1932-1962	A dashing space-traveler, got to Venus by mistake, discovered there a tyrannical regime which sorely needed opposing - and the best way to do that was to assume leadership of the Pirates of Venus (also the title of the first book in the Venus series).
Red Peri	The Red Peri	1935	Peri is the novel's protagonist and space pirate who has a base on the Moon. Additionally, some said that "the background is imaginative, but the romance is on the level of the shopgirl pulps, and the writing leaves much to be desired," with David Bowman's helmetless spacewalk in 2001: A Space Odyssey inspired by Frank Keene's escape from the pirate base the novel.
Garris Shrike	Han Solo Trilogy	1997-1998	Space pirate, con artist, and mercenary who captured Han Solo as a child, turning him into a thief, while serving as his mentor. A similar character, named Tobias Beckett appeared in the Solo: A Star Wars Story film.
Star Seekers	Transformers: Exiles; Transformers: Retribution	2011; 2014	Transformer Pirates with a vendetta against Cybertron led by Thundertron, even appearing in the 2014 storyline for BotCon. Thundertron also appeared as a figure in the Transformers: Prime toyline. Reportedly, Transformers Prime would have introduced pirates if it has continued. Also, there was the Dread Pirate Crew which appeared in Transformers: Wings Universe, a universe based on the original cartoon, depicted in comics, and prose stories.
Booster Terrik	X-Wing	1996-2012	Terrik was a criminal who was imprisoned by protagonist Corran Horn's father, as well as an old friend of another protagonist Wedge Antilles. Later in the series, Horn marries Terrik's daughter Mirax, despite Terrik's initial objections.
Gammis Turek	Vatta's War	2003-2008	Formerly a little-known gang boss based out of Woosten, though thanks to time and planning he becomes leader of the biggest pirate organization in the history of the universe, as shown in the last three novels of the series, Engaging the Enemy (2006) and Command Decision (2007).
Unnamed	Barbary Station	2017	A pair of engineers join a group of space pirates but the engineers work to "take down a sinister AI" so they can gain the trust of the crew.

== Live-action television ==
Name	Work	Duration	Description
Space Pirate Alien Barossa	Ultraman Z	2020	They are a race of pirates born in a clutches of 10,000. They made their reputation by stealing weapons from their defeated opponents. Prior to the series, Ultraman Zero encountered a Barossa that fought using trickery. The Barossas are designed by Kengo Kusunoki as an alien that will represent the Reiwa era of Japan and are villains in the series.
Roj Blake	Blake's Seven	1978-81	Blake is a political dissident and captain of the spaceship Liberator who leads his crew of thieves, freedom fighters and smugglers against the evil Terran Federation.
John Crichton	Farscape	1999-2007	An astronaut from Earth who travels to a distant galaxy through a wormhole and joins the space pirate crew of the sentient starship Moya.
Divatox	Power Rangers Turbo	1997	In this series, Divatox is an intergalactic space pirate and villain. In the 1997 film, she is seeking his golden key to traverse an inter-dimensional gateway and enter into matrimony with Maligore, an imprisoned demon who promises her great riches and power.
Tylon Gershom	Space Precinct	1994-95	A smuggler of alien refugees who murders Lt. Brogan's informant on the planet Altor.
Gokaigers	Kaizoku Sentai Gokaiger	2011-2012	Characters from a Super Sentai series who travel to Earth in search of the "Greatest Treasure in the Universe", only to be dragged into a battle with an invading alien force called the Space Empire Zangyack.
Malcolm "Mal" Reynolds	Firefly	2002	Former rebel Browncoat soldier and captain of Serenity, who has been described as someone that is "everything that a hero is not." He is a survivor who tries to stay alive and get by, raised by his mother and "about 40 hands" on a ranch on the planet Shadow. He occasionally surprises his friends by displaying familiarity with disparate literature varying from the works of Xiang Yu to poems by Samuel Taylor Coleridge, though he has no idea "who" Mona Lisa is.
Thadiun Okona	Star Trek: The Next Generation	1987-94	In this sci-fi retelling of Romeo and Juliet, Okona is a Han Solo-like thief and smuggler who ends a long-running feud between two powerful families by transporting a valuable ancestral jewel to princess Yanar of Altia on behalf of his best friend Benzan of Thesia.
Camina Drummer	The Expanse	2015-2022	In the fifth and sixth seasons of the show, Camina Drummer (formerly head of security at Tycho Space Station) joins a commune of space pirates using the ships Dewalt, Mowtang, and Tynan.
Klaus Ashford	The Expanse	2015-2022	Before the events of the series, Klaus Ashford was the captain of the Tynan, a pirate ship. Eventually he leaves this lifestyle, and the Tynan is used to stop space pirates for the OPA. Eventually the ship becomes a pirate ship again, this time under captain Camina Drummer.
Saffron	Firefly	2002	She is a very crafty and amoral con artist who assumes convenient identities to commit grand thefts, is known to seduce—and frequently marry, and an occasional ship thief.
Alonzo P. Tucker	Lost in Space	1965-1968	Inspired by Long John Silver, especially as portrayed by Robert Newton in this series, which was "aimed primarily at children." He is introduced in the episode "The Sky Pirate" as a human rogue of sorts, and is clearly defined as a space pirate by TV Guide.

== Music ==
Name	Work	Release date	Description
Alestorm	Heavy Metal Pirates	2008	Although Alestorm usually sing about sea pirates from the golden age of piracy, the subject of this song is time-travelling space pirates with a cosmic battleship of steel.
Blondie	Tide Is High	1980	In the music video, Blondie and her group board a rocketship, collide with a flying saucer, and confront an alien resembling Darth Vader.
Gwar	Scumdogs of the Universe	1990	Alien space pirates unleash a reign of terror on Earth.

== Video games ==
Name	Work	Release date	Description
Kaptin Bluddflagg	Warhammer 40,000: Dawn of War II – Retribution	2011	Leader of the Ork Freebootaz who wants to pillage the Aurelia sector with his fleet of stolen Imperial cruisers. Is famous for stealing the hats of defeated enemies.
Black Sun Pirates	Star Wars: Empire at War	2006	This game contains a non-playable faction called the Black Sun Pirates, who are a large gang of mercenaries. In addition, during the Clone Wars, the criminal elements which comprised the Black Sun syndicate flourished, and it was led by a "cabal of Falleen nobles" on Mustafar, appearing in the series Star Wars: The Clone Wars. and in a comic book series.
Captain Blackbeard	Megaman Battle Network 6	2005-2006	This game includes a WWW member named Captain Blackbeard, an operator of Diveman.EXE who dressed as a sailor. He is also known as Captain Kurohige in Japan.
The Bonne Family	Mega Man Legends	1997-1998	This video game consists of Teisel, Tron, Bon, and 40 Servbots. and the youngest brother, Bon Bonne, who can only say one word—"Babu!" The Bonnes are accompanied by forty Servbots, robots under the care of Tron. They are air pirates in their own series, only being space pirates in the crossovers Namco × Capcom and Project X Zone.
Star Captain Dread	Hashtronauts: Joint Game Cruiser	2022	Toking Space Pirate and leader of the STAR Party International. Join Star Captain Dread on a campaign to commandeer the direction of the world's future by joining the Hashtronauts at Starport420.online. Star Captain Dread is an entertainer, creator of board games, video games, music, and actively blogs about Space politics and futurism - who is featured as the main character in the Hashtronauts: Joint Game Cruiser (arcade) video game for the web.
Jackals	Halo 2	2004	A sci-fi race of reptilian-like creatures who are notorious for piracy in space in this video game.
Jimmy	Mouthwashing	2024	The sociopathic lieutenant of the Pony Express freighter Tulpar who hijacks the ship after incapacitating Captain Curly, strands it on an asteroid and subjects the surviving crew to physical and mental tortures.
Ridley	Metroid	1986-2017	A dragon-like alien that is a top ranking member of the space pirates.
Sally	Fallout 3	2008-2009	A child victim of alien abduction who helps the Vault Dweller take over Mothership Zeta, destroy an enemy flying saucer, and plunder the aliens' advanced technology. The rest of her crew include the samurai Toshiro Kago, the mercenary Somah, doctor Elliot Tecorian, and the cowboy Paulson.
Space Pirates	Kid Icarus: Uprising	2012	Futuristic, seemingly mechanical beings, and antagonists. They act as enemies of Pit and the Underworld Army where they roam the Galactic Sea and steal the constellations. Besides the generic Space Pirates, among the members of the Space Pirates are the Space Pirate Captain, Space Pirate Commando, and Space Pirate Sniper. They are reportedly called "Star Thieves" in Japan.

== See also ==
- List of fictional pirates
- Outlaw (stock character)
- Space Cowboy (disambiguation)
- Space marine
- Space Western
- The Five Gold Bands
- Pirates in popular culture
- List of pirate films
