= List of fictional pirates =

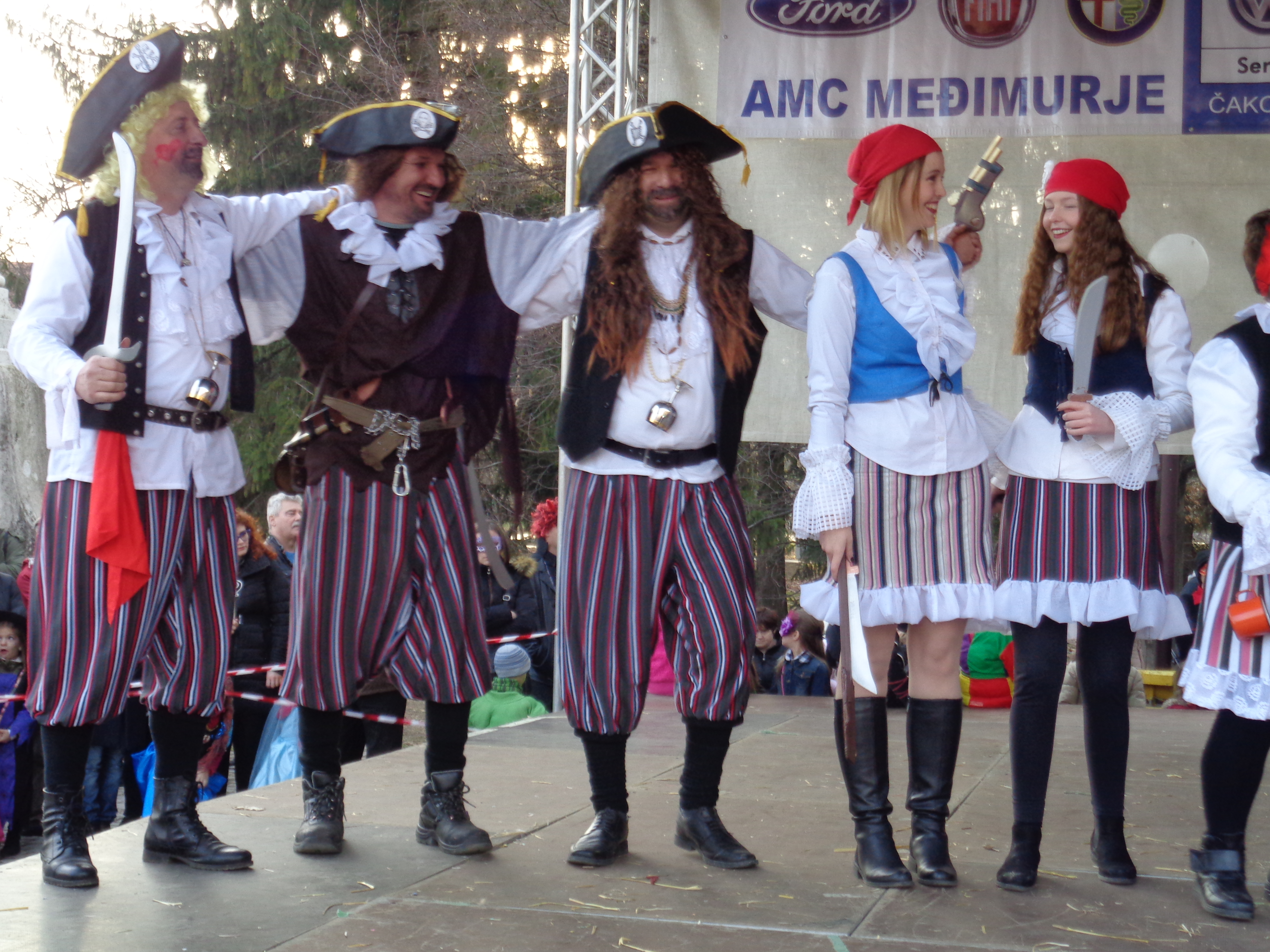
People cosplaying as pirates at Medjimurje Carnival 2017 in Croatia.

This is a list of fictional pirates, organized into either air pirates, (Note: Also known as "sky pirates") sea pirates, or space pirates. They may be outlaws, but are not the same as space marines or space cowboys in space westerns. To learn more about pirates and their context in popular culture as a whole, see the Pirates in popular culture and List of pirate films pages.

Within each category, the characters are organized alphabetically by surname (i.e. last name), or by single name if the character does not have a surname. If more than two characters are in one entry, the last name of the first character is used.

== Sea pirates ==
Names	Work	Years	Type of Media	Description
Angelica	Pirates of the Caribbean: On Stranger Tides	2011	Film	She is the daughter of Blackbeard and a former love interest of Jack Sparrow's. She first met Jack just before she was to take a vow of celibacy in a Spanish convent; she later blames Jack for her corruption, although Jack counters this argument citing that she was 'hardly innocent' to begin with.
Hector Barbossa	Pirates of the Caribbean	2003–2017	Film series	Barbossa who appears in all of the films and by the fourth film, On Stranger Tides, he has become a privateer in the Royal Navy and is ordered to be Jack's guide on an expedition for the Fountain of Youth.
Bêlit	Queen of the Black Coast	1934	Pulp fiction	appeared also in a number of pastiches, comics, and games of the Conan the Barbarian franchise
Blackbeard	Pirates of the Caribbean: On Stranger Tides	2011	Film	Blackbeard appears in this film He is based on the historical figure of the same name. Blackbeard is a notorious pirate and Jack's most recent nemesis. He is one element retained from the novel On Stranger Tides by Tim Powers, from which Pirates of the Caribbean: On Stranger Tides draws inspiration. Blackbeard is the captain of the Queen Anne's Revenge and a master of black magic, who wants to find the Fountain of Youth to escape a prophecy that he will be killed by a one-legged man. With the exception of his daughter Angelica, Blackbeard has zombified his entire staff of officers to ensure their loyalty. Said by Jack to be "the one pirate all pirates fear", Blackbeard practices voodoo and has the power to command ships using his magic sword.
Stede Bonnet	Our Flag Means Death		TV series	
Bloth	The Pirates of Dark Water	1991–1993	Animated TV series	The evil pirate lord Bloth will stop at nothing to get the treasures for himself and provides many obstacles for Ren and his crew, serving as the ox-sized, humanoid pirate captain of the feared pirate ship Maelstrom and one of the primary antagonists of the series. Ioz is also a rogue and pirate who joins up with Ren initially for the promise of treasure.
Captain Chestbeard	Plants vs. Zombies	2015–present	Comics	Captain Chestbeard appears in the Dark Horse Comics series Plants vs. Zombies as an antagonist opposed by Crazy Dave and Patrice Blazing, and Nate Timely, serving as a common enemy of theirs and Dr. Zomboss, with whom they are later forced to ally, so-named for his incredibly hairy chest.
Conrad	The Corsair	1814	Poetry	Conrad, the protagonist of this tale in verse by Lord Byron published in 1814, which was extremely popular and influential in its day, selling ten thousand copies on its first day of sale, was rejected by society in his youth and later becomes a corsair fighting against humanity (excepting women); in the opera Il corsaro by Giuseppe Verdi, loosely based on Byron's work, Conrad becomes the dashing and chivalrous Corrado. The story is also based on The Corsair are the overture Le Corsaire by Hector Berlioz and the ballet Le Corsaire by Marius Petipa. Many Americans believed that Lord Byron's poem "The Corsair" was based on the life of the privateer/pirate Jean Lafitte. Henry Singleton and Richard Corbould produced paintings based on the work.
Vandala Doubloons	Monster High	2015	Doll franchise	Vandala Doubloons is the daughter of a pirate ghost and has a pet cuttlefish named Aye. (Note: Vandala owns her own pirate ship called the Salty Spectre, which is complete with a "skeleton crew" consisting of actual skeletons. She loves to take the ship out to sea and explore. Her only problem is that she gets seasick very easily which is something she feels is not conducive to being a pirate captain.) Her dress is sea-foam green with wave patterns and lace. Her debut was in the TV special Haunted as a Haunted High student that is rescued from detention, and later transfers to Monster High. Her doll was presented at San Diego Comic-Con in 2014.
Captain Feathersword	The Wiggles	1991–present	children's music	"The friendly pirate" who wields a "feathersword".
Captain Flint	Treasure Island	1883	Novel	The pirate captain who hid his treasures on the novel's titular island.
José Gaspar, "Gasparilla"	Florida folklore	circa 1900	Several pulp novels, a parade	Mythical Spanish pirate supposedly based in southwest Florida during the late 18th and early 19th centuries. Though there has been some confusion about Gaspar's historical existence, no evidence to support the legend has ever been found, and it is acknowledged to be a local tall tale. Gaspar is the inspiration and main character in Tampa's annual Gasparilla Pirate Festival.
Sea Hag	Thimble Theatre/Popeye	1929	Comics	The Sea Hag is a major enemy of Popeye the Sailor. She is the last witch on earth, and a pirate who sails the Seven Seas in her ship "The Black Barnacle." She has a headquarters on Plunder Island, where she keeps a pride of lions that she uses to dispatch her enemies. She also has a deep knowledge of magic artifacts and has used many of them to great effect over the years. The Sea Hag was created by Elzie Crisler Segar in 1929 as part of the Thimble Theatr comic strip.
Hassan	Tactical Roar	2006	Anime series	Hassan is a man who was "hunting for an escort ship," claiming to be a captain, actually a pirate. This anime series is centered around all-female crew of a commercial Warship, the Pascal Magi, which is trying to fight pirates in the near future.
Captain Hook	Peter Pan, or The Boy Who Wouldn't Grow Up	1904	Play	In 1904, this play by J.M. Barrie was first performed. In the book, Peter's enemy in Neverland is the pirate crew led by Captain Hook. Details on Barrie's conception of Captain Hook are lacking, but it seems he was inspired by at least one historical privateer, and possibly by Robert Louis Stevenson's Long John Silver as well. In film adaptations released in 1924, 1953, and 2003, Hook's dress, as well as the attire of his crew, corresponds to stereotypical notions of pirate appearance.
Davy Jones	Pirates of the Caribbean	2006–2017	Films	Jones is the immortal supernatural force and cursed captain of Flying Dutchman. In At World's End, Lord Cutler Beckett uses the heart to force Jones to serve him. In Dead Men Tell No Tales, Jones makes a cameo in a post-credits scene. Will Turner and Elizabeth Swann are asleep when their bedroom is entered by the shadow of an apparently resurrected Davy Jones. Will then awakens and, assuming that he was simply dreaming, goes back to sleep. The camera then pans to the floor, revealing a puddle of water and barnacles.
Killian Jones	Once Upon a Time (TV series)	2011–2018	TV series	Captain Hook (Killian Jones) – A fictional pirate from the television series Once Upon a Time (TV series) (2011–2018), portrayed by Colin O'Donoghue. Based on the classic character from Peter Pan, this version reimagines Hook as Killian Jones, a former naval officer turned pirate, who plays a central role in the series’ storyline.
Edward Kenway	Assassin's Creed IV: Black Flag	2013	Video Game	Kenway is a Welsh privateer-turned-pirate, operating in the Caribbean during the final decades of the Golden Age of Piracy. During this time, he plays an important role in the establishment of a short-lived Pirate Republic, and inadvertently becomes caught in the conflict between the Assassin Brotherhood and the Templar Order.
Johnny LaFitte	Pirate Blood	1964	Short story	LaFitte, of Glenora, California, is a 20th-century descendant of Jean Lafitte who in Edgar Rice Burroughs's story "Pirate Blood," part of The Wizard of Venus novella, gets to the distant Vulture's Island, where his pirate heredity asserts itself in a modern piratical career full of cold-blooded murders and rapes.
Captain Leatherwing	Batman: Leatherwing	1994	Comics	Captain Leatherwing / Batman (in this alternative universe), captain of the Flying Fox, he is employed by King James II of England to pillage rival countries' ships, though he keeps a share for himself and his men. He wears a costume to protect his family name, since England would be appalled at one of her children sailing about the seas like he does. He raids ship and collects gold in the hope that he will one day have enough to buy back the land of his parents, which were stolen from him when they were murdered.
Monkey D. Luffy	One Piece	1997–present	Manga and anime series	Monkey D. Luffy is a fictional character and the main protagonist of the One Piece manga series, created by Eiichiro Oda. Luffy made his debut in chapter one as a young boy who acquires the properties of rubber after accidentally eating one of the devil fruits, Gum Gum Fruit.
Lukkage	Gargantia on the Verdurous Planet	2013	Anime series	Lukkage is a pirate leader who launched an attack on the Gargantia after Ledo kills some of her men to protect Bellows and her crew, and has two female sex slaves who also serve as her co-pilots for her mecha, as shown in the episode "The Villainous Empress" and other episodes. Later she develops a romantic interest in Pinion, especially with his hair down. Some time after being defeated by the Gargantia's forces with Ledo's help, she reappears as part of Kugel's fleet, yet she helps to rebel against it. She also reappears in the 2013 OVAs "Abandoned Fleet" and "Altar of the Visitor from Afar" as a scalvenger.
Rokuro Okajima	Black Lagoon	2006	Anime series	Rokuro "Rock" Okajima, who later eventually begins to enjoy his life as a pirate and becomes even more comfortable with corruption, and demonstrates a duplicitous, ruthless side of his personality clearly influenced by Revy and Roanapur. He is one of the pirates in this story follows a team of pirate mercenaries known as the Lagoon Company, that smuggles goods in and around the seas of Southeast Asia in the early to mid 1990s. (Note: In the El Baile de la Muerte arc, the tombstone of Diego Jose San Fernando Lovelace showed that he died in the year 1991, although the North American translation/publication showed that he died in 1996. Also, in the same arc, American soldiers are seen using EO Tech holographic weapons sights, which were not developed until the mid-to-late 1990s.) Their base of operations is located in the fictional harbor city of Roanapur in east Thailand near the border of Cambodia (somewhere in the Amphoe Mueang Trat district, likely on the mainland north/northeast of the Ko Chang island or on the island itself). Other pirates in The Lagoon Company include Revy, Dutch, and Benny.
Painty the Pirate	SpongeBob SquarePants	1999–present	Animated comedy TV series	Painty the Pirate is a painting of a pirate with a live-action mouth. He appears in the title sequence of SpongeBob episodes. At the beginning of the sequence, he asks, "Are ya ready, kids?" before performing the theme song.
Patchy the Pirate	SpongeBob SquarePants	1999–present	Animated comedy TV series	Patchy the Pirate is the live-action host of the series. He appears in episodes (usually specials) that feature segments of his own. He lives in Encino, Los Angeles and has a pet parrot, Potty.
Piet Piraat	Piet Piraat	2001–present	Children's program	Piet, otherwise known as "Pete the Pirate"," is a good-natured adventurous pirate in a Flemish children's program.
The Pirates	Asterix	1959–present	Comics	This group of hapless pirates in Albert Uderzo's Astérix are themselves parodies of the characters of Redbeard (see above), and often run into Asterix and Obelix and are subsequently beaten up and usually sunk.
Captain Pugwash	Captain Pugwash	1974–1975	Animated series	Pugwash is a fictional pirate in a series of British children's comic strips and books created by John Ryan. The character's adventures were adapted into a TV series, using cardboard cut-outs filmed in live-action (the first series was performed and broadcast live), also called Captain Pugwash, first shown on the BBC in 1957, a later colour series, first shown in 1974–75, and a traditional animation series, The Adventures of Captain Pugwash, first aired in 1998.
Captain Redbeard	Redbeard	1959–present	Comic series	This Belgian comics series by Jean-Michel Charlier and Victor Hubinon stars captain Redbeard.
Santiago Montes	Santiago of the Seas	2020–present	Animated TV series	The show follows Santiago, an 8-year-old pirate, and his crew as they embark on rescues, uncover hidden treasures and keeps the Caribbean high seas safe. The show is infused with Spanish language and Latino-Caribbean culture and curriculum.
Long John Silver	Treasure Island	1883	Novel	This an adventure novel, by Scottish author Robert Louis Stevenson, narrates a tale of "buccaneers and buried gold." Its influence is enormous on popular perceptions of pirates, including such elements as treasure maps marked with an "X", schooners, the Black Spot, tropical islands, and one-legged seamen bearing parrots on their shoulders. Long John Silver, a cook on the voyage to Treasure Island, is the secret ringleader of the pirate band. His physical and emotional strength are impressive. Silver is deceitful and disloyal, greedy and visceral, and does not care about human relations. Yet he is always kind toward Jim and genuinely fond of the boy. Silver is a powerful mixture of charisma and self-destructiveness, individualism and recklessness. Stevenson's portrayal of Silver has greatly influenced the modern iconography of the pirate.
Jack Sparrow	Pirates of the Caribbean	2003–2017	Film series	Pirates of the Caribbean is a series of fantasy swashbuckler films produced by Jerry Bruckheimer and based on Walt Disney's theme park attraction of the same name. The film series serves as a major component of the eponymous media franchise. Captain Jack Sparrow is the protagonist of the series, portrayed by Johnny Depp, In Dead Man's Chest, it is revealed that Sparrow once made a deal with Davy Jones and in the third film, it is revealed that Sparrow is one of the members of the Brethren Court, acting as Pirate Lord of the Caribbean. In the fifth film, when faced with execution, Jack is rescued by Henry Turner- the son of Will and Elizabeth- who seeks Jack's help in finding the Trident of Poseidon, which gives its wielder control of the seas. Jack Sparrow is also the subject of two series of books, Pirates of the Caribbean: Jack Sparrow and Pirates of the Caribbean: Legends of the Brethren Court, one standalone novel, Pirates of the Caribbean: The Price of Freedom, and has also appeared in numerous video games, such as The Legend of Jack Sparrow.
Syndicate of Pirates	The Great Pirate Syndicate	1899	Novel	The Syndicate of Pirates use flying machines (not yet invented at the time of writing) and secret rays to terrorise the adventurers of the Klondike Gold Rush in Alaska – in George Griffith's book The Great Pirate Syndicate (1899)
Captain Syrup	Wario Land Wario Land II Wario Land: Shake It!	1994, 1998, 2008	Video game	A female pirate who serves as Wario's main rival throughout all three titles.
Dan Tempest	The Buccaneers	1956–1957	TV series	Starring Robert Shaw as Dan Tempest, the series, aimed at children, followed the adventures of Tempest and his crew of former pirates as they made their way across the seven seas in Sultana.
Abraham Tuizentfloot	The Adventures of Nero	1957	Comics	Tuizentfloot is a mad man dressed up as a pirate who frequently wants to attack people. He debuted in Marc Sleen's The Adventures of Nero in 1957.
Various characters	The Pirates of Penzance	1879	Opera	In 1879, this comic opera was an instant hit in New York, and the original London production in 1880 ran for 363 performances. The piece, depicting an incompetent band of "tenderhearted" British pirates, is still performed widely today, and obviously corresponds to historical knowledge about the emergence of piracy in the Caribbean.
Various characters	Sea of Red	2005–2006	Comic book series	Featuring 16th century vampire pirates, the series was written by Rick Remender and Kieron Dwyer and drawn by Salgood Sam and Paul Harmon.
Captain Richard Warrington	Naughty Marietta	1910	Operetta	Set in New Orleans in 1780, it tells how Captain Richard Warrington is commissioned to unmask and capture a notorious French pirate calling himself "Bras Pique" – and how he is helped and hindered by a high-spirited runaway, Contessa Marietta. The score includes many well-known songs, including "Ah! Sweet Mystery of Life". Naughty Marietta had its first performance on October 24, 1910, in Syracuse, New York, and opened on Broadway on November 7, 1910, playing for 136 performances at the New York Theatre. It enjoyed revivals in 1929 at Jolson's 59th Street Theatre and in 1931 at Erlanger's Theatre. The operetta became Victor Herbert's greatest success.

== Air pirates ==
Names	Work	Years	Type of Media	Description
Abney Park	Airship Pirates Chronicles	2011	Role-playing game	This game, based on the backstory of the band, Abney Park, is set in the post-apocalyptic world after their album, The End Of Days, a future world with a severely disrupted timeline, with the game featuring steampunk themes and Victorian-era style. Airship Pirates places players as air pirates in command of their own steam-powered airships, who seek not only to pillage the skies, but to plunder history, possibly causing even greater disruption to the past. Meanwhile, the world below struggles in Victorian-style squalor under an oppressive government that maintains control through clockwork policemen. In December 2011, the RPG game won Diehard GameFAN's "Best Core Rulebook of 2011" award.
Barney Baxter	Barney Baxter in the Air	1935–1950	Comic strip	Barney Baxter was an "adventure strip" involving heroic exploits centering on aviation. Baxter was often accompanied by his sidekick Gopher Gus, who (unlike the rest of the characters) was drawn with the exaggerated facial features of a "humour strip" character. Other characters were Barney's mother, his rival love interests, Patricia and Maura, and his buddy Hap Walters.
Blackbeard	Pan	2015	Film	Blackbeard leads a group of pirates in this 2015 fantasy film who use flying sailing ships.
Kasey Boon	Mysticons	2017–2018	Animated TV series	Younger brother of Kitty, who Emerald Goldenbraid, one of the story's protagonists, developed a crush on. He gave her a bracelet which was revealed to be a tracking device to follow the Mysticons. He later appears to have second thoughts about taking advantage of Em's feelings for him, and catches her, after which the two have a serious romance. In the comics, he debuts in Volume 2.
Kitty Boon	Mysticons	2017-2018	Animated TV series	Captain of the Pink Skulls, female pirate, and Zarya's childhood friend. She takes advantage of this relationship to incapacitate the Mysticons and obtain the Dragon Disk, which she sells to Dreadbane. She later fights alongside the Mysticons, and on a third occasion gives Zarya inspiration to thwart Necrafa's plans. She is later revealed to be Zarya's romantic love interest as confirmed by the show's creator, Sean Jara, and supported by show director Matt Ferguson. In the comic books, she debuts in Volume 2.
Captain Andian Cly	Boneshaker	2009	Novel	This 2009 novel by Cherie Priest features air pirates like captain Cly, who commands a ship called the "Naamah Darling" and he later appears in novels like Ganymede, where he loves a woman in the Seattle Underground.
Dola	Castle in the Sky	1986	Anime film	Dola, a "bold, plump old lady named Dola, leads a gang of air pirates in this 1986 Japanese anime film, as they try to steal the crystal necklace of Sheeta.
Captain Gyrfalcon	Exalted	2001	Role playing game	Gyrfalcon appeared in this high fantasy role playing game.
Prince James; Other "social revolutionaries"	The Raid of the Mercury	1931	Short story	James committed an act of air piracy, with fellow "social revolutionaries," in this short story by A. H. Johnson.
Don Karnage	TaleSpin	1990-1991	Animated series	Karnage leads gang of air pirates in this Disney animated series and later in Ducktales. According to series creator Jymn Magon, he is a wolf, but has orangish-brown fur reminiscent of a fox.
Alexandre LeRoi	Batman: Master of the Future	1991	Graphic novel	LeRoi is a sky pirate who is flamboyant and demands that he be proclaimed master of the city, or else he will burn it to the ground. He leaps out the window before he can be arrested, and Tolliver insists that the fair proceed.
Miles Lydecker	Black Condor Vol 1 #2	1992	Comics	Lyndecker is another DC Comics air pirate who fought against Black Condor in the 1992 comic Black Condor Vol 1 #2.
Captain Mors	The Air Pirate and His Steerable Airship	1908-1911	Pulp Magazine	The German pulp magazine The Air Pirate and His Steerable Airship from 1908 to 1911, followed the adventures of Captain Mors, the "Air pirate".
Captain Plunder his Sky Pirates	Sonic the Comic	1993–2002	Comic	Plunder and fellow sky pirates appear in this comic.
Captain Phoenix	Jak and Daxter: The Lost Frontier	2009	Video game	Phoenix leads a gang of space pirates, like Danger Sexy Pirate, in massive ships who battle the protagonists while having a flying airbase known as Phoenix.
Robur	Robur the Conqueror	1886; 1904	Novel	He is an inventor who kidnaps people and takes them aboard his advanced aircraft in the 1886 novel Robur the Conqueror and its 1904 sequel Master of the World (both written by Jules Verne), as well as in the 1961 film adaptation based on elements of both novels.
Ruby Heart	Marvel vs. Capcom 2	2000	Video game	She is a French-speaking pirate captain and the main protagonist of the game. Being an original character specifically designed for this entry, she has yet to return to any other game.
Captain Shakespeare	Stardust	2007	Film	Shakespeare leads aerial pirates in this fantasy film, commanding a ship called the Caspartine.
Silvana crew	Last Exile	2003	Anime series	The crew of the airship Silvana in the anime series Last Exile are sky pirates, while sky pirates appear in the sequel series Last Exile: Fam the Silver Wing.
Baroness Troixmonde / Filibus	Filibus	1915	Silent film	The film's protagonist has a secret identity and is known to the world as Filibus and has an airship. Some called the film "an odd and funny forerunner of science-fiction movies," with Filibus described as a lesbian character, and an "elegant and elusive woman pirate" who can pass between male and female identities, making her "a champion of transgenderism before that term had been coined."
Unnamed	The Sky Police	1910	Short story	This short story by John A. Heffernan features an air pirate.
Unnamed	Pirates of 1920	1911	Silent film	Air pirates appeared in the 1911 silent film Pirates of 1920.
Unnamed	The Pirates of the Sky: A Tale of Modern Adventure	1915	Novel	Sky pirates appear in Stephen Gaillard's 1915 novel, The Pirates of the Sky: A Tale of Modern Adventure.
Unnamed	Sky Pirates of Callisto	1973	Novels	There are sky pirates in the Callisto series of novels.
Unnamed	Crimson Skies	2000–2003	Game franchise	The series is set within an alternate history of the 1930s invented by Weisman and McCoy. Within this divergent timeline, the United States has collapsed, and air travel has become the most popular mode of transportation in North America; as a result, air pirates thrive in the world of Crimson Skies. In describing the concept of Crimson Skies, Jordan Weisman stated he wanted to "take the idea of 16th century Caribbean piracy and translate into a 1930s American setting".
Unnamed	Pirate101	2012	Video game	Players can complete quests, sail ships, befriend companions, and battle enemies in a turn-based combat system similar to that used in board games.
Unnamed	Mandrake the Magician	1934–2013	Comic strip	Mandrake, along with the Phantom Magician in Mel Graff's The Adventures of Patsy, is regarded by comics historians as the first superhero of comics, such as comics historian Don Markstein, who writes, "Some people say Mandrake the Magician, who started in 1934, was comics' first superhero."
Unnamed	The Magnificent Kotobuki	2019	Anime series	The anime's protagonists run escorts to fend off attacks from air pirates.
Vaan; Balthier	Final Fantasy	1987–present	Media franchise	The sky pirates of the Final Fantasy media franchise include Vaan and Balthier. For Balthier, he eventually decided to cut his ties with his father and his role as a judge, becoming a sky pirate under a new name, abandoning his old name. For Vaan, he ends the game, Final Fantasy XII, as a sky pirate, traveling the world along with Penelo. He also reprises his role from Final Fantasy XII in the manga adaptation by Gin Amou.
Vyse; Gilder; Enrique	Skies of Arcadia	2000-2003	Video game	In this video game, Yse is a young and dashing sky pirate who is part of the Blue Rogue clan and soon become entangled in a race to find the Moon Stones that control these powerful Gigas. Other sky pirates include Gilder and Enrique.

== Space pirates ==
Names	Work	Years	Type of Media	Description
Amsaja	Cleopatra in Space	2020–present	Animated TV series	The self-declared "Queen of the Space Pirates," who heads a crew of three other pirates (Ostea, Cyborg Dwayne, and Boop), and the doppelgänger of series protagonist, Cleopatra. She previously had the telepathic space shark ninja as her ex-boyfriend, and the series villain, Octavian, might be her ex-boyfriend as well.
Atomsk	FLCL	2000–2001	Anime series	Pirate King in this OVA, who also appears in the manga, and two anime series, FLCL Progressive and FLCL Alternative.
Ryoko Balta	Tenchi Muyo! GXP	2002	Anime series	Although she named herself after Ryoko Hakubi, Balta is hardly as bloodthirsty as that infamous space pirate was rumored to be, although she is notorious. Even though she was a member of the dreaded Daluma pirate guild, Ryoko Balta is an educated and cultured pirate. She is well-versed in many customs from other planets, including the Japanese Tea Ceremony.
Black Barney	Buck Rogers in the 25th Century A.D.	1929–1967	Comic strip	In this comic strip, Barney begins as a space pirate and later becomes a friend of Buck Rogers.
Lars Barriga	Steven Universe; Steven Universe Future	2013–2019; 2019–2020	Animated TV series	A human who died on the Gem Homeworld and was resurrected by Steven, later becoming the captain of a group of fugitive gems on a stolen spaceship. He has been described as "complicated fellow" by his voice actor, Matthew Moy, and was designed by series creator Rebecca Sugar when she was in college. Some have said that the outfit Lars wears is reminiscent of Captain Harlock.
Black Sun Pirates	Star Wars: Empire at War	2006	Video game	This game contains a non-playable faction called the Black Sun Pirates, who are a large gang of mercenaries. In addition, during the Clone Wars, the criminal elements which comprised the Black Sun syndicate flourished, and it was led by a "cabal of Falleen nobles" on Mustafar, appearing in the series Star Wars: The Clone Wars. and in a comic book series.
Captain Blackbeard	Megaman Battle Network 6	2005–2006	Video game	This game includes a WWW member named Captain Blackbeard, an operator of Diveman.EXE who dressed as a sailor. He is also known as Captain Kurohige in Japan.
The Bonne Family	Mega Man Legends	1997–1998	Video game	This video game consists of Teisel, Tron, Bon, and 40 Servbots. and the youngest brother, Bon Bonne, who can only say one word—"Babu!" The Bonnes are accompanied by forty Servbots, robots under the care of Tron. They are air pirates in their own series, only being space pirates in the crossovers Namco × Capcom and Project X Zone.
Black Patch	Colonel Bleep	1957–1960	Animated TV series	Part of the titular colonel's intergalactic rogues' gallery in this first color cartoon series made for television.
Boop	Cleopatra in Space	2020–present	Animated TV series	She is a doppelgänger of Mihos, Cleo's animal companion. She is on the pirate ship along with Cyborg Dwayne, Amsaja, and Ostea. His attack cry is just saying her name over and over.
Boskone	Lensman	1948–1954	Novels	Galactic-wide pirate organization. in this influential space opera.
Brak	Space Ghost; Space Ghost Coast to Coast	1966–1967; 1994–2008	Animated TV series	A supervillain who is portrayed as a catlike alien space pirate trying to conquer the galaxy. Cartoon Network described him as having "meager wits and the love of a peppy tune."
Cobra	Cobra	1978–1984	Manga	Appearing in this manga, then later in a film, anime, original video animation, Cobra is a notorious rogue pirate who refuses to align with a federation of star systems or a guild of pirates, meaning that he has to keep his identity hidden. In the process, he teams up with Jane, a bounty hunter who is trying to find her sisters, with their goal to liberate a treasure from the planet of Mars.
Bull Coxine	Tom Corbett, Space Cadet	1952–1956	Novel	Pirate who in 2353 led a breakout from the Solar Alliance prison asteroid and proceeded to prey upon various spacecraft until Tom Corbett and his unit mates Roger Manning and Astro defeated him.
Captain Cracker	ThunderCats; ThunderCats Roar	1985–1989; 2020–present	Animated TV series	A robotic space pirate who has a robot parrot which sits on his shoulder.
Abslom Daak	Doctor Who	1963–1989; 2005–present	Comics	Ex-convict, pirate and mercenary hired by the Time Lords to destroy Daleks in this comic, also appearing in the Deceit novel in 1993, traveling across the galaxy on his starship which is named the "Kill-Wagon."
Dagg Dibrim	Starchaser: The Legend of Orin	1985	Film	In this space opera and animated film, Dagg is a pirate, crystal smuggler, and sidekick to the protagonist. Some have said he "resembles Burt Reynolds but behaves like Harrison Ford's Han Solo."
Divatox	Power Rangers Turbo	1997	TV series	In this series, Divatox is an intergalactic space pirate and villain. In the 1997 film, she is seeking his golden key to traverse an inter-dimensional gateway and enter into matrimony with Maligore, an imprisoned demon who promises her great riches and power.
Cyborg Dwayne	Cleopatra in Space	2020–present	Animated TV series	The doppelgänger of protagonist Brian Bell who is also on the pirate ship with Ostea, Boop, and Amsaja.
Queen Emeraldas	Queen Emeraldas; Galaxy Express 999; Space Pirate Captain Harlock	1978–1979; 1977–1981; 1977–1979	Manga	Spinoff character from Galaxy Express 999 (Note: First a manga, then an anime, and OVA, along with several films.) and Capt. Harlock in Leiji Matsumoto universe. Sister of Maetel from GE999. In the manga, ahe comforts the series protagonist, Hiroshi Umino, who escapes Earth on a freighter, and is fascinated by him, as she fled Earth in the past to a ship which she designed herself. Additionally, Emeraldas shows up in the animate films Galaxy Express 999 (1977) and Space Battleship Yamato (1974).
Gavro; Foolscap; Sheer	Ancient Ruler Dinosaur King DKidz Adventure	2007–2008	Animated TV series	Gavro, Foolscap and Sheer are members of the "spectral space Pirates" and collect cosmos stones throughout time.
Gokaigers	Kaizoku Sentai Gokaiger	2011–2012	TV series	Characters from a Super Sentai series who travel to Earth in search of the "Greatest Treasure in the Universe", only to be dragged into a battle with an invading alien force called the Space Empire Zangyack.
Hammerhand	ThunderCats; ThunderCats Roar	1985–1989; 2020–present	Animated TV series	The leader of the Berserkers who has a cybernetic arm that can punch and pound with great force. After he and his original Berserkers were killed, Hammerhand was later mystically resurrected by Mumm-Ra who summoned up his spirit to animate a clone of Panthro which he had created. When the plan failed, Hammerhand's spirit broke Mumm-Ra's control and the clone body shifted into Hammerhand's original form before departing. Other Berserkers are Topspinner, Ram Bam, and Cruncher, all of whom are "gold-loving" pirates and all cyborgs.
Captain Harlock	Space Pirate Captain Harlock	1978–1979	Anime series	Captain of the Arcadia. The character was created by Leiji Matsumoto in 1977 and popularized in the 1978 television series Space Pirate Captain Harlock. Since then, the character has appeared in numerous animated television series and films, like Arcadia of My Youth, the latest of which is 2013's Space Pirate Captain Harlock. Harlock has achieved notable popularity. Several anime and manga characters have been, in some way, inspired by Matsumoto's creation. Naoko Takeuchi drew inspiration from Harlock's stoic qualities ("strong, silent, unshakeable") when designing the character of Tuxedo Mask, while Last Exile's Alex Row was modeled after the Captain. His basic character design is even thought to be a source of inspiration for Osamu Tezuka's manga character Black Jack.
Captain CJ "Hawk" Hawkens	Space Raiders	1983	Film	Roguish protagonist of this Roger Corman's dark spin on Star Wars in this space opera.
Tex Hex	BraveStarr: The Movie	1988	Film	This animated Space Western, based on the animated series of the same name, has an evil purple-skinned outlaw, minion to the demon Stampede.
Ironwolf	Weird Worlds	1972–1974; 2011	Comics	Antihero resisting the tyrannical Empress Hernandez. He first appeared in the last three issues of Weird Worlds, a comics anthology series published by American company DC Comics from 1972 to 1974. and was created by Howard Chaykin, who plotted and drew the stories.
Jackals	Halo 2	2004	Video game	A sci-fi race of reptilian-like creatures who are notorious for piracy in space in this video game.
Murdoch Juan	"The Pirate"	1968	Novel	A bold space adventurer in this story, which is part of The Psychotechnic League series. Whether Murdoch is to be actually defined as a pirate, or rather as a very daring but legitimate entrepreneur, is a major issue on which the whole story turns. In another one of his stories, the pirates are desperate to destroy the protagonist "before he can bring the information to the authorities."
Drongo Kane	John Grimes novels	1967–1976	Novel series	A pirate captain who is the villain in several books, comes from the planet Austral, and other books mention the planet Australis in another part of the galaxy. His story "The Mountain Movers" (part of Grimes' early career) includes the song of future Australian space adventurers, sung to the tune of "Waltzing Matilda." The Duchy of Waldegren is also a popular haunt of several notorious space-pirates (no individual names given) in the series.
Killer Kane	Buck Rogers in the 25th Century A.D.	1929–1967	Comic strip	Flamboyant 25th century crime boss, later dictator of earth and Saturn, with a fleet of spacecraft and raygun-toting henchmen who appeared in the Buck Rogers comic strip and its subsequent 1939 Buck Rogers serial film produced by Universal Studios, the 1979 film and subsequent TV series. Some reviewers believe that when measured against other serial villains such as Ming the Merciless, Killer Kane pales somewhat in comparison.
Talon Karrde	Thrawn trilogy	1991–1993	Novels	Karrde is a smuggler chief who becomes the leader of the criminal underworld after the death of Jabba Desilijic Tiure. The author of the trilogy, Timothy Zahn, said that when he created the character he "always envisioned the face and voice of Avon" from Blake's Seven.
Kraiklyn	Consider Phlebas	1987	Novel	Captain of the pirate ship Clear Air Turbulence, an avid gambler who leads his crew on two disastrous raids before being killed by the main character Horza.
Krys and Jolly U	Alisa Selezneva	1965–2003	Novels	Krys is a shape-shifter, and Jolly U is a fat humanoid. They appear as Alisa's antagonists in several books and their adaptations, such as The Mystery of the Third Planet and Guest from the Future.
Duelo McFile	Vandread	2000-2001	Anime series	Duelo quickly takes over medical emergencies often at the objection of the female pirates, but ignores them, assuring the crew members that he is not a threat. Since he is the only licensed medical practitioner on board the Nirvana, as well as being that the medical facilities on board the female pirate ship were no longer operational, the female pirates were left with no choice but to have him as their official doctor.
Manjanungo	Race Across the Stars	1982–1984	Novel	A bloodthirsty space pirate in this novel, which is part of the Spaceways series.
Mito	Space Pirate Mito	1999	Anime series	Mito masquerades as a fashion model, but is actually a legendary space pirate.
Nabel	"Space Truckers"	1996	Film	A scientist who is later revealed to be a pirate captain of the Regalia named Macanudo, who rebuilt his grievously injured body and went into piracy as revenge against Saggs for betraying him.
Carson Napier	Venus Series	1932–1962	Novels	A dashing space-traveler, got to Venus by mistake, discovered there a tyrannical regime which sorely needed opposing – and the best way to do that was to assume leadership of the Pirates of Venus (also the title of the first book in the Venus series).
Hondo Ohnaka	Star Wars: The Clone Wars; Star Wars Rebels	2008–2020; 2014–2018	Animated TV series	Leader of the Weequay space pirates, (Note: He was also called a "sassy space pirate" by Robert Nairne, who voiced him in a Disneyland display.) known as the Ohnaka Gang, which kidnaps, and attempts to ransom, Obi-Wan Kenobi, Anakin Skywalker, Count Dooku—and later Ahsoka Tano—to the highest bidder during the Clone Wars. He follows a code of honor and respects the Jedi, but is not above using sneaky tactics and treachery if it is for "good business". Years after the Clone Wars, despite losing his crew to the Galactic Empire, Hondo continues his criminal activities while having dealings with the Rebellion crew of the Ghost.
Orions	Star Trek: The Animated Series	1973–1974	Animated TV series	The first appearance of a male Orion was shown in the Star Trek: The Animated Series episode "The Pirates of Orion". In the episode, these Orions are shown to be ruthless pirates, As such, some recommended this episode for featuring the trio of characters Kirk, Spock, and Bones of The Original Series. Later, the Orion Syndicate was mentioned in Star Trek: Deep Space Nine, but no actual Orions were seen, only members of other species.
Ostea	Cleopatra in Space	2020–present	Animated TV series	A doppelgänger of series protagonist Akila Theoris, she is a pirate in the same crew as Cyborg Dwayne and Amsaja. She is a pirate who apparently edits, or a major contributor, to a newsletter for space pirates.
Red Peri	The Red Peri	1935	Novel	In this novel where some said that "the background is imaginative, but the romance is on the level of the shopgirl pulps, and the writing leaves much to be desired," with David Bowman's helmetless spacewalk in 2001: A Space Odyssey inspired by Frank Keene's escape from the pirate base the novel. Peri is the novel's protagonist and space pirate who has a base on the Moon.
Pirate Clans	Exosquad	1993–1994	Animated TV series	In the first season of this series, a group of humans defend their homeworlds from attack when under attack from these rogue pirates and humanoids, a theme which continues in season 2.
Malcolm "Mal" Reynolds	Firefly	2002	TV series	Former rebel Browncoat soldier and captain of Serenity, who has been described as someone that is "everything that a hero is not." He is a survivor who tries to stay alive and get by, raised by his mother and "about 40 hands" on a ranch on the planet Shadow. He occasionally surprises his friends by displaying familiarity with disparate literature varying from the works of Xiang Yu to poems by Samuel Taylor Coleridge, though he has no idea "who" Mona Lisa is.
Ridley	Metroid	1986–2017	Video game	A dragon-like alien that is a top ranking member of the space pirates.
Saffron	Firefly	2002	TV series	She is a very crafty and amoral con artist who assumes convenient identities to commit grand thefts, is known to seduce—and frequently marry, and an occasional ship thief.
Sally	Fallout 3	2008–2009	Video game	A child victim of alien abduction who helps the Vault Dweller take over Mothership Zeta, destroy an enemy flying saucer, and plunder the aliens' advanced technology. The rest of her crew include the samurai Toshiro Kago, the mercenary Somah, doctor Elliot Tecorian, and the cowboy Paulson.
Star Seekers	Transformers: Exiles; Transformers: Retribution	2011; 2014	Novels	Transformer Pirates with a vendetta against Cybertron led by Thundertron, even appearing in the 2014 storyline for BotCon. Thundertron also appeared as a figure in the Transformers: Prime toyline. Reportedly, Transformers Prime would have introduced pirates if it has continued. Also, there was the Dread Pirate Crew which appeared in Transformers: Wings Universe, a universe based on the original cartoon, depicted in comics, and prose stories.
Garris Shrike	Han Solo Trilogy	1997–1998	Novels	Space pirate, con artist, and mercenary who captured Han Solo as a child, turning him into a thief, while serving as his mentor. A similar character named Tobias Beckett appeared in the Solo: A Star Wars Story film.
Space Pirates	Kid Icarus: Uprising	2012	Video game	Futuristic, seemingly mechanical beings, and antagonists. They act as enemies of Pit and the Underworld Army where they roam the Galactic Sea and steal the constellations. Besides the generic Space Pirates, among the members of the Space Pirates are the Space Pirate Captain, Space Pirate Commando, and Space Pirate Sniper. They are reportedly called "Star Thieves" in Japan.
Richard B. Riddick	The Chronicles of Riddick	2004	Film	Escaped convict and last of the alien Furian race. Riddick was once a mercenary, then part of a security force, and later a soldier.
Jonathan Rockhal	Nathan Never	1991–present	Comics	A space pirate captain. John Silver, whose name was inspired by Long John Silver, a man with a mechanical leg, is his second-in-command, who appeared in these comics. Before they turned to piracy, they were generals of the Federal Army of Earth. Also in the comic series is a former space pirate named Madoc, a friend of Rebecca "Legs" Weaver, a colleague of the protagonist.
Sinbad and the Space Pirates	Challenge of the Super Friends	1978	Animated TV series	Space pirates come to Earth to loot its treasure in the second part of episode 4.
Han Solo	Star Wars: Episode IV – A New Hope	1977	Film	A pirate, mercenary and spice smuggler, best friend to the dog-like alien Chewbacca and lover to Princess Leia. In designing Solo, George Lucas used Humphrey Bogart as a point of reference, with Solo developing into a "tough James Dean style starpilot" that would appear in the finished film. After his appearance in a New Hope, he also appeared in Star Wars: Episode V – The Empire Strikes Back in 1980, Star Wars: Episode VI – Return of the Jedi in 1983, Star Wars: The Force Awakens in 2015, Solo: A Star Wars Story in 2015, and Star Wars: The Rise of Skywalker in 2018, along with in the Star Wars Holiday Special, the Star Wars Forces of Destiny series, and many other parts of the Star Wars franchise.
Elon Cody Starbuck	Star Reach	1974–1979	Comics	In this 1970s comic, Starbuck is a "rollicking space pirate" and swashbuckler who was sometimes a hero, and other times a villain who has some redeeming qualities. Some have also said that Lieutenant Starbuck in Battlestar Galactica was based on Starbuck in this comic series.
Starjammers	Uncanny X-Men	1963-2019	Comics	A team of space pirates, led by Corsair, appearing in American comic books published by Marvel Comics. The Starjammers first appeared in Uncanny X-Men #107 (October 1977) and were created by Dave Cockrum. The name "Starjammers" was created on the basis of the type of sailing ship known as "Windjammer".
Booster Terrik	X-Wing	1996-2012	Novels	Terrik was a criminal who was imprisoned by protagonist Corran Horn's father, as well as an old friend of another protagonist Wedge Antilles. Later in the series, Horn marries Terrik's daughter Mirax, despite Terrik's initial objections.
Alonzo P. Tucker	Lost in Space	1965–1968	TV series	Inspired by Long John Silver, especially as portrayed by Robert Newton in this series, which was "aimed primarily at children." He is introduced in the episode "The Sky Pirate" as a human rogue of sorts, and is clearly defined as a space pirate by TV Guide.
Gammis Turek	Vatta's War	2003–2008	Novels	Formerly a little-known gang boss based out of Woosten, though thanks to time and planning he becomes leader of the biggest pirate organization in the history of the universe, as shown in the last three novels of the series, Engaging the Enemy (2006), Command Decision (2007), and Victory Conditions.
The Star Pirate	Planet Comics	1940–1953	Comics	Called the "Robin Hood of the space lanes," looked very much like the DC Comics hero Starman, and appeared between issues #12 and #64. Among several artists, George Appel produced a dozen early issues, while the bulk of issues #33–51 were drawn by Murphy Anderson, whose additions transformed the Pirate into "an almost completely new strip." Three late issues (#59–61) are credited to newspaper comic strip artist Leonard Starr.
Unnamed	Barbary Station	2017	Novel	A pair of engineers join a group of space pirates but the engineers work to "take down a sinister AI" so they can gain the trust of the crew.
Magno Vivan	Vandread	2000–2001	Anime series	The commander of the pirates and everyone addresses her as Boss (Okashira in the Japanese version, which was translated as "captain"). She sees her crew as her children and she hold them in high esteem, also she hold a picture of any of the crew who have left/died displayed when Gascogne apparently dies and she places her picture inside the cabinet.
Mark Watney	The Martian (Note: Also a book of the same name)	2015	Film	Watney, a botanist, notes with some glee that his plan to commandeer a NASA lander without explicit permission, as part of his rescue from being stranded on Mars, under his interpretation of applicable laws means that he is history's first "space pirate": citing that due to the Outer Space Treaty Mars is considered international territory, and citing that under the Law of the Sea, he is essentially hijacking a vessel without permission in international waters, "which, by definition, makes me a pirate." Other analysts have argued that he technically wasn't committing an act of piracy, however, due to the facts that 1 – it has not yet been explicitly established if the same laws for international waters apply to international territory such as Mars or Antarctica, 2 – "Piracy" explicitly refers to robbery by force from a crew, not "theft" of an uncrewed vessel as Watney did, and 3 – under space law, the vessel Watney was stealing would be considered U.S. territory and NASA property, and Watney was already a U.S. NASA astronaut.
Yondu	Marvel Super-Heroes; Guardians 3000	1967–1982; 2014	Film	An alien space pirate and mercenary who is a founding member of the Guardians of the Galaxy. A second incarnation of Yondu was introduced in the Earth-616 continuity and modeled after the Marvel Cinematic Universe incarnation of the character; this version of Yondu was identified by writer Sam Humphries as "the great, great, great, great, great, great, great grandfather of the Yondu in the original Guardians of the Galaxy and Guardians 3000." The Earth-616 Yondu is the leader of the Ravagers, a group of space pirates. Yondu finds Peter Quill when his ship malfunctions and strands him on Earth. The Ravagers rescue him as Peter tries to steal his ship, managing to outsmart every member of the crew and capturing Yondu. After Yondu frees himself from his restraints and attacks Peter, he gives him a choice between letting himself be released into space without more trouble or execution. Peter instead asks to join his crew. Yondu is initially skeptical of this idea, but after he learns Peter, like him, is a homeless orphan, Yondu allows him to stay on the ship with the Ravagers as their cleaning boy. Peter uses the opportunity to learn everything he can from space. Later, Yondu makes him an official Ravager.

== See also ==
- The Five Gold Bands
- Roberto Cofresí in popular culture
- Lego Pirates
- Il pirata
- Polly and the Pirates
- Red Seas Under Red Skies
- The Red Seas
- List of pirates
