= Brake (Anderson) =

- Short story by Poul Anderson
- First publication Cover art by Frank Kelly Freas
- Country: United States
- Language: English
- Genre: Science fiction

Publication
- Published in: Astounding Science Fiction
- Publisher: Street & Smith
- Media type: Magazine
- Publication date: August 1957
- Series: The Psychotechnic League

"Brake" is a science fiction short story by American writer Poul Anderson, first published in 1957 in Astounding Science Fiction and reprinted in the collections Beyond the Beyond (1969) and The Psychotechnic League (1981). As a component of the Psychotechnic League future history / alternate history, "Brake" takes place in 2270, as the civilization built up in the aftermath of the 1958 Third World War is being torn between mutually antagonistic factions, on the verge of collapsing into "the day of genocide and the night of ignorance and tyranny".

The story was written and published within two months of "Marius" and they were clearly written as companion pieces - the dawn and sunset of the same culture (later stories of this Future History would be set in the further future, when a still newer civilization would arise from the ruins of what would be called "The Second Dark Ages").

Marius and Brake are linked by various common themes - one featuring the first appearance of the maquis Stefan Rostomily, the other having the last appearance of Rostomily's cloned "sons"; in one Étienne Fourre appears for the first time, in his heroic effort to restore the shattered world, in the other the memory of Fourre is abused and his legacy is claimed by one of the militant factions busily working to shatter it again. In fact, it is Captain Banning, the story' protagonist, who is Fourre's true heir, bravely striving to preserve, for as long as possible, what Fourre and his companions had built.

== Social and political background ==
The entire plot is set on board a spaceship bound for the moons of Jupiter, but it is directly related to the deep crisis and malaise of Earth's social and political system, a "civilization about to go under".

While science and technology eliminated poverty and provided material plenty to all, they failed to resolve humanity's deeper needs. With machines doing much of the work, most people are unemployed - and while materially provided for, feel frustrated and alienated, an issue featured prominently in "Quixote and the Windmill" and "What Shall it Profit?".

This led to the rising of the anti-technological ideology known as "Humanism", whose followers seized dictatorial power in 2170. Though eventually defeated ("Cold Victory") and the democratic government of the Solar Union restored, the underlying problem was not resolved but in fact grew worse. Earth's soul had been scarred by the Humanist episode, and a century later, there is a "civilization-splitting tension, wrung daily one notch higher". Being for or against Science and Technology is the hottest of politically controversial issues, with the struggle between numerous mutually antagonistic political and religious factions carried out not only via psychodynamics, telecampaigning and parliamentary maneuver but also by "knives in the night".

The schism is often perceived in simplistic geographic and cultural terms of "Oriental Kali worshipers versus a puritanical protechnological Occident". However, as the story's protagonist points out, the adherents of Kali the Destroyer, a mutated form of Hindu mythology, are only one branch of the Ramakrishian Eclectics; there are many Asians who support birth control and Technic civilization, while some American professors are fanatical Kali worshippers; the Western New Christians oppose science while the Eastern Husseinite Muslims support it; and so on. Of major importance to the story are the influential and well-funded Western Reformers - in fact no reformers but utterly ruthless fanatics, who would stop at nothing in their efforts to "end the government's spineless toleration of the Kali menace in the East and the moral decay in the West".

The Psychotechnic Institute, which in earlier centuries subtly "guided" and manipulated the government and sought to prevent such polarization, had become corrupt and discredited and was not restored after the fall of the Humanists. Its last members degenerated into themselves becoming a fanatic exile faction on Ganymede seeking to seize power by breeding a mindless loyal army of genetically modified troops. The Institute's place was partly taken by the Order of Planetary Engineers, a secretive "quasi-military, almost religious" organization based at a castle on the edge of Archimedes crater on the Moon. With its members known as capitalized "Engineers" and bound to contract no formal marriage as long as they are on active duty, it has some characteristics reminiscent of the Free Masons and of the Military Orders of Medieval knights. Among the Engineers are also found the last of the Rostomily clones. Though basically concerned with physical nature and the terraforming of worlds, and officially neutral in politics, the Order maintains an Intelligence arm and an unofficial symbiosis with the Solar Union's Guard.

The above polarization does not spread beyond Earth, with colonists in space well aware that it was science and technology which created the very environment where they live. It is assumed that, whatever cataclysm would eventually engulf Earth, the space colonies would not be seriously touched by it, assuring humanity's survival.

Luna City on the Moon is a cosmopolitan metropolis. The terraforming of Venus - a dream of the oppressed earlier colonists depicted in "The Big Rain" - had come true and, freed of a dictatorial regime, the Venusians reverted to a clan society reminiscent of the Scottish Highlands (they habitually wear kilts and glengarries). Though sometimes engaging in bloody vendettas, Venusian violence is relatively innocuous compared with that of Earth. Mars is also terraformed, its moon Phobos being an important station on the space routes.

The newest of humanity's outposts are the terraformed Jovian moons Ganymede and Callisto, and Europa is due to be. The as yet poor and backward Jovian Republic - reminiscent of early Australia - has recently established its University of X, "X" being the name of the main city and spaceport on Ganymede. Its inhabitants have developed their own dialect of English ("Missed y' 'gain. Do' know 'f we c'n come near, nex' time").

As noted previously, the catastrophe which would eventually engulf Earth did not seriously touch these space colonies. The point reiterated in this story, as in much of Anderson's other fiction and non-fiction writings - is that space exploration and colonization is not an unnecessary "luxury" or "waste," but instead essential for humanity's very survival.

== Plot summary ==
"The Thunderbolt" is a spherical space freighter, 300 meters in diameter. She is capable of reaching the Jovian moons in less than a month. The flip side is that since her speed is greater than the solar escape velocity, should anything prevent "The Thunderbolt" from decelerating, she would go on forever into interstellar space, and all on board would die when supplies run out. For most of her voyage, she is out of radio range and cannot call for help; her crew must deal by themselves with any emergency.

Captain Peter Banning is a veteran spaceman with experience in hand-to-hand fighting (especially in zero gravity conditions). He has considerable intellectual curiosity and knowledge of ancient history subjects as Weimar Germany and the struggle between Nazis and Communists. Having observed the deteriorating situation on Earth, he has bought a ranch on Venus to serve as his refuge.

"The Thunderbolt" sets out with a cargo of terraforming equipment for Europa. Banning strikes up a friendship with Planetary Engineer Luke Devon, with whom he shares an enthusiasm for Shakespeare. A budding love relationship develops between Devon and Cleonie Rogers. Banning has some vague suspicion about the ship's four other passengers, but nothing concrete. In fact, the four are members of the fanatic "Western Reformers" and plan to take over the ship. The "Reformers" have started a secret asteroid base, which they plan to use to build a fleet of nuclear-armed ships and launch a surprise attack on Earth. To build up the base, they need a big, fast space freighter like The Thunderbolt, along with its cargo of terraforming equipment.

Devon - a clone of the Rostomily Brotherhood, whose struggle to help unite the Earth two centuries earlier was described in "Un-Man" - recognizes Serge Andreyev, one of the four passengers, as a former Engineer who had been expelled from the Order, and confronts him - whereupon Andreyev pulls a gun. Captain Banning comes upon the two and manages to free Devon. The conspirators are forced to launch their takeover of the ship ahead of schedule. Captain Banning remains at large and manages to free and rally his crew. They are hampered by the "Reformers" having all the firearms. Banning turns off the artificial gravity, giving them a tactical advantage over the conspirators. Luke and Cleonie manage to kill three of the four would-be hijackers, though Luke is severely wounded. Professor Gomez, leader of the Reformers' group, holes up in the ship's engine room and demands the crew's surrender. From Devon's knowledge of the "Reformers", the Captain concludes that he and his crew would be killed at the conspirators' asteroid, and that they have nothing to lose. They cut through the partitions, get into the engine room and kill Gomez - who has already flushed a large part of the reaction mass into space.

The remaining reaction mass is too little to stop the ship from leaving the Solar System. It is, however, enough to send it on a course through the atmosphere of Jupiter, where friction will slow them down. They lighten the ship by removing and jettisoning all internal partitions, as well as all but the most essential gear. After the last of the reaction mass is used, the ship's engine is also cut off and jettisoned. The maneuver is a partial success; the ship sheds most of its velocity, but it left floating in the atmosphere of Jupiter. The crew is hopeful. The group is hopeful that their rescuers will arrive from Earth.

== Themes ==
The story introduces the theme of protagonists aware that their culture is nearing an inevitable collapse and a "Long Night" and who nevertheless strive, with great courage and sacrifice, to "halt the Norns" - even if for only one more generation. The same basic premise would be the basis of Anderson's later Dominic Flandry series.

The next story in the series, Gypsy, takes place several hundred years later, when a new civilization had arisen out of the ashes of the Second Dark Ages and is already in possession of FTL ships. There is thus no information on how much time the heroic struggle of Captain Banning and his crew bought for the embattled Earth, how the final catastrophic collapse happened, or whose action touched it off - the Western Reformers, their Kali foes, some other factions or all of them together. Also Sandra Miesel, who closed up many gaps in this future history, did not concern herself with this one. The underlying assumption is that the civilization was moribund, and it is of secondary importance to point out exactly who struck the final blow.

== Influence on Donald Moffitt ==
Donald Moffitt, in the preface to his 2003 novel Jovian, noted the difficulties which Jupiter's gravity and atmospheric pressure make for Science Fiction writers trying to realistically place humans in that environment. He remarked that Anderson's Brake was among few "ingenious stories about brief visits to Jupiter", with a "spaceship bobbing like a cork in Jupiter's upper atmosphere until it could be rescued". Moffitt's own novel featured a human colony permanently "bobbing like a cork in Jupiter's upper atmosphere"; Moffitt provided plausible economic reasons why establishing and maintaining such a colony could be worthwhile for a future space-faring civilization.
