= Entity (short story) =

- Short story by Poul Anderson and John Gergen
- Country: United States
- Language: English
- Genre: Science fiction

Publication
- Published in: Astounding Science Fiction
- Publisher: Street & Smith
- Media type: Magazine
- Publication date: June 1949

Chronology
- Series: The Psychotechnic League
The Peregrine	Symmetry

"Entity" is a science fiction short story by American writers Poul Anderson and John Gergen, which appeared in the June 1949 issue of Astounding Science Fiction. "Entity" was the fifth story published by Anderson, and the only story published by Gergen, a friend of him from the Minneapolis Fantasy Society.

== Plot summary ==
The interstellar scout ship Diogenes has discovered an ancient, deserted alien outpost on an airless planet. The most puzzling object at the outpost is a featureless black sphere resting on a concrete pedestal that instantly drains all power from any device that is exposed to it. The sphere is impervious to all attempts to study it, and when the crew of the Diogenes attempt to lift it off its pedestal with a levitation machine, it shorts out their ship's main generators. Repairing the generators will require weeks, and morale is already low when the ship's biologist hypothesizes that the sphere is actually a sentient entity which is actively resisting them. The captain thinks this unlikely, but decides that they will have to remain on the planet until they understand what the sphere is. In the meantime, to raise morale, the captain orders the crew of the Diogenes to get roaring drunk.

During the party, the ship's planetographer drunkenly complains to the captain that an electrical apparatus he was working on blew out when they were trying to lift the sphere. This leads to a moment of drunken clarity for the captain: the sphere, he realizes, is actually a power broadcaster. It absorbs energy of all sorts, including potential energy (which is why it can't be lifted), then converts it with near total efficiency to electromagnetic radiation, broadcasting at a frequency of 30,000 hertz, which happens to be the frequency the planetographer's apparatus was set to receive.

The captain also realizes that they can move the sphere into the ship by simply rolling it off its pedestal onto a levitator and carrying it, as long as they make no attempt to lift it against the planet's gravity. Once it is in the ship, they can surround it with energy receivers and feed the energy it broadcasts directly into the ship's engine, which should give the ship enough power to move it. Once the scientists on Earth work out the sphere's operating principles, they will be able to duplicate it and use it to power Earth's civilization.

== The Psychotechnic League ==
Anderson listed "Entity" as part of the Psychotechnic League series in a timeline published in the Winter 1955 issue of Startling Stories, but it was not included in a later timeline that appeared in the Psychotechnic League collection Starship (1982). Although one character in "Entity" mentions that the discovery of hyperdrive occurred "a few decades" earlier, the Startling timeline has the story take place in 3150, nearly four centuries after the discovery of hyperdrive in the Psychotechnic League universe. The late date may have been Anderson's way of explaining away the absence of the sphere's power broadcasting technology in any of the other Psychotechnic League stories. There is nothing in "Entity" that conflicts with the rest of the Psychotechnic series, but neither is there any positive correlation with it.

== See also ==
- Sphere, a later film about a similar sphere
- The Sentinel, a previous short story that lead to 2001: A Space Odyssey
