= Shallow Bay =

Shallow Bay, meaning a bay lacking depth, may refer to the following:

- Shallow Bay (Newfoundland and Labrador), a bay on the Great Northern Peninsula
- Shallow Bay on Sucia Island, Washington State, USA
- Shallow Bay (Antarctica), in Mac. Robertson Land
- Shallow Bay: The Best of Breaking Benjamin, a compilation album by American band Breaking Benjamin

== See also ==
- Echoes in a Shallow Bay, an EP by Scottish band Cocteau Twins
