= Puppy love =

Feelings of romantic love felt by young people

Puppy love, also known as a crush, is an informal term for feelings of romantic love, often felt during childhood and early adolescence. It is an infatuation often developed by one's looks and attractiveness at first sight. It is named for its resemblance to the affection that may be felt by a puppy. It is commonly associated with feelings of emotional attachment.

The term can be used in a derogatory fashion, presuming the affair to be shallow and transient in comparison to other forms of love. Sigmund Freud, however, believed in the validity of early love, emphasizing "the proverbial durability of first loves".

== Characteristics ==
Puppy love is a common experience in the process of maturing. The object of attachment may be a peer, but the term can also describe the fondness of a child for an adult.

A crush is described as a coming-of-age experience where the child is given a sense of individualism because they feel intimate emotions for a person not part of their own household, and because they were not guided by a third party to these emotions.

== In China ==
In 1950, China promulgated the Marriage Law, which established a new democratic marriage system of monogamy with freedom and equality as the core concept. Among other things, the Marriage Law stipulated that "a man may marry at the age of 20 and a woman at the age of 18." However, since the 1960s, as China's population growth problem became more pronounced and the years of education were extended, the concept of "late marriage and late childbearing" began to be commonly advocated, followed by the formation and stigmatization of the concept of "early love." As late as the 1990s, China continued to crack down on "early love" (Chinese: 早恋) among college students.

After the new marriage law came into effect in 1980, the legal age of marriage in China was adjusted to "no earlier than 22 for men and 20 for women." The act of "early love" was considered contrary to the policy of the time, and was increasingly rejected by social values and equated with "feudal superstition" and "obscenity and pornography".

In recent years, with the change of family planning policy and the gradual opening of the concept of marriage, the age range of "early love" is basically narrowed down to junior high and high school years. However, under the academic pressure of "one exam for life" (Gaokao) and the traditional concept of marriage, schools and parents still have a negative attitude towards the phenomenon of "early love", worrying that it will take up the energy of the children and have a negative impact on their studies and health. Therefore, China's overall social environment does not support early love and is still based on preventive measures. If students are discovered to be in a relationship, the school may intervene depending on the situation.

== Statistics ==
=== Taiwan ===
The 2022 Child Welfare League study of Taiwan students aged 11-15 showed that:

1. Nearly 40% of junior high school students and over 20% of elementary school students said they wanted to fall in love now
2. 32.9% of children said they had fallen in love, up significantly from 26.6% in 2014;
3. 38.7% of the longest relationship lasted less than three months, 59.1% lasted less than six months, and 22.8% of the longest relationship more than one year;
4. 44.5% thought that falling in love could hold hands and hug, 19.7% could kiss, and 4.2% could have sex.

=== China ===
A survey of high school students in a provincial model high school in Sichuan in 2021 showed:

1. 64.9% had not been in love, 27.7% had been in love one to three times, and 6.4% had been in love four to six times;
2. 10.6% were in love, and most of the students who were in love ranked higher in the most recent exam than the last one, different from most teachers' claim that most early love is detrimental to academic performance.

A survey of parents of high school students in Panyu Middle School in Guangdong in 2004 showed that:

1. 23.5% of parents were firmly opposed to adolescent love, 56.6% did not support it, and 16.2% understood it;
2. 13.2% of parents were firmly opposed to high school students dating the opposite sex, 33.8% did not support it, 48.6% did not care or understood it, and 11.8% agreed with it;
3. 43.4% of parents thought that teenagers do not necessarily need heterosexual relationships to grow up;
4. 23.4% of fathers and 12.5% of mothers will interfere and criticize their children after finding out they are in love.

=== United States ===
In the United States, data from National Longitudinal Study of Adolescent Health (Add Health) taken from 1995 to 2002 shows:

1. About a quarter of 12-year-olds report having been in a relationship, and nearly three-quarters of 18-year-olds report having been in a relationship.
2. Female, older, adolescents with step-parents are less likely to have never been in a relationship, and African-American, Asian, and low-income adolescents are more likely to have never been in a relationship, while African-American, low-income adolescents, once in a relationship, tend to skip casual dating and develop a stable relationship.
3. Female, older, adolescents with step-parents were more likely to maintain a stable relationship, while Asian adolescents were less likely.
4. Adolescents who were female, older, and from incomplete or low-income families were more likely to have sexual intercourse with a lover.
5. Female adolescents were more likely to report having emotional intimacy, while African-American and Latino adolescents were less likely. Adolescents with more relationship experiences were significantly more likely to be alone with their lovers, to have sexual intercourse, and to report excellent emotional intimacy.

== Cultural and entertainmental presentation ==
Many works of popular culture, including books, feature films, cartoons and TV dramas frequently depict underage relationships. Western films and television shows also focus on the beauty of underage relationships, which also stimulates the intrinsic motivation of the protagonists to strive to become better for each other, and even achieve a two-way relationship that promotes and supports each other.

In mainland China, homegrown film and television productions tend to avoid underage relationships, but not completely, and occasionally, they end in sadness, thus "conveying to the teenage audience the value of staying away from early love". For example, when the Japanese animated TV series Chibi Maruko-Chan was first broadcast on Chinese television in 2002, the episode related to the emotional development of the male and female protagonists in their early teens did not air in China. Furthermore, the male protagonist's final confession was altered from "I like you" to "I've always thought you were nice". Underage relationships are often the result of long periods of time together and slow accumulation of feelings in mainland Chinese films and television productions, and are often presented as a distraction from important matters and detrimental to the protagonist's life, in which the parents are treated like enemies and the protagonist often gives in and gives up in the face of external obstacles.

== In popular culture ==
- Canadian singer Paul Anka wrote and released the single "Puppy Love" in 1960, reaching number 2 in the Billboard Hot 100.
- The remake by American singer Donny Osmond peaked at number 1 in the UK Singles Chart and number 3 in his native US in 1972.
- Another remake by British pop group and S Club 7 offshoot S Club Juniors (later S Club 8) was featured on their debut album Together in 2002, and was subsequently released as a single that Christmas (as a double A-side with a cover of the Leroy Anderson and Mitchell Parish composition and Christmas standard "Sleigh Ride"), which was a Top 10 hit in Europe, reaching Number 6 on the UK singles chart, with said version also being accompanied by a Christmas-themed music video.
- Country singer Dolly Parton's debut single, released in the 1950s when she was a child, was also called "Puppy Love".
- Singer Barbara Lewis released a song entitled "Puppy Love" in January 1964.
- Australian rock band Front End Loader featured a song called "Puppy Love" on their 1992 eponymous album.
- In 2000, alternative pop/rock band Self featured a song called "Puppy Love" as part of their free, sixth album entitled Selfafornia.
- Bow Wow released a song called "Puppy Love" in January 2001.
- Hip hop artist Brother Ali wrote a song about puppy love titled "You Say (Puppy Love)".
- The electric powwow group A Tribe Called Red released a song titled "Native Puppy Love" on their self-titled album.
- F. Scott Fitzgerald wrote short stories "valuing the intuitiveness of puppy love over mature, reasoned affection...[its] 'unreal, undesirous medley of ecstasy and peace'".
- TV Girl referenced “puppy love” in their 2014 song “Louise” to describe the girl's indifference towards affection.
- Hopper Penn and Paz de la Huerta starred in the 2020 Canadian comedy drama film Puppy Love written and directed by Michael Maxxis.
- In 2023, Nick Fabiano and Richard Alan Reid directed the film Puppy Love starring Lucy Hale and Grant Gustin.

== See also ==
- Attraction (emotion) – Study of the attraction between people that leads to friendship or romance
- Childhood friend – Mutual affection between people
- Childhood sweetheart – Phrase for a relationship between young people
- Infatuation – Intense, irrational attraction
- Limerence – Love madness or intense infatuation
- New relationship energy – State of mind during new relationship
- Teen idol – Celebrities with large youth fan bases
- Unrequited love – Love that is not reciprocated
