= Marius (short story) =

- Short story by Poul Anderson
- Country: United States
- Language: English
- Genre: Science fiction

Publication
- Published in: Astounding Science Fiction
- Publisher: Street & Smith
- Media type: Magazine
- Publication date: March 1957

Chronology
- Series: The Psychotechnic League
—	Un-Man

"Marius" is a science fiction short story by American writer Poul Anderson, first published in the March 1957 issue of Astounding Science Fiction and reprinted in the collections The Horn of Time (1968) and The Psychotechnic League (1981). As a component of the Psychotechnic League future history / alternate history, "Marius" takes place in 1964, six years after the initial nuclear exchanges of World War III. Although it is chronologically the first story in the Psychotechnic League sequence, "Marius" was one of the last to be written. It serves as a prequel to the earlier novella "Un-Man", introducing the character of Étienne Fourre.

== Plot summary ==
In 1964, General Étienne Fourre, once a village apothecary, is the leader of the French Maquisard Brotherhood and serves as France's representative in the Supreme Council of United Free Europe. He is on his way to confront his friend Commandant Jacques Reinach, the chairman of the Supreme Council. Fourre has studied psychodynamics, a mathematical technique for predicting future trends, and he believes that Reinach is leading Europe down a dead-end path. Reinach is sending a tiny delegation to Rio de Janeiro to represent Europe at the relaunch of the United Nations, refuses to establish a parliamentary government, and intends to recognize a neo-fascist dictator as ruler of Macedonia.

Fourre confronts Reinach in his office on the campus of the University of Strasbourg – now used as a makeshift government center – and presents him with an ultimatum: a majority of the Supreme Council have ordered Reinach to step down as chairman. When Reinach refuses, Fourre compares him to the Roman general Gaius Marius, who showed a unique talent as a general and rescued Rome from the barbarian Cimbri, but then proved incompetent in civil politics, inadvertently setting off a civil war that ultimately led to the fall of the Roman Republic. Fourre keeps Reinach distracted with small talk while his men infiltrate the university and stage a coup. As Reinach is about to shoot Fourre, Stefan Rostomily bursts in through his office window and unintentionally kills Reinach.

== Tragic conflict ==
A tragic conflict – a common theme in many Anderson stories – is at the center of this one. Fourre and Reinach are long-time personal friends and comrades-in-arms, who had been through an enormous lot together; even minutes before Reinach's death, they swap anecdotes and reminisces about their carefree younger life in pre-World War III Paris. Throughout, Fourre hopes against hope that Reinach would give in and that it would be possible to call off the armed confrontation; and at the end, he is consumed with remorse and guilt at having caused his old friend's death. So is the young Rostomily, who had admired Reinach and shot instinctively without realizing whom he was killing.

Despite all the above, Fourre had become convinced by Professor Valti, the Finnish inventor of psychodynamics, that Reinach's "rule of thumb" politics, which were enough to conduct the war and free Europe from Soviet occupation, are woefully inadequate to define the course of the post-war world, and that Reinach's mistakes – taken from the best of intentions – could lead the world to a course ending in another nuclear war, fifty years hence, which humanity might not survive. Such considerations are grave enough to override Fourre's personal friendship with Reinach and lead him to the eventually fatal confrontation.

The story thus has no villains, other than the off-stage sinister figure of the "clever and ruthless" Macedonian dictator Pappas. In effect, the struggle between Reinach and Fourre is a struggle by proxy between Pappas – representing the forces of disruption, political extremism, militarism and tyranny which brought about the recent World War III and might bring another one – and Professor Valti, representing world unification in a regime of liberal democracy subtly "guided" by an elite of scientists. Fourre's victory over Reinach (and over Pappas, whom he would overthrow in the immediate aftermath) ensures that the latter would dominate the world for the next several centuries.

== Long term implications and the relation between "Marius" and "Brake" ==
The forces of disruption and destruction have been only temporarily pushed back. As depicted in "Brake" – set centuries later, but actually written by Anderson immediately after "Marius", the two stories being published only two months apart – by the year 2270, ideological and religious fanaticism would once again become predominant on Earth, with two opposing ideological factions emerging, determined to destroy each other and all set to tear apart the world state set up through the efforts of Fourre and his co-workers. Ironically, at least one of these opposing factions would spuriously claim Fourre as its ideological forefather.

The new war which might have happened in about 2010, but for the efforts of Fourre and Valti, does break out three centuries later. Still, not only did humanity enjoy three centuries of (mostly) peace and prosperity, but it had the chance to go into space, become established throughout the Solar System and take its first interstellar steps – so that a war on Earth, however vastly destructive, would not imperil humankind as a whole. This is a cardinal point in Anderson's perception of Humanity's future, reiterated countless times in his fiction and non-fiction writings throughout his career.

== Psychotechnic League ==
"Marius" serves as an introduction to the Psychotechnic League future history. The science of psychodynamics is introduced, as are Étienne Fourre, who will become head of the United Nations Inspectorate, and Stefan Rostomily, whose cloned sons will make up the secret Rostomily Brotherhood. It is also made clear that the new United Nations being established in Rio will be much more powerful than its pre-war incarnation, and will be dominated for the foreseeable future by Western democracies.

== Macedonian flashpoint ==
Macedonia, which serves as the proximate cause setting off the armed confrontation in the story, had been a hotly disputed territory ever since the beginning of the 20th century, due to the incompatible claims of Greece, Bulgaria, Serbia/Yugoslavia and its own Macedonian nationalism.

Most recently, less than ten years before the story was written, much of the fighting in the Greek Civil War of 1946–1949 took place in this area. To judge from his name, the malevolent Papas is Greek rather than a Slavic-speaking Macedonian, possibly a veteran of the civil war who had lain low since 1949. The devastation caused by the 1958 global conflict gave Papas the chance to carve out his "Macedonian Free State", presumably transcending the former borders and taking in parts of pre-war Greek territory ("Aegean Macedonia") as well as those which had been in Yugoslavia and Bulgaria – a plausible enough development given the previous history of this corner of the Balkan, up to the time Anderson wrote the story.
