= Shallow =

Shallow may refer to:

== Places ==
- Shallow (underwater relief), where the depth of the water is low compared to its surroundings
- Shallow Bay (disambiguation), various places
- Shallow Brook, New Jersey, United States
- Shallow Inlet, Victoria, Australia
- Shallow Lake, Idaho, United States
- Shallow Pond (Plymouth, Massachusetts), United States

== People ==
- Hyron Shallow (born 1982), West Indian cricketer
- Parvati Shallow (born 1982), winner of the reality TV show Survivor: Micronesia

== Arts, entertainment, and media ==
- Shallow (album)
- Robert Shallow, a fictional character in two Shakespeare plays
- Verbena (band), later known as Shallow

=== Songs ===
- "Shallow" (Lady Gaga and Bradley Cooper song), 2018
- "Shallow" (Porcupine Tree song), 2005
- "The Shallows", a song by Dog's Eye View from the album Daisy
