= Shallow Bay (Newfoundland and Labrador) =

Bay of Newfoundland

Coordinates: 49.950°N 57.764°W

Shallow Bay is a natural bay near Pistolet Bay, Great Northern Peninsula, off the island of Newfoundland in the province of Newfoundland and Labrador, Canada.
