= Un-Man =

- Short story by Poul Anderson
- Cover art by Pawelka
- Country: United States
- Language: English
- Genre: science fiction

Publication
- Published in: Astounding Science Fiction
- Publisher: Street & Smith
- Media type: Magazine
- Publication date: January 1953

Chronology
- Series: The Psychotechnic League
Marius	The Sensitive Man

"Un-Man" is a science fiction novella by American writer Poul Anderson, first published in the January 1953 issue of Astounding Science Fiction. It was included in the 1962 collection Un-Man and Other Novellas, and the 1981 collection The Psychotechnic League. As a component of the Psychotechnic League future history, "Un-Man" takes place in the year 2004, between "Marius" and "The Sensitive Man".

== Plot summary ==
The story is set at a time after a devastating World War III in 1958, with the world gradually recovering from the devastation. (Chicago is mentioned as having been totally destroyed and there is no intention of rebuilding it; rather, the plan is to totally raze the ruins and use the land for agriculture – pending which, the vast abandoned ruins are being used for all kinds of nefarious activities). The United Nations, re-founded after the war and much stronger than in its earlier incarnation, is in the process of making itself a true World Government. Politics in all countries – including the US – are polarized between "Pro-UN" parties seeking to integrate in this now-global framework and "Anti-UN" ones promoting nationalism and sovereignty and sometimes resorting to violence in resisting the UN. The story is strongly partisan, the United Nations protagonists being the clear "good guys" while the Nationalists opposing them are very much the villains. Anderson later on considerably changed his political positions and regarded this earlier embrace of the UN as part of the liberal views that he had outgrown.

Robert Naysmith is a member of the United Nations Inspectorate, an international police force that neutralizes threats to world peace. He is also a member of the Rostomily Brotherhood, a secret order within the Inspectorate made up of men cloned from Stefan Rostomily, a member of the French resistance during World War III.

Naysmith is ordered to carry on the assignment of Martin Donner, another member of the Brotherhood who was killed while investigating an anti-UN conspiracy. Atypically for a Brother, Donner had a wife and child, and Naysmith's first task is to impersonate Donner long enough to persuade his family to go into hiding with him. Naysmith leaves Donner's wife and son in an isolated cabin in the Canadian Rockies. He then kidnaps and drugs a member of the conspiracy, learning that he has been assigned to assassinate Barney Rosenberg, a Martian colonist who is returning to Earth to retire. Naysmith teams up with a Finnish Brother named Juho Lampi to rescue Rosenberg, and learns that he was a close friend of the original Rostomily.

After leaving Rosenberg with the Donners, Naysmith and his partner arrange to be captured by the conspiracy. They are brought to the secret sea base of Arnold Besser, UN Minister of International Finance and the leader of the conspiracy. They find themselves joined by two more captive Brothers, along with Besser himself. Before Besser can begin torturing Naysmith and the others, the secret base is attacked by UN police, and Besser's bodyguard (actually another Brother, surgically altered to look like Besser's bodyguard) kills Besser and frees the others. Following the raid, the information found in Besser's secret base allows the UN to roll up the conspiracy. Donner's wife tracks down Naysmith and asks him to marry her.

The story is unusual among Anderson's writings in featuring a particularly hideous and disgusting cast of villains, having no redeeming qualities whatsoever, while in most Anderson writings, the antagonists are at least a bit sympathetic and given their own honor and their comprehensible reasons to act as they do. Later, in "The Sensitive Man", Anderson took up many of the themes of "Un-Man", but substituting one of his usual nuanced antagonists.

== Reception ==
In 2003, "Un-Man" was nominated for the 1954 Retro-Hugo Award for Best Novella. Locus's Rich Horton called it "interesting"; however, Evelyn Leeper found it "fairly basic" and "much less appealing and more strident than [Anderson's] non-political [writing]", while noting that the title is a pun ("un-" is both a privative – referring to Naysmith being a clone – and a reference to the UN).
