= The Psychotechnic League =

The 1981 Tor Books edition of The Psychotechnic League.

The Psychotechnic League is a collection of stories set in a future history created by American science fiction writer Poul Anderson. The name "Psychotechnic League" was invented by Sandra Miesel during the early 1980s, to capitalize on Anderson's better-known Polesotechnic League future history. Anderson published 21 novels, novellas and short stories set in this future between 1949 and 1957, with a 22nd published in 1968.

Anderson did not write the stories in chronological order. He included a series timeline in the Winter 1955 issue of Startling Stories to accompany the novella "The Snows of Ganymede".

By the late 1950s, Anderson's political convictions had altered to the extent that he was uncomfortable with the political philosophy implied by the series, and he abandoned it. In particular, he had reversed his earlier strong endorsement for the United Nations as the basis of a world government, an opinion which was the main plot element of several earlier stories in the series.

== Psychotechnic League future history ==
=== In-universe events ===
Anderson's future history begins with a nuclear war during the late 1950s that nearly destroys civilization.

Sandra Miesel wrote a new prologue that was added to the series' republication during the 1980s and formally transformed it from future history into alternate history. Her prologue considered the divergence point from our own history as the (premature) death of U.S. President Dwight D. Eisenhower in 1956 (in our world he died in 1969), and the assumption of power by a younger, less cautious Richard Nixon, which resulted in exacerbation of the Cold War and a devastating nuclear war in 1958.

During the war's aftermath, a science known as psychodynamics is created. Like Isaac Asimov's psychohistory, psychodynamics can be used to predict and guide the future course of social evolution. An organization known as the Psychotechnic Institute is founded during the 1970s that uses psychodynamics to influence government policy and popular attitudes, with the goal of redirecting society towards greater rationality and internationalism. The Psychotechnic Institute assists a reborn United Nations based in Rio de Janeiro to become a world government, and also encourages space colonization. The Order of Planetary Engineers is established on the Moon with the goal of assisting in the terraforming of the Solar System. Early in the 22nd century, as the settlements on the Moon, Venus, Mars, and the Asteroid Belt grow in importance, the United Nations is succeeded by the Solar Union.

By the late 22nd century, the Psychotechnic Institute becomes a victim of its own success. An automated economy has created massive unemployment, which causes the development of an antitechnology philosophy known as Humanism (a term having little to do with the historical philosophy of Humanism, and is indeed in many ways antithetical to it). About 2170, the Humanists seize control of Earth, withdraw from the Solar Union, and abolish the Psychotechnic Institute. The Humanist regime quickly becomes unpopular, and is ended by a popular rebellion aided by Mars and Venus. However, the Psychotechnic Institute is not revived, and, in its absence, technic civilization becomes gradually extremist which results in a new dark age starting during the 24th century.

The Second Dark Ages end during the 27th century, followed by the discovery of a form of faster-than-light travel that results in interstellar colonization and commerce, and the creation of the Stellar Union and its enforcement agency, the Coordination Service.

Eleven of the stories of the Psychotechnic League series occur before the Second Dark Ages, and eleven occur after; none occur during the Second Dark Ages.

The perception of human history as composed of civilizations which develop, flourish, and disintegrate, followed by a dark age and the beginning of a new civilization, was also the basis of Anderson's later future history with the Polesotechnic League followed by the Terran Empire. Specifically, the situation depicted in "Brake" - with the protagonists managing heroically to delay, but unable to prevent, the inevitable destructive ending of their civilization - is similar in some respects to the Dominic Flandry series.

=== Reviews ===
Reviewer Vincent Carter noted that "Like much of the Science Fiction written previous to the advent of actual space programs, Poul Anderson's early future history grossly underestimated the cost in money and material resources of even the smallest and shortest venture outside Earth's atmosphere.(…) In "Marius" we meet Stephen Rostomily as already a combat veteran in a ravaged Europe, where even the basic necessities of life are scarce – and at that, Europe is relatively fortunate, with Russia and China having been reduced to "howling cannibals". Yet in reading "The un-man" we find that that ravaged world had been able to embark on a full-scale colonization of Mars, quickly enough for Rostomily to have spent most of his adult life there. Knowing what we know now about space programs and how much they cost, this is utter nonsense – unless, within a decade or so of the world-destroying war, this timeline managed to achieve anti-gravity or another miracle way of jumping at a low cost out of Earth's gravity well. Which is also highly implausible, to say the least. Otherwise, it is very unlikely that anyone would have conceived of spending scarce resources on space flight, and even the first Lunar landing would have had to wait until much later than 1969.

== Publication history ==
=== Original publication ===
1949

- "The Entity" (with John Gergen), June, Astounding

1950

- "Gypsy", January, Astounding
- "Star Ship", Fall, Planet Stories
- "Quixote and the Windmill", November, Astounding

1951

- "The Acolytes", February, Worlds Beyond

1953

- "Un-Man", January, Astounding
- "The Green Thumb", February, Science Fiction Quarterly
- "The Troublemakers", September, Cosmos
- "The Sensitive Man", November, Fantastic Universe

1954

- "The Chapter Ends", January, Dynamic
- "Teucan", July, Cosmos
- "The Big Rain", October, Astounding
- "The Stranger Was Himself", December, Fantastic Universe

1955

- "The Snows of Ganymede", Winter, Startling
- "What Shall It Profit?", June, If
- "Out of the Iron Womb", Summer, Planet Stories

1957

- "Virgin Planet", January, Venture
- "Cold Victory", May, Venture
- "Marius", June, Astounding
- "Brake", August, Astounding
- Star Ways, Ace

1968

- "The Pirate", October, Analog

=== Subsequent publication ===
The first component of the series to achieve book publication was Star Ways, which appeared as half of Ace Double D-255 in 1957. This was followed by The Snows of Ganymede, half of Ace Double D-303 in 1958, and a paperback edition of Virgin Planet published by Beacon Books in 1959. "Un-Man" was included in Un-Man and Other Novellas as half of Ace Double F-139 in 1962. Star Ways was reprinted by Ace Books in 1978 under the title The Peregrine, and Virgin Planet was reprinted by Baen Books in 2000.

In the early 1980s, Tor Books collected sixteen of the stories (including Virgin Planet), with forewords and intertextual commentary by Sandra Miesel, into three volumes under the general title The Psychotechnic League. The name was an homage to Anderson's better known future history series about the Polesotechnic League, a future interstellar version of the historical Hanseatic League. The third volume also included a modified version of the timeline from Startling Stories. Miesel dealt with the divergence of the fictional 20th century history from actual history by converting the series from future history to alternate history.

- The Psychotechnic League (June 1981)
  - "Marius"
  - "Un-Man"
  - "The Sensitive Man"
  - "The Big Rain"
- Cold Victory (March 1982)
  - "Quixote and the Windmill"
  - "The Troublemakers"
  - "Holmgang"
  - "Cold Victory"
  - "What Shall It Profit?"
  - "Brake"
- Starship (June 1982)
  - "Gypsy"
  - "Star Ship"
  - "Virgin Planet"
  - "Teucan"
  - "The Pirate"
  - "The Chapter Ends"
  - "Chronology of the Future"

Of the six stories not collected in The Psychotechnic League trilogy, "The Entity" and "The Stranger Was Himself", which had been included in the original Startling Stories timeline, were delisted; Star Ways had been published in book form as The Peregrine; and "The Snows of Ganymede", "The Acolytes", and "The Green Thumb" were simply not included.

In 2017/18 Baen issued The Complete Psychotechnic League in three volumes which included all the stories in the timeline.

"The Acolytes" was published in August Derleth's 1953 anthology Worlds of Tomorrow under the title "The Tinkler"; "The Green Thumb" was published in Ivan Howard's 1964 anthology Masters of Science Fiction; and "The Stranger Was Himself" was included in Anderson's 1989 collection Space Folk under the title "Symmetry".

== See also ==
- Question and Answer (novel)
- World War III in popular culture
- Planets in Science Fiction

== Sources ==
- Anderson, Poul, Timeline, Startling Stories, Winter 1955.
- Anderson, Poul, Introduction, The Peregrine, 1978, ISBN 0-441-65954-3.
- Anderson, Poul, Author's Notes, The Psychotechnic League, 1981, ISBN 0-523-48502-6.
- Miesel, Sandra, Chronology of the Future, Starship, 1982, ISBN 0-523-48533-6.
