= The Pirate (short story) =

- Short story by Poul Anderson
- First publication Cover art by Frank Kelly Freas
- Country: United States
- Language: English
- Genre: Science fiction

Publication
- Published in: Analog Science Fiction and Fact
- Publication type: Periodical
- Publisher: Street & Smith
- Media type: Magazine
- Publication date: October 1968

Chronology
- Series: The Psychotechnic League
| Teucan | The Peregrine |

"The Pirate" is a science fiction short story by American writer Poul Anderson that first appeared in the October 1968 issue of Analog. "The Pirate" was a prequel to the earlier Psychotechnic League novel Star Ways (later retitled The Peregrine), and was the last story in the Psychotechnic series to be published. The story was included in the 1975 collection Homeward and Beyond and the 1982 collection Starship, and the timeline from the latter collection places the story in the year 3115.

== Plot summary ==
Trevelyan Micah, an agent of the Stellar Union's Coordination Service, is alerted to some suspicious activity on the part of Murdoch Juan, a Trader with whom Trevelyan has crossed paths before. Murdoch claims to be recruiting settlers for a newly discovered planet he calls Good Luck. However, the cost of building housing and infrastructure for the settlers would make the settlement uneconomical for Murdoch, and the equipment he is loading aboard his ship, the Campesino, seems mismatched for the planet he describes.

When the Campesino sets out, Trevelyan and his alien partner Smokesmith pursue in a smaller, faster ship called the Genji. They follow Campesino to an Earthlike world a hundred light years from the remains of a supernova. Landing on the world, Trevelyan discovers that it once had a race of intelligent natives who were wiped out four centuries earlier when the supernova's radiation front passed by. Their buildings are still mostly intact, and Trevelyan realizes that that is the secret to Murdoch's plan: he won't have to build housing or other infrastructure for his settlers, because he can simply renovate the deserted native buildings. Murdoch stands to become the richest man in the Stellar Union.

Trevelyan confronts Murdoch, and tells him that he must wait until archeological teams from the Stellar Union have thoroughly investigated Good Luck, probably for a century, before he can begin moving settlers in. Murdoch has a counterproposal: Trevelyan will surrender to him, and Murdoch will maroon him alone on a deserted island on Good Luck for ten years while the planet is colonized. Trevelyan responds with his final offer: Murdoch will allow him to leave Good Luck or else Smokesmith will nuke Trevelyan, Murdoch, and the Campesino. After Smokesmith sets off a sample nuke in the atmosphere above them, Murdoch agrees. Trevelyan will return to the Stellar Union and spread the word that anyone who takes up Murdoch's offer and settles on Good Luck will be forcibly removed by the Coordination Service, which should suffice to prevent settlement of the planet.
