= Vatta's War =

Series of science fiction novels by Elizabeth Moon

Vatta's War is a science fiction series by American writer Elizabeth Moon, comprising five books: Trading in Danger (2003), Marque and Reprisal (2004; Moving Target in the UK and Australia), Engaging the Enemy (2006), Command Decision (2007), and Victory Conditions (2008). They have been characterized as military science fiction similar in style to the works of Lois McMaster Bujold (Vorkosigan Saga), David Weber and Walter Jon Williams (Dread Empire's Fall).

The books follow the adventures of Kylara Vatta, a young member of the Vatta family, which runs the interstellar shipping corporation Vatta Enterprises. She had sought a life outside the family business by enrolling in the Slotter Key Spaceforce Academy, but she is forced to resign in her final year and assigned to captain an old trading ship for the corporation. Her military training is put to good use, however, during the crises she faces, first as a ship captain in dangerous situations, and later as the representative of a family under attack.

The first book, Trading in Danger, is narrowly focused on Ky and the local crisis in which she becomes involved. The perspective expands in the later books as connections between piracy and ansible attacks on the one hand and Vatta Enterprises and InterStellar Communications Corporation (ISC) on the other are revealed. In 2017 Cold Welcome was published. It is the first book of the new Vatta's Peace series. It also features Kylara Vatta and is set after the events of Vatta's War.

== Plotlines ==
Trading in Danger
- Ky aboard the bridge of the Glennys Jones.
- Author: Elizabeth Moon
- Cover artist: (United States) Dave Seeley (United Kingdom) Fred Gambino
- Language: English
- Series: Vatta's War
- Genre: Space opera, military science fiction
- Publisher: (United States) Del Rey Books (United Kingdom) Orbit Books
- Publication date: September 30, 2003
- Publication place: USA
- Media type: Hardcover, paperback
- Pages: 304 (hardcover); 357 (paperback)
- ISBN: 0-345-44760-3 (hardcover); ISBN 0-345-44761-1 (paperback)
- OCLC: 53087396
- Followed by: Marque and Reprisal

=== Trading in Danger ===
Kylara Vatta, the daughter of the CFO of Vatta Transport Ltd., a space shipping firm based out of the wealthy world of Slotter Key, is forced to resign in disgrace from the Slotter Key spaceforce academy after she is tricked by another cadet. Hoping to get her out of the limelight and make the best of her skills, her family give the command the old, decrepit freighter Glennys Jones on its final journey to the scrapyards of Lastway. At the young Belinta colony she is told that a sorely needed shipment of agricultural machinery never arrived and a sizable payment is available to anyone who can bring the goods from the Sabine system. Determined to save the Glennys Jones from being scrapped, Ky deviates from the mission in an attempt to gain enough credit to refit the ship.

An engine malfunction strands her at Sabine until she can raise funds to replace critical parts, but the two planets in the system are sliding towards open conflict. Just as she prepares to call home to request funds, the ansibles that link Sabine to outside systems are attacked and mercenary warships from the Mackensee Military Assistance Corporation appear in the system. They board the Glennys Jones and Ky is injured when a young man who had joined her ship at Belinta tries to attack them. After recovering she agrees to host the hostages the mercenaries have taken from the other merchant vessels in the system.

Though conditions aboard ship are crowded and difficult, Ky manages to keep her passengers in line until a group of captains and senior officers mutiny and temporarily gain control of critical ship systems. Ky confronts them and kills the leading mutineers, but only at the cost of her own crewman Gary Tobai. They discover that the mutineers, who have sent the ship off-course and sabotaged the communications system and the ship's emergency identification beacon, are connected in some way with piracy and the destruction of the ansibles. Help finally arrives with the return of the mercenaries, now co-operating fully with the InterStellar Communications ansible monopoly, and Vatta captain Josiah Furman, the bane of Ky's apprenticeship voyage years ago. He attempts to order her to scrap her ship at Sabine and come with him but she refuses. She quickly get funds for full repairs from ISC, which is grateful for her information regarding the pirates, but has to re-register the ship under a new name because of the sabotage to the identification beacon. She chooses Gary Tobai in honor of her late cargo master. The return voyage to Belinta is without incident and the agricultural equipment is delivered in fine shape.

Marque and Reprisal
- Ky in the airlock of the Gary Tobai with the Fair Kaleen in the background.
- Author: Elizabeth Moon
- Cover artist: (United States) Dave Seeley (United Kingdom) Fred Gambino
- Language: English
- Series: Vatta's War
- Genre: Space opera, military science fiction
- Publisher: (United States) Del Rey Books (United Kingdom) Orbit Books
- Publication date: September 28, 2004
- Publication place: USA
- Media type: Hardcover, paperback
- Pages: 336 (hardcover); 378 (paperback)
- ISBN: 0-345-44758-1 (hardcover); ISBN 0-345-44759-X (paperback)
- OCLC: 54685621
- Preceded by: Trading in Danger
- Followed by: Engaging the Enemy

=== Marque and Reprisal ===
This book is called Moving Target in the UK and Australia.

While on Belinta, completing the delivery of her shipment and looking for new cargo to take to Sabine, Kylara Vatta is attacked by trained assassins and an attempt is made to bomb the Gary Tobai. The Slotter Key consul provides assistance, but soon word comes that Vatta ships and facilities have been attacked on Slotter Key as well and the government is distancing itself from the corporation. Soon the Slotter Key ansible fails, leaving Ky unable to ascertain the condition of her family back home. Looking for allies, she hires Gordon Martin, a spaceforce sergeant from the Belinta consulate as cargo master and security chief.

Arriving on Lastway, Ky faces continued attacks but manages to acquire both a personal sidearm and a defensive suite for her ship. She also receives a letter from Master Sergeant MacRobert, an instructor she had known at the Spaceforce Academy. He has sent her a letter of marque and instructions for acquiring some defensive mines to arm her ship.

Meanwhile, on Slotter Key co-ordinated attacks on the headquarters of Vatta transport and the private family compound leave most senior family members, including Ky's parents, dead. Command of the survivors falls to Gracie Lane Vatta who assigns her niece Stella Vatta Constantin to find Ky and give her the cranial implant from her CFO father Gerard Vatta which contains critical family data and codes. Stella heads for Lastway, with the implant concealed in one of Aunt Gracie's infamous fruitcakes, aboard an ISC courier. While stopped briefly at Allray, she discovers young Toby Vatta, who alone has survived an attack on the Vatta ship Ellis Fabery. While dodging assassins on Allray, Toby and Stella run across her old flame Rafael "Rafe" Madestan who agrees to partner with them for the trip to Lastway.

Upon reaching Lastway and finding Ky, they give her an update on the situation and Rafe reveals himself to be the son of ISC president Garston Dunbarger. He agrees that ISC and Vatta interests run together for the present and enters an extended partnership with Ky. She is also contacted by the Mackensee Military Assistance Corporation whose insystem personnel are running dangerously short of funds. She hires them to provide security for herself and ship as she seeks to find and protect surviving Vatta family members. In co-operation with Rafe they assassinate the corrupt local ISC agent and restore ansible functionality in the system. In order to spread the costs of hiring the mercenary force, Ky forms a convoy with three other traders and they set off for Garth-Lindheimer.

At an intermediate jump point in an uninhabited system they detect the ship Fair Kaleen which is registered to Vatta Transport and captained by family black sheep Osman Vatta. It soon becomes clear that Osman is in league with the enemies of Vatta, and Ky devises a plan to foil his attack on the Gary Tobai. She successfully uses her mines to disable the Fair Kaleen, but Osman attempts to re-enter the airlock and plant a mine of his own. Ky orders her crew to direct an EM pulse to disable it (along with critical ship systems) and kills Osman in single combat in zero-g. The mercenaries arrive in time to destroy the pirate ships that Osman has summoned and assist the Gary Tobai in the aftermath of the battle. Ky claims the Fair Kaleen both as stolen property and a prize and transfers over to it along with Martin, Rafe, and a small prize crew.

Engaging the Enemy
- Ky firing a beam weapon (which she never does in the text).
- Author: Elizabeth Moon
- Cover artist: (United States) Dave Seeley (United Kingdom) Fred Gambino
- Language: English
- Series: Vatta's War
- Genre: Space opera, military science fiction
- Publisher: (United States) Del Rey Books (United Kingdom) Orbit Books
- Publication date: March 28, 2006
- Publication place: USA
- Media type: Hardcover, paperback
- Pages: 416
- ISBN: 0-345-44756-5 (hardcover); ISBN 0-345-44757-3 (paperback)
- OCLC: 61123209
- Preceded by: Marque and Reprisal
- Followed by: Command Decision

=== Engaging the Enemy ===
Arriving in the Garth–Linheimer system together with the convoy, Ky finds her title to the Fair Kaleen is in question. She refuses to submit to a legal adjudication of her rights and sets off at once for Rosvirein. Stella, left behind as captain of the Gary Tobai, is furious at Ky for putting her in a situation for which she is not trained without an adequate crew. She hires a shipmaster and pilot and follows as soon as the ship is repaired and reloaded.

On Rosvirein, Ky sells off enough of Osman's presumably stolen cargo to pay for repairs of her own ship and hire crewmen qualified to run the ship's missile and beam weapons. She also hires Hugh Pritang, a mercenary veteran with a prosthetic arm, to be her executive officer now that she has decided to use her letter of marque to justify seeking out and destroying the pirates who have attacked her family. When suspected pirate ships appear in the system, she undocks from the station to avoid being trapped in the event of an attack. The Rosvirein Peace Force orders all undocked ships to leave the system to prevent collusion with the pirates and so Ky is unable to wait for Stella.

At Sallyon, Ky's next port of call, she learns that a fleet of pirates led by one Gammis Turek has attacked Bissonet and forced the planetary government to surrender to them. She attempts to convince other ship captains, including Slotter Key privateer N. W. Argelos, that a concerted response along the lines of a true interstellar space navy is required to defend trade against the pirate threat. The Sallyon government interprets this as rabble rousing and demands that she leave the system. On her way out she passes the Gary Tobai which is inbound and informs Stella of her predicament. Stella, concerned that Ky is no longer focusing on the needs of the Vatta family in her zeal to rid the universe of piracy, is not amused at being left behind again.

Ky delivers medical supplies to the planet Cascadia, the center of the rigidly formal Moscoe Confederation where gross discourtesy carries the death penalty, and waits for Stella to arrive, but before she does, Captain Furman appears and declares that Ky cannot be the real Kylara Vatta, whom he knows to be dead, and must be an impostor planted by Osman. The Cascadian government secures the Fair Kaleen to prevent it from leaving until Furman docks at the station and his claim can be formally adjudicated. Once Stella arrives in system, she is shocked to hear Furman's accusations, but still angry with Ky for leaving her behind and plotting a wild war rather than the rebuilding of the Vatta business empire. While she is on course for Cascadia, both she and Ky independently uncover evidence that Furman has been secretly cooperating with Osman for years. At the trial genetic testing of Stella, Toby, Ky, and a tissue sample from Osman reveals that Ky is not Osman's daughter (as Furman had alleged) — but that Stella is. The court concludes that there is no evidence that Ky has falsified her identity. Furman explodes in anger cursing both Ky and the court and is arrested for making mortal insults. Ky takes possession of the Katrine Lamont and manages to convince Stella that she is the one who needs to run Vatta Enterprises while Ky focuses on organizing effective resistance to the pirate threat.

Argelos arrives to tell Ky that Petrea Andreson, a Bissonet privateer, is organizing a force to attempt to retake that system. Ky, in her newly renamed Vanguard, agrees to join her. During their training, however, they are betrayed and attacked. Andreson and her ally Battersea are killed, but Ky manages to organize Argelos and Pettygrew, another Bissonet privateer, into an effective resistance, and they escape.

Command Decision
- Ky docked at space station.
- Author: Elizabeth Moon
- Cover artist: (United States) Dave Seeley (United Kingdom) Fred Gambino
- Language: English
- Series: Vatta's War
- Genre: Space opera, military science fiction
- Publisher: (United States) Del Rey Books (United Kingdom) Orbit Books
- Publication date: February 27, 2007
- Publication place: USA
- Media type: hardcover
- Pages: 400 (hardcover); 320 (paperback)
- ISBN: 0-345-49159-9 (hardcover); ISBN 0-345-49160-2 (paperback)
- OCLC: 70408090
- Preceded by: Engaging the Enemy
- Followed by: Victory Conditions

=== Command Decision ===
After orchestrating a galaxy-wide failure of the communications network owned and maintained by the powerful ISC corporation, Turek and his marauders strike swiftly and without mercy. First they shatter Vatta Transport. Then they overrun entire star systems, growing stronger and bolder. No one is safe from the pirate fleet. But while they continue to move forward with their diabolical plan, they have made two critical mistakes.

Their first mistake was killing Kylara Vatta's family. Their second mistake was leaving her alive. Now Kylara is going to make them pay.

With a "fleet" consisting of only three ships – including her flagship, the Vanguard, a souped-up merchant cruiser – Kylara needs allies, and fast. Because even though she possesses the same coveted communication technology as the enemy, she has nowhere near their numbers or firepower.

Meanwhile, as Kylara's cousin Stella tries to bring together the shattered pieces of the family trading empire, new treachery is unfolding at ISC headquarters, where undercover agent Rafael Dunbarger, estranged son of the corporation's CEO, is trying to learn why the damaged network is not being repaired. What he discovers will send shock waves across the galaxy and crashing into Kylara's newly christened Space Defense Force (Third fleet) at the worst possible moment.

Victory Conditions
- Ky in command seat of CCC.
- Author: Elizabeth Moon
- Cover artist: (United States) Dave Seeley (United Kingdom) Fred Gambino
- Language: English
- Series: Vatta's War
- Genre: Space opera, military science fiction
- Publisher: (United States) Del Rey Books (United Kingdom) Orbit Books
- Publication date: February 19, 2008
- Publication place: USA
- Media type: hardcover
- Pages: 384 (hardcover)
- ISBN: 0-345-49161-0 (hardcover)
- OCLC: 182631485
- Preceded by: Command Decision

=== Victory Conditions ===
Kylara now has a fleet of significant size, with commitments of additional forces. Stella, on Cascadia, discovers that her ward Toby has become friends with a girl whose father is an agent of Gammis Turek. Realizing that Turek must have more ships to take and hold more systems, Kylara and her team eventually discover that someone has ordered a great many large warships from the shipyards at Moray. This buyer has made progress payments, but Kylara suspects that he intends to steal the ships and rushes to organize her fleet into something that can meet his at Moray. She partially succeeds, denying the pirate lord much of his fleet, but her own flagship Vanguard strikes a minefield and explodes. Her family and friends believe her dead, a fiction she fosters in hopes of catching Turek off guard during a future engagement. Rafael Dunbarger continues to purge ISC of elements in league with Turek or merely incompetent, eventually discovering that this rot reaches into the government of Nexus. His fleet in disrepair due to the machinations of Lewis Parmina, Rafe struggles to salvage enough fighting ships and men to assist in the defense of Nexus. He discovers that his sister, largely recovered from her mistreatment at the hands of Parmina's henchmen, has the strength and wits to assist him in running ISC. He'll need that help, because Turek and his fleet have set their sights on Nexus. If they can conquer it, they will control all galactic communications save for a handful of individuals with semi-portable ansible units. Ultimately, Kylara's new Space Defense Fleet combines with elements of the ISC fleet, Slotter Key Spaceforce, Moscoe Confederation and ships of the Mackensee Military Assistance Corporation in a huge battle for control of Nexus. There are many losses, but ultimately Kylara confronts a desperate Gammis Turek as he sends his doomed flagship in a suicide run towards Nexus. She manages to break the pirate fleet and destroy the pirate leader, but the actions of Turek have forever changed certain aspects of galactic commerce and interplanetary relations. Rafe and Ky have the chance to pursue their strong mutual attraction. They celebrate victory by having Rafe 'peel a lime' for her (and prepare to show what he can do with a pear).

== Story elements ==
=== Characters ===
==== Main characters ====
- Kylara Evangeline Dominique Vatta: Protagonist of the series, she appears in all five novels as a viewpoint character.
- Gerard Avondetta Vatta: CFO of Vatta Enterprises and father of Kylara. He appears in Trading in Danger and Marque and Reprisal as a viewpoint character.
- Gracie Lane Vatta: Great Aunt of Kylara and maker of the galaxy's most inedible fruitcakes. With a history in security and intelligence from her military past, it was often joked that she was "Vatta's Spy Service". She appears in the 2nd–5th books as a viewpoint character.
- Helen Stamarkos Vatta: Wife of the CEO, Stavros Vatta, and known for her beauty. She is later widowed by terrorist attacks on the Vatta Enterprises Headquarters.
- Stella Maria Celeste Vatta Constantin: Kylara's cousin. Known for her beauty and giving the family's secret access codes to her first lover, she appears in all but Trading In Danger as a viewpoint character. Stella is current Vatta CEO.
- Stavros Vatta: CEO of Vatta Enterprises and father to Stella Vatta.
- Toby Randolph Lee Vatta: 14-year-old technical genius brought under the care of Stella. He is only survivor of the sabotage of the ship Ellis Fabery, the ship on which he was serving his apprenticeship. Tech wiz, Toby is responsible for modifying ship type ansibles.
- Osman Vatta: Family outcast and pirate infamous for being a sexual predator and known to leave illegitimate children everywhere he went. He captained the Fair Kaleen, which was a cargo ship he stole from Vatta Transport, Ltd. when he was kicked out of the company. He is biological father of Stella. He influenced the pirates to target the Vatta family as revenge for his excommunication decades ago.
- Rafael "Rafe" Dunbarger: Spy, thief, and romantic rogue. Rafe is the son of ISC chairman and was banished as part of a long plot to eliminate him from succession to his father's position. Always loyal to the corporation he uses his many technical abilities to reactivate ansibles where he can. He has a history with Stella (a past romantic affair) and falls in love with Kylara later in the series. Rafe has a great deal of practical technical skill in hacking and repairing ansibles, and is one of two people known to have ansible transmission technology as part of his cybernetic chip. Appearing as a viewpoint character in the 3rd–5th books, he is current CEO of ISC.

==== Others ====
- Anders MacRobert: Master Sergeant of Cadets at the Slotter Key Spaceforce Academy.
- Arlen Becker: Former Field Commander and current CEO of the Mackensee Military Assistance Corporation.
- Cally Ray Pitt: Master Sergeant and twenty-eight-year veteran in the Mackensee Military Assistance Corporation
- Gammis Turek: Formerly a little-known gang boss based out of Woosten - though thanks to time and planning – is now leader of the biggest pirate organization in the history of the universe.
- Garston Dunbarger: Rafe's father and CEO of the InterStellar Communications Corporation.
- Gary Tobai: Cargo master of the Glennys Jones, he is killed at Sabine. The ship was later renamed in his honor.
- Gordon Martin: Security chief and cargo master on the Gary Tobai and later Fair Kaleen/Vanguard. He was former Staff Sergeant in the Slotter Key Spaceforce. Gordon dies in the Battle of Moray.
- Hugh Pritang: Kylara Vatta's First Officer on Fair Kaleen/Vanguard. Hugh lost his left arm in his fifth year in a mercenary company, but his advanced prosthetic arm allows him to do more than he could before. He dies in the Battle of Moray.
- Jim Hakusar: A "twenty-three"-year-old stowaway on the Gary Tobai from Belinta, he later becomes a valued bodyguard and crew member only after extensive training from Chief Gordon Martin. Jim dies in the Battle of Moray.
- John Mackensee: Founder of the Mackensee Military Assistance Corporation, often referred to as "Old John" behind his back by those who know him.
- Jon Gannett: Formerly a Master Gunner in Calvert's Company, a small mercenary group that ceased operation with its Commander's passing. He is the leader of the Gannett group which took up residence in the Fair Kaleen/Vanguard as weapons teams for its missile batteries. Jon dies in the Battle of Moray.
- Josiah Furman: Senior Vatta Transport captain who holds the most lucrative trade route, and is prized for his excellent on-time delivery stats. The Katrine Lamont is his ship. Executed for discourtesy by the government of Cascadia, he was revealed to be in league with Osman.
- Lewis Parmina: Garston Dunbarger's protégé and chosen successor to take over ISC as CEO. Parmina is a good friend to the Vatta Family. Revealed to be an ally of Gammis Turek, this causes ISC to suspect the Vatta family as a whole.
- Lee Quidlin: Junior pilot on the Glennys Jones/Gary Tobai and later Senior Pilot on the Fair Kaleen/Vanguard, dies in the Battle of Moray.
- Quincy Robin: Chief of Engineering on the Glennys Jones/Gary Tobai with sixty-plus years of experience, she was in Vatta Transport in her entire life.
- Theodore "Teddy" Albert Driscoll Ransome: The charismatic but popinjay leader of the colorful Ransome's Rangers, a pirate-hunting group based on antiquated ideas of chivalry and honor in war (in his Romantic phase).
- Zori: Toby's girlfriend and daughter of Turek spy on Cascadia.

=== Ships ===
- Bassoon: A warship formerly part of the Bissonet Space Militia captained by Daniel Pettygrew, later becoming a part of the Space Defense Force, Third Fleet led by Kylara Vatta.
- Glennys Jones/Gary Tobai: A small, outdated Vatta Transport freighter with slow engines and no defensive capability. Kylara Vatta was assigned to Captain it to the outer systems to scrap it as a 'milk run' assignment primarily to take her out of the media attention for a year. Ky followed a tradition of 'Trade and Profit' in an attempt to generate enough funds to restore the drive problems and make it hers. With the fall of the Vatta Trade Corporation, the old ship was pressed back into service as a trader and eventually was captained by Stella Vatta after the Fair Kaleen was captured and used as Ky Vatta's flagship.
- Fair Kaleen/Vanguard: An old Vatta Transport ship captained by Osman Vatta and outfitted by him as a well-armed pirate raider. It sacrificed cargo space to equipped 2 forward mounted beam lasers, 8 missile bays and the ability to release mine payloads (about 200). Captured by Kylara Vatta at the end of book 1, the Fair Kaleen was instrumental in allowing ship based ansible communication technology to become known to non-pirates. Captained by Kylara Vatta from book 2 to book 5 it was destroyed in battle at Moray.
- Vanguard II - A Moray heavy military grade warship with fleet command functions captained by Kylara Vatta, that replaces the Vanguard I as flagship.
- Katrine Lamont: Large Vatta Transport freighter captained by Josiah Furman.
- Sharra's Gift: Helmed by Captain Argelos, a former Slotter Key privateer. This ship is a cargo ship fitted for use as a warship, but later becomes a part of Ky's Space Defense Force along with Bassoon. He is now using Sharra's Gift II, same type as Vanguard II.
- My Bess: A merchant trader captained by Solein Harper that traveled in convoy with Kylara Vatta.
- Lacewing: A smallish merchant trader that is faster than Gary Tobai. It is captained by Polly Tendel, who seemed to take a dislike to Kylara Vatta. Lacewing traveled in convoy with Kylara Vatta in the Gary Tobai.
- Beauty of Bel: A merchant trader operated by Sindarin Gold. The ship traveled in convoy with Kylara Vatta in the Gary Tobai.
- Gloucester: A mercenary cruiser operated by the Mackensee Military Assistance Corporation. It is described by a Mackensee officer as "capable of handling anything by major ships of the line".
- Donna Florenzia: A privateer from Ciudad. Captained by Isak Zavala, the ship is destroyed by pirates while warning Kylara Vatta of treachery.
- Belcanto: A privateer from Urgayin. Captained by Ernst Muirtagh, the ship is in league with pirates.
- Cornet: A warship formerly part of the Bissonet Space Militia captained by Simon Battersea.
- Glorious: The lead ship of the 'Space Rangers', it is privately owned ship used to hunt pirates. It is a small, fast and highly maneuverable escort class ship with missile capability. The ship was noted for its colorful and flamboyant exterior which matched the outrageous personality of Captain Theodore "Teddy" Albert Driscoll Ransome, a gaudy self-stylized Romantic on a quest for adventure and glory. The ship joined with Ky Vatta early on for no other reason than 'it would be jolly good fun'. Because of their lack of military discipline, Ky and her captains thought them to be cannon fodder; to everyone's surprise, they actually became effective recon ship for the SDF fleet.
- Mandan Reef, Bailey's Reef, Seegan Reef, and Adelie Reef (heavy cruisers). Rapier, Arbalest, Trebuchet, Warhammer, Scimitar (light cruisers): Slotter Key's military fleet commanded by Admiral Padhjan.

=== Planets and systems ===
- Allray: A planet with a wide array of indigenous lifeforms suited for the exotic. Allray station was later the host of a terrorist attack on the Vatta cargoship, Ellis Fabery.
- Belinta: Newly colonized and primarily agricultural, Belinta is widely considered provincial and uncultured. Its people are known for their subdued fashions and distrust of outsiders.
- Bissonet: A major manufacturing center with a populace desiring art and culinary additives. Its system falls to large groups of pirates later on.
- Garth–Lindheimer: A prosperous and respectable trading station in a system with three habitable planets. Privateers must submit to a lengthy adjudication process in order to keep "prizes" brought in here.
- Gretna: A system that, with the collapse of the ansible network, fell into xenophobia, in-system piracy, and slavery. It is populated heavily by bigots who dislike anyone who is not Aryan in addition to humods.
- Lastway: Near the edge of explored space, Lastway is home to MilMart, a large and reputable military supply store.
- Leonora: Located midway on the route from Belinta to Lastway, it is a developing world that reacts with paranoid fervour to any possible threat, going so far as to close all access to the system and shoot at unarmed traders who came too close at the first sign of problems in the beginning or Moving Target (book 2).
- Moscoe Confederation: A central system with three inhabited worlds. The largest, Cascadia, is known for its arboriform space station and its strict code of conduct which requires perfect courtesy at all times.
- Nexus: One of the biggest and wealthiest systems, and home of the ISC. As such, Nexus II is the communications center for all – or most of – human-occupied space.
- Pulson: A poor system with a nexus of multiple FLT jump points, it was captured by pirates.
- Rosvirein: A "live-and-let-live" world where indiscretions that don't interfere with local citizens are ignored and the criminal element has a large presence. On the other hand, the death penalty is frequently imposed and they do not have an appellate court system.
- Sabine: Contains three inhabited planets, Prime, Secundus, and the mining colony Tertius. The relations between Prime and Secundus have not always amicable due to religious differences. Sabine Prime is the center for the manufacture of basic agriculture, mining, and construction equipment for many of the colony worlds in its sector.
- Sallyon: A wealthy system along lucrative trade routes. The system prefers to be oblivious to any outside threats with superior confidence in their ability to be looked over by pirates. It is later attacked on a trumped-up claim by the pirates as a way of intimidating other systems.
- Slotter Key: Wealthy and technologically advanced, this world is the headquarters of Vatta Enterprises and the home world of the Vatta family. Slotter Key is known for its clement weather and extensive, island-studded oceans.

=== Organizations ===
- Vatta Transport LTD: The Vatta Family Transport Company, formerly one of the largest merchant transport companies with an excellent reputation. One of the targets of the conspiracy, it is headed by Stella's "father" as CEO and Ky's father as CFO. A raid by agents of Gammis Turek (and incited by Osman Vatta) killed many Vattas and badly damaged Vatta Transport early in the saga. New CEO Stella Vatta and other survivors work to rebuild it as a subplot throughout books 2–5.
- Crown & Spears Commercial Bank: Very reputable and secure bank found in most stations and developed planets, it is the bank of preference for the Vatta family.
- InterStellar Communications (ISC): Controls and maintains the Ansible system that makes faster-than-light communication between planets possible. Also it operates a large space fleet to protect its hardware and interests.
- Mackensee Military Assistance Corporation: Perhaps the most respected and widely known mercenary force offering everything from consultancy to medical backup and – if the price is right – warships to fight a war.
- Deepspace Benevolent Association: The official name of Gammis Turek's pirate fleet. In one engagement, however, the group called itself the Blueridge Defense Alliance as a front for an attack.
- Space Defense Force: A multi-system space navy founded by Ky along with captains Pettygrew and Argelos in response to the pirate threat. It eventually gains support from all but the systems that are anti-humod.

=== Technology ===
- Ansible: A means of nearly instantaneous communication. InterStellar Communications operates as a monopoly and controls all ansible relay stations. Such stations function as a network of store and forward message routers. Tampering with such a station, even to repair it, results in fines and occasionally military reprisals by ISC. Because governments depend on the system, they permit this. Smaller ship mounted ansibles and cranial ansibles that are part of an implant are later revealed as being held by Turek's forces and Rafe respectively.
- Humod: A portmanteau of human and modification, this general term describes anything from a person bearing an implant to a person significantly altered for specific work. Alterations include but are not limited to limb and sensory organ replacements and specialized hardware that grants enhanced capabilities.
- Implant: Essentially a personal digital assistant implanted into and connected to the user's brain. An implant may be removed and replaced without surgery, but not quickly. A new implant usually requires an adjustment period. Almost everyone with significant responsibility uses such devices and cannot perform their duties without them. Implants can often connect to nearby equipment, allowing users to exchange data and exert control over their surroundings by thought.
- Skullphone: A personal communications device embedded within the body, usually part of an implant.
- CCC: Central Communications Command. Vanguard I had a smaller portable version (which saved Ky when ship blew), Vanguard II (as military ship) had one built-in from the beginning, located on her bridge.
- FTL drive: Faster-than-light. An FTL trip can take from few days to few weeks, ships' occupants are awake and live normally during the flight, but there is no way to communicate with other ships or planets.

== Cover art ==
Book covers on this page are from the publisher Del Rey. Those from the publisher Orbit have ships on the cover.

== Reviews ==
- Book 1: Trading in Danger SciFi.com Weekly - B+ | SFReviews.net - 3 / 5 | BookLoons.com - 3 / 3 Nowa Fantastyka 2006/11
- Book 2: Marque and Reprisal: SciFi.com Weekly - A | SFReviews.net - 2.5 / 5 | BookLoons.com - 3 / 3
- Book 3: Engaging the Enemy: SciFi.com Weekly - B+ | SFReviews.net - 3 / 5 | BookLoons.com - 2 / 3
- Book 4: Command Decision: SciFi.com Weekly - B+ | SFReviews.net - 3.5 / 5 | BookLoons.com - 3 / 3
- Book 5: Victory Conditions: SciFi.Com Weekly - B+ | BookLoons.com - 3 / 3 Library Journal
