= Poul Anderson bibliography =

Poul Anderson was an American fantasy and science fiction author who was active from the 1940s until his death in 2001.

The following is a list of works by science fiction and fantasy author Poul Anderson.

== Novels and related short stories ==
=== Science fiction ===
==== Hoka ====
- Earthman's Burden (1957) with Gordon R. Dickson
- Star Prince Charlie (1975) with Gordon R. Dickson
- Hoka! (1983) with Gordon R. Dickson

Reissued by Baen as:

- Hoka! Hoka! Hoka! (1998) with Gordon R. Dickson
- Hokas Pokas! (2000) with Gordon R. Dickson

==== The Psychotechnic League ====
- Star Ways (also known as The Peregrine) (1956)
- The Snows of Ganymede (1958)
- Virgin Planet (1959)
- The Psychotechnic League (1981)
  - "Marius"
  - "Brake"
- Cold Victory (1982)
- Starship (1982)

==== Tomorrow's Children ====
- "Tomorrow's Children" (1947) with F. N. Waldrop
- "Chain of Logic" (1947)
- "Children of Fortune" (1961)
- "Epilogue" (1961)
- Twilight World (1961)

==== Technic History ====
The technic history stories embrace a single future history including the Polesotechnic league (Note: Coined by Karen Anderson from Greek pṓlēs 'seller' and tékhnē 'skill'), followed by the Terran Empire and eventually a "long night". Key characters include Nicholas van Rijn, Christopher Holm, David Falkayn and Dominic Flandry. Titles are listed here by their internal chronology.

===== Early period =====
- "The Saturn Game" (1981)

===== Polesotechnic League =====
- War of the Wing-Men (heavily edited original book publication); later issued with the author's preferred text and title as The Man Who Counts (1958). Stranded on an alien planet, facing starvation, Van Rijn's only hope of survival is to end an eternal war between furry "Wingmen".
- Trader to the Stars (1964) (Prometheus Award), collects:
  - "Hiding Place" (1961)
  - "Territory" (1963)
  - "The Master Key" (1964)
- The Trouble Twisters (features David Falkayn, not Van Rijn) (1966), collects:
  - "The Three-Cornered Wheel" (1963)
  - "A Sun Invisible" (1966)
  - "The Trouble Twisters" (also known as "Trader Team") (1965)
- Satan's World (1969)
- The Earth Book of Stormgate (many stories do not feature Van Rijn) (1978). It collects:
  - "Wings of Victory" (1972)
  - "The Problem of Pain" (1973)
  - "How to be Ethnic in One Easy Lesson" (1974)
  - "Margin of Profit" (1956)
  - "Esau" (also known as "Birthright") (1970)
  - "The Season of Forgiveness" (1973)
  - The Man Who Counts (first appearance of the unedited version of War of the Wing-Men) (1958)
  - "A Little Knowledge" (1971)
  - "Day of Burning" (also known as "Supernova") (1967)
  - "Lodestar" (1973)
  - "Wingless" (also known as "Wingless on Avalon") (1973)
  - "Rescue on Avalon" (1973)
- Mirkheim (1977)
- The People of the Wind (does not feature Falkayn or Van Rijn) (1973)—Hugo and Locus SF Awards nominee, 1974; Nebula Award nominee, 1973

===== Terran Empire =====
- The Imperial Stars (2000), collects:
  - Ensign Flandry (1966)
  - A Circus of Hells (1970)
  - The Rebel Worlds (1969)
- The Day of Their Return (does not feature Flandry) (1973)
- Agent of the Terran Empire (1965), collects:
  - "Tiger by the Tail" (1951)
  - "The Warriors From Nowhere" (1954)
  - "Honorable Enemies" (1951)
  - "Hunters of the Sky Cave" (also known as "A Handful of Stars" and We Claim These Stars) (1959)
- Flandry of Terra (1965), collects:
  - "The Game of Glory" (1958)
  - "A Message in Secret" (also known as Mayday Orbit) (1959)
  - "The Plague of Masters" (also known as "A Plague of Masters" and Earthman, Go Home!) (1960)
- A Knight of Ghosts and Shadows (1974)
- A Stone in Heaven (1979)
- The Game of Empire (features a daughter of Flandry) (1985)

===== The Long Night =====
- The Long Night (1983), collects:
  - "The Star Plunderer" (1952)
  - "Outpost of Empire" (1967)
  - "A Tragedy of Errors" (1967)
  - "The Sharing of Flesh" (1968) (Hugo, Nebula)
  - "Starfog" (1967)
- The Night Face (1978). Previously published as Let the Spacemen Beware! (1963). Expanded from the 1960 novelette "A Twelvemonth and a Day".

===== Omnibus reprints =====
(Omnibus reprints of the Nicholas van Rijn and Dominic Flandry series by Baen Books)

- The Van Rijn Method (2008), collects:
  - "The Saturn Game" (1981)
  - "Wings of Victory" (1972)
  - "The Problem of Pain" (1973)
  - "Margin of Profit" (1956)
  - "How to Be Ethnic in One Easy Lesson" (1974)
  - "The Three-Cornered Wheel" (1963)
  - "A Sun Invisible" (1966)
  - "The Season of Forgiveness" (1973)
  - "The Man Who Counts" (1958)
  - "Esau" (also known as "Birthright") (1970)
  - "Hiding Place" (1961)
- David Falkayn: Star Trader (2009), collects
  - "Territory" (1963)
  - "Plus Ça Change, Plus C'est La Même Chose" (1966)
  - "The Trouble Twisters" (also known as "Trader Team") (1965)
  - "Day of Burning" (also known as "Supernova") (1967)
  - "The Master Key" (1964)
  - "Satan's World" (1969)
  - "A Little Knowledge" (1971)
  - "Lodestar" (1973)
- Rise of the Terran Empire (2009), collects:
  - Mirkheim (1977)
  - "Wingless" (also known as "Wingless on Avalon") (1973)
  - "Rescue on Avalon" (1973)
  - "The Star Plunderer" (1952)
  - "Sargasso of Lost Starships" (1951)
  - The People of the Wind (1973)
- Young Flandry (2010), collects:
  - Ensign Flandry (1966)
  - A Circus of Hells (1970)
  - The Rebel Worlds (1969)
- Captain Flandry: Defender of the Terran Empire (2010), collects:
  - "Outpost of Empire" (1967)
  - The Day of Their Return (1975)
  - "Tiger by the Tail" (1951)
  - "Honorable Enemies" (1951)
  - "The Game of Glory" (1957)
  - "A Message in Secret" (1959)
- Sir Dominic Flandry: The Last Knight of Terra (2010), collects:
  - "The Warriors From Nowhere" (1954)
  - "Hunters of the Sky Cave" (also known as "A Handful of Stars" and We Claim These Stars) (1959)
  - "The Plague of Masters" (also known as "A Plague of Masters" and Earthman, Go Home!) (1960)
  - "A Knight of Ghosts and Shadows" (1974)
- Flandry's Legacy (2011) collects:
  - "A Stone in Heaven" (1979)
  - "The Game of Empire" (features a daughter of Flandry) (1985)
  - "A Tragedy of Errors" (1967)
  - "The Night Face" (1978) (also known as "Let the Spacemen Beware!" (1963), a shorter 1960 version was known as "A Twelvemonth and a Day")
  - "The Sharing of Flesh" (1968) (Hugo, Nebula)
  - "Starfog" (1967)

==== Time Patrol ====
1. "Time Patrol" (1955)
2. "Brave to be a King" (1959)
3. "Gibraltar Falls" (1975)
4. "The Only Game in Town" (1960)
5. "Delenda Est" (1955)
6. "Ivory, and Apes, and Peacocks" (1983)
7. "The Sorrow of Odin the Goth" (1983)
8. "Star of the Sea" (1991)
9. The Year of the Ransom (1988)
10. The Shield of Time (1990)
11. "Death and the Knight" (1995)

The shorter works in the series have been collected numerous times over the years, in:

- Guardians of Time (1960, contains 1, 2, 4 and 5; expanded 1981 edition adds 3)
- Time Patrolman (1983, contains 6 and 7)
- Annals of the Time Patrol (1983, contains 1–7)
- The Time Patrol (1991, contains 1–9)
- Time Patrol (2006, contains 1–9 and 11).

The anthology Multiverse: Exploring Poul Anderson's Worlds (2014), in which various SF writers take up themes from Anderson's work, includes three Time Patrol stories by other writers:

- "A Slip in Time" by S. M. Stirling
- "Christmas in Gondwanaland" by Robert Silverberg.
- "The Far End" by Larry Niven.

==== History of Rustum ====
- Orbit Unlimited (Pyramid Books, 1961)—novel, a fix-up of four Rustum stories published in magazines from 1959 to 1961.
- New America (TOR Books, 1982)—collection including four Rustum published 1974–75, with unrelated material
  - My Own, My Native Land—Rustum story first published in the anthology Continuum 1 (1974) edited by Roger Elwood.
  - Passing the Love of Women—Rustum story first published in Continuum 2 (1974)
  - A Fair Exchange—Rustum story first published in Continuum 3 (December 1974)
  - To Promote the General Welfare—Rustum story first published in Continuum 4 (September 1975)
  - The Queen of Air and Darkness, first published in The Magazine of Fantasy and Science Fiction, April 1971; winner of the Nebula Award for Best Novelette (1971), Hugo Award for Best Novella (1972), and Locus Poll Award, Best Short Fiction (1972).
  - Home (1966), first published in the anthology Orbit One. Also published as The Disinherited.

==== Maurai and Kith ====
- Maurai and Kith (1982), collects:

- "Ghetto" (1954)
- "The Sky People" (1959)
- "Progress" (1961)
- "The Horn of Time the Hunter" (also known as "Homo Aquaticus", 1963)
- "Windmill" (1973)

- Orion Shall Rise (1983)
- Starfarers (1998)—Campbell Award nominee, 1999

Related:

- There Will Be Time (1972)

==== Harvest of Stars ====
- Harvest of Stars (1993)
- The Stars Are Also Fire (1994) (Prometheus Award)
- Harvest the Fire (1995)
- The Fleet of Stars (1997)

==== Other novels ====
- Flight to Forever (serialized in 1950, paperback in 1955)
- Vault of the Ages (1952)
- Brain Wave (1954)
- Question and Answer (also known as Planet of No Return) (1954)
- No World of Their Own (1955, reissued as The Long Way Home 1958)
- The War of Two Worlds (1959)
- The Enemy Stars (also known as We Have Fed Our Sea) (1959)—Hugo Award nominee, 1959
- The High Crusade (1960)—Hugo Award nominee, 1961
- After Doomsday (serialized in Galaxy, December 1961 — February 1962 as The Day after Doomsday, book in 1962)
- The Makeshift Rocket (1962) (expansion of "A Bicycle Built for Brew")
- Shield (1963)
- Three Worlds to Conquer (1964) (slightly expanded version of the serial which appeared in the January and March 1964 IF under the same title)
- The Corridors of Time (1965)
- The Star Fox (1965)—Nebula award nominee, 1965, Prometheus Award winner
- World Without Stars (1967)
- Tau Zero (1970) (expansion of "To Outlive Eternity")—Hugo Award nominee, 1971
- The Byworlder (1971)—Nebula Award nominee, 1971
- The Dancer from Atlantis (1971)
- There Will Be Time (1972)—Hugo Award nominee, 1973

NOTE: The future history of this novel includes the Maurai Federation mentioned above.

- Fire Time (1974)—Hugo Award nominee, 1975
- Inheritors of Earth (1974) with Gordon Eklund
- The Winter of the World (1975)
- The Avatar (1978)
- The Boat of a Million Years (1989)—Hugo Award nominee, 1990; Nebula Award nominee, 1989
- Inconstant Star (1991) (Fixup set in Larry Niven's Man-Kzin Wars universe.)
- Genesis (2000)—John W. Campbell Memorial Award, 2001
- For Love and Glory (2003)

=== Fantasy ===
==== King of Ys ====
- Roma Mater (1986) with Karen Anderson
- Gallicenae (1987) with Karen Anderson
- Dahut (1987) with Karen Anderson
- The Dog and the Wolf (1988) with Karen Anderson

==== Operation Otherworld ====
- Operation Chaos (1971)
- Operation Luna (1999)
- Operation Otherworld (1999), omnibus containing Operation Chaos and Operation Luna

==== Other novels ====
- The Broken Sword (1954, revised in 1971)
- Three Hearts and Three Lions (1961)
- The Fox, the Dog and the Griffin: A Folk Tale Adapted from the Danish of C. Molbeck (1966)
- Hrolf Kraki's Saga (1973)—British Fantasy Award, 1974
- A Midsummer Tempest (1974)—Nebula and World Fantasy Awards nominee, 1975
- The Merman's Children (1979)—Locus Fantasy Award nominee, 1980
- The Demon of Scattery (1979) with Mildred Downey Broxon, illustrated by Michael Whelan and Alicia Austin
- Conan the Rebel (1980)
- The Devil's Game (1980)
- War of the Gods (1997)
- Mother of Kings (2001)

=== Historical ===
- The Golden Slave (1960)
- Rogue Sword (1960)

==== The Last Viking ====
The three-part series The Last Viking provides a fictional biography of King Harald Hardråde.

- The Golden Horn (1980)
- The Road of the Sea Horse (1980)
- The Sign of the Raven (1980)

=== Mysteries ===
- Perish by the Sword (1959)
- Murder in Black Letter (1960)
- Murder Bound (1962)

== Collections ==
- Strangers from Earth (1961)
- Un-Man and Other Novellas (1962)
- Time and Stars (1964)
- The Horn of Time (1968)
- Beyond the Beyond (1969, contains: Memory [originally A World Called Maanerek], 1957; Brake, 1957; Day of the Burning [originally Supernova], 1967; The Sensitive Man, 1954; The Moonrakers, 1966; Starfog, 1967)
- Seven Conquests (1969) (also known as Conquests)
- Tales of the Flying Mountains (1970)
- The Queen of Air and Darkness and Other Stories (1973)
- The Many Worlds of Poul Anderson (also known as The Book of Poul Anderson) (1974) — Edited by Roger Elwood
- Homeward and Beyond (1975)
- The Best of Poul Anderson (1976)
- Homebrew (1976)
- The Night Face & Other Stories (1979)
- Winners (1981) (a collection of Anderson's Hugo-winners)
- Fantasy (1981)
- Explorations (1981)
- The Dark Between the Stars (1981)
- The Gods Laughed (1982)
- The Winter of the World / The Queen of Air and Darkness (1982)
- Conflict (1983) (including, among other stories, the 1966 "High Treason")
- The Unicorn Trade (1984) with Karen Anderson
- Past Times (1984)
- Dialogue With Darkness (1985)
- Space Folk (1989)
- Alight in the Void (1991)
- Kinship with the Stars (1991)
- The Armies of Elfland (1991)
- All One Universe (1996) (including, among other stories, the 1989 text "Uncleftish Beholding")
- Going for Infinity (2002)
- To Outlive Eternity and Other Stories (2007)
- Call Me Joe (2009)
- The Queen of Air and Darkness (2009)
- The Saturn Game (2010)
- Admiralty (2011)
- Door to Anywhere (2013)
- Swordsmen from the Stars (2020)

== Anthologies ==
- Nebula Award Stories Four (1969)
- The Day the Sun Stood Still (1972) with Gordon R. Dickson and Robert Silverberg
- A World Named Cleopatra (1977)

== Nonfiction ==
- Is There Life on Other Worlds? (1963)
- The Infinite Voyage (1969)

== Selected short stories ==
- "Brake"
- "Call Me Joe"
- "Delenda Est"
- "The Entity"
- "Eutopia"
- "Goat Song"—Hugo Award for Best Novelette, 1973
- "The Light"
- "The Longest Voyage"—Hugo Award for Best Short Story, 1961
- "The Man Who Came Early"
- "Marius"
- "Memory"
- "Night Piece"
- "No Truce with Kings"—Hugo Award winner, Best Short Story, 1964
- "The Pirate"
- "The Queen of Air and Darkness"—Hugo Award for Best Novella, 1972
- "The Saturn Game"—Hugo Award winner, Best Novella 1982
- "The Sensitive Man"
- "The Sharing of Flesh"—Hugo Award winner, Best Novelette, 1969
- "Un-Man"
