= Multiverse: Exploring Poul Anderson's Worlds =

2014 anthology edited by Greg Bear and Gardner Dozois

- Cover of Multiverse: Exploring Poul Anderson's Worlds
- Author: edited by Greg Bear and Gardner Dozois
- Illustrator: Bob Eggleton
- Cover artist: Bob Eggleton
- Language: English
- Subject: Science fiction, Fantasy short stories
- Publisher: Subterranean Press
- Publication date: 2014
- Publication place: United States
- Media type: Print (hardcover)
- Pages: 393 pp
- ISBN: 978-1-59606-502-4

Multiverse: Exploring Poul Anderson's Worlds is a gedenkschrift honoring science fiction and fantasy author Poul Anderson, in the form of an anthology of short stories and tributes edited by Greg Bear and Gardner Dozois. The book also includes cover art and interior illustrations by Bob Eggleton. It was first published in hardcover in May 2014 by Subterranean Press, with simultaneous paperback and ebook editions issued in June 2015 by Baen Books. All but one of the pieces are original to the anthology; the remaining one, Tad Williams's "Three Lilies and Three Leopards (And a Participation Ribbon in Science)", was originally published in the Winter 2012 issue of the ejournal Subterreanean Online.

== Summary ==
Most of the works in the book are short stories, novelettes and novellas set in worlds or other settings created by Anderson, some being sequels to stories by him. Nonfiction reminiscences on Anderson by his wife Karen Anderson and daughter Astrid Anderson Bear and friend and fellow writer Jerry Pournelle are also included. An overall introduction by Bear, individual introductions to each story by both editors, and afterwords to each story by the individual authors provide factual information regarding Anderson, the stories, and the impact he had on the authors' lives and work.

== Contents ==
- "Introduction: My Friend Poul" by Greg Bear
- "Outmoded Things" (the planet Roland, from "The Queen of Air and Darkness") by Nancy Kress
- "The Man Who Came Late" (the alternate Earth of Three Hearts and Three Lions) by Harry Turtledove
- "A Slip in Time" (the alternate timelines of the Time Patrol) by S. M. Stirling
- "Living and Working with Poul Anderson" by Karen Anderson
- "Dancing on the Edge of the Dark" (the Terran Empire of Dominic Flandry) by C. J. Cherryh
- "The Lingering Joy" (a sequel to "The Long Remembering") by Stephen Baxter
- "Operation Xibalba" (the alternate Earth of Operation Chaos)) by Eric Flint
- "Tales Told" by Astrid Anderson Bear
- "The Fey of Cloudmoor" (the planet Roland, from "The Queen of Air and Darkness") by Terry Brooks
- "Christmas in Gondwanaland" (the alternate timelines of the Time Patrol) by Robert Silverberg
- "Latecomers" (a story in Brin's own "Existence" series) by David Brin
- "An Appreciation of Poul Anderson" by Jerry Pournelle
- "A Candle" (the Terran Empire of Dominic Flandry) by Raymond E. Feist
- "The Far End" (the alternate timelines of the Time Patrol) by Larry Niven
- "Bloodpride" (the alien Ythri culture from the Polesotechnic League of Nicholas van Rijn) by Gregory Benford
- "Three Lilies and Three Leopards (And a Participation Ribbon in Science)" (the alternate Earth of Three Hearts and Three Lions) by Tad Williams
