= Winners (short story collection) =

1981 collection of short fiction by Poul Anderson

- first edition of Winners
- Author: Poul Anderson
- Cover artist: Michael Whelan
- Language: English
- Genre: Science fiction
- Publisher: Tor Books
- Publication date: 1981
- Publication place: United States
- Media type: Print (paperback)
- Pages: 299
- ISBN: 0-523-48507-7

Winners is a collection of science fiction award-winning short fiction by American writer Poul Anderson, first published in paperback by Tor Books in August 1981. The pieces were originally published between 1960 and 1972 in the magazines The Magazine of Fantasy and Science Fiction, Analog, and Galaxy Magazine.

The book contains five novellas and novelettes by the author, all of which won literary awards.

== Contents ==
- "No Truce With Kings" (winner, 1964 Hugo Award for Best Short Fiction, 2010 Prometheus Hall of Fame Award)
- "The Longest Voyage" (winner, 1961 Hugo Award for Best Short Fiction)
- "The Sharing of Flesh" (winner, 1969 Hugo Award for Best Novelette)
- "The Queen of Air and Darkness" (winner, 1972 Hugo Award for Best Novella, Nebula Award for Best Novelette, Locus Award for Best Short Fiction)
- "Goat Song" (winner, 1973 Hugo Award for Best Novelette, Nebula Award for Best Novelette)
