= New America =

New America or The New America may refer to:

== Literature ==
- New America (short story collection), a 1982 book by Poul Anderson
- The New America: The New World, a 1935 book by H. G. Wells
- New America, the name for Ellesmere Island and beyond in Jules Verne's 1864 novel The Adventures of Captain Hatteras

== Music ==
- The New America, an album by Bad Religion, 2000
- "New America", a song by Darker My Love from Alive as You Are, 2010
- "New America", a song by Digby from What's Not Plastic?, 2007
- "New America", a song by Marina from Ancient Dreams in a Modern Land, 2021

== Other uses ==
- New America (newspaper), an official publication of the Socialist Party of America and later Social Democrats, USA 1960–1985
- New America Foundation, a think tank in Washington, D.C.
- New America Media, a multimedia ethnic news agency 1996–2017

== See also ==
- New American (disambiguation)
