= Devil's Game =

Devil's Game may refer to:

- Devil's Game (book), 2006 book by Robert Dreyfuss
- The Devil's Game (novel), 1980 novel by Poul Anderson
- The Devil's Game (film), 2008 South Korean film
