= Nebula Award Stories 7 =

1972 anthology edited by Lloyd Biggle, Jr.

- First edition (UK)
- Author: edited by Lloyd Biggle, Jr.
- Language: English
- Series: Nebula Award Stories
- Genre: Science fiction
- Publisher: Gollancz 1972 (UK); Harper & Row 1973 (US)
- Publication place: United Kingdom
- Media type: Print (hardcover)
- Pages: 320
- ISBN: 0-575-01591-8
- Preceded by: Nebula Award Stories 6
- Followed by: Nebula Award Stories Eight

Nebula Award Stories 7 is an anthology of award-winning science fiction short works edited by Lloyd Biggle, Jr. It was first published in the United Kingdom in hardcover by Gollancz in November 1972. The first American edition was published by Harper & Row in January 1973; a Science Fiction Book Club edition, also in hardcover, followed in March of the same year. Paperback editions followed from Harrow Books in the U.S. in 1973, and Panther in the U.K. in December 1974. The American editions bore the variant title Nebula Award Stories Seven. The book has also been published in German.

== Summary ==
The book collects pieces published in 1971 that won or were nominated for the Nebula Awards for novella, novelette and short story for the year 1972 and nonfiction pieces related to the awards, together with an introduction by the editor. One of the non-winning pieces nominated for Best Novelette was omitted, and two stories not nominated for any of the awards were included.

== Contents ==
- "Introduction" (Lloyd Biggle, Jr.)
- "1971: The Year in Science Fiction" (Damon Knight)
- "The Queen of Air and Darkness" [Best Novelette winner, 1972] (Poul Anderson)
- "The Last Ghost" [Best Short Story nominee, 1972] (Stephen Goldin)
- "The Encounter" [Best Novelette nominee, 1972] (Kate Wilhelm)
- "Sky" (R. A. Lafferty)
- "Mount Charity" [Best Novelette nominee, 1972] (Edgar Pangborn)
- "Good News from the Vatican" [Best Short Story winner, 1972] (Robert Silverberg)
- "Horse of Air" [Best Short Story nominee, 1972] (Gardner R. Dozois)
- "Heathen God" [Best Short Story nominee, 1972] (George Zebrowski)
- "Poor Man, Beggar Man" [Best Novelette nominee, 1972] (Joanna Russ)
- "The Giberel" (Doris Pitkin Buck)
- "The Missing Man" [Best Novella winner, 1972] (Katherine MacLean)
- "Nebula Award Science Fiction, 1965-1970, The Science" (Poul Anderson)
- "Nebula Award Science Fiction, 1965-1970, The Fiction" (Theodore Sturgeon)
- "In Memoriam" (Lloyd Biggle, Jr.)
- "Award-Winning Science Fiction, 1965-1971"

== Reception ==
P. Schuyler Miller in Analog Science Fiction/Science Fact, called the book "one of the best" of the SFWA annual anthologies, "not only for good stories (which have been surpassed before), but for the 'bonus' chapters," the essays by Knight, Anderson and Sturgeon, which "make the book outstanding." He highlights the Anderson and MacLean stories as "a pair of blockbusters," as well as calling attention to Silverberg's contribution. He notes that "[m]ore of the others stories are fantasies and [genre] borderliners than is usual with these anthologies," describing their content in brief before turning to the Pangborn, Dozois and Buck pieces, with which he seems more taken.
