= Problem of pain =

Problem of pain can mean:

- the problem of evil, the central concern of theodicy
- The Problem of Pain, a book about that topic by C. S. Lewis
- The Problem of Pain, a science fiction novella by Poul Anderson from 1973
