= Scifaiku =

Science fiction haiku, a literary genre

SciFaiku ("science fiction haiku") is a form of science fiction poetry first announced by Tom Brinck with his treatise on the subject, The SciFaiku Manifesto (July 1995). Brinck has been referred to as the "Father of SciFaiku." SciFaiku is inspired by Japanese haiku, but explores science, science fiction (SF), and other speculative fiction themes, such as fantasy and horror. They are based on the principles and form of haiku but can deviate from its structure.

Scifaiku follow three major principles – minimalism, immediacy and human insight:

- Scifaiku follows the haiku model, including its spirit of minimalism. While traditional Japanese haiku usually has 3 phrases of 5, 7, and 5 on ("sound symbols"), haiku in English usually has seventeen (or fewer) syllables. Scifaiku is even more flexible and may be shorter or longer (allowing for longer technical terms, e.g. anisomorphism), although most often still written, as English language haiku, in three lines.
- Immediacy is the use of direct sensory perceptions to give a sense of being in the moment. Concrete, rather than abstract terms are used. Metaphor and allegory are rarely explicit though sometimes implied.
- Human insight comes from the idea that the purpose of much science fiction is to understand ourselves better through exploring possible futures or speculative realities.

== Science fiction haiku ==
Before there was scifaiku on the Internet, there was science fiction haiku. Probably the earliest publication of science fiction haiku was Karen Anderson's "Six Haiku" (The Magazine of Fantasy and Science Fiction, July 1962). Below is number four of her six SF haiku.

Those crisp cucumbers
Not yet planted in Syrtis --
How I desire one!

Terry Pratchett included the following SF haiku as a chapter epigram in his early non-Discworld novel, The Dark Side of the Sun (1976).

Hark to the crash of
the leaves in the autumn, the smash
of the crystal leaves.

Charles Sub-Lunar, 'Planetary Haiku'

It wasn't until 1979 that science fiction haiku were regularly published, with Robert Frazier's "Haiku for the L5" (Isaac Asimov's Science Fiction Magazine, 1979) and "Haiku for the Space Shuttle" (IASFM, 1980) starting the trend. In 1994, Michael Bishop's story "Cri di Coeur" (IASFM 1994) featured a haiku contest held on an interstellar ship, with the topic of haiku about astrophysics, subject to the constraint that (as in Japanese haiku) the poems must each feature a season. (The ten haiku featured in the story were written by Bishop and Geoffrey A. Landis).

The most extensive use of haiku in science fiction is in David Brin's Uplift Universe (especially in the novel Startide Rising), where the uplifted dolphins speak a haiku-like language called Trinary. He has characters quoting haiku by Kobayashi Issa and Yosa Buson, and has them spontaneously writing their own haiku. Outside of his Uplift Universe, Brin has haiku as chapter epigrams in his novel The Postman.

One of the main characters in Neal Stephenson's Cryptonomicon, Bobby Shaftoe, is a haiku-writing U.S. Marine Raider during World War II. The book's prologue starts with one of his very rough haiku :

Two tires fly. Two wail.
A bamboo grove, all chopped down
From it, warring songs

Zoe's boyfriend, in John Scalzi's 2008 novel Zoe's Tale, sends a haiku to her PDA.

Two of the more famous science fiction authors who have also written science fiction haiku are Joe Haldeman and Thomas M. Disch. The author Paul O. Williams, who has written a series of science fiction books as well as books of regular haiku and senryū, has combined both interests with some published science fiction haiku.

== Scifaiku mailing lists ==
There have been three different Internet scifaiku mailing lists in succession. These mailing lists have been the primary base for the writing and sharing of scifaiku on the internet.

The original sciFaiku mailing list was a Univ. of Michigan-based listserv (where Tom Brinck was in graduate school). The first post on the list was on 23 July 1996.

Later on there was a mailing list organized through scifaiku.com (first post 15 February 1998). After problems with that mailing list server, the scifaiku list moved to Yahoo! Groups on 17 March 2001. As of 22 July 2006 there have been over 13,000 posts just on the scifaiku mailing list at Yahoo! Groups. From the home page:

This group is for the writing and sharing of science fiction haiku (aka scifaiku). We also occasionally write similar genres, such as fantasy haiku and horror haiku. The members also write SF poems using other short poetry forms, such as waka, senryū, sijo, kanshi, etc.

Group members have also created a few of their own poetry forms, such as the contrail and the Fibonacci-No-Haiku (based upon the Fibonacci number), written SF poetry based on other short poetry forms such as the cinquain, and experimented with a number of collaborative poetry forms such as science fiction renga and stellarenga.

== Scifaiku and science fiction haiku publications ==
- Slippage, a bi-annual, online literary magazine bridging the worlds of art and science
- Haiku by Unohu by Keith Allen Daniels, Anamnesis Press, April 2000, ISBN 1-892842-09-2 (because most of the poems are humorous, they could be best be described as science fiction senryū)
- Scifaikuest, a quarterly online and print short-form SFF poetry journal from Alban Lake Publishing (formerly Sam's Dot Publishing) ISSN 1558-9757
- Stellar Possibilities by John J. Dunphy, Sam's Dot Publishing, 2006 (a collection of scifaiku and haibun)
- Red Planet Dust by Deborah P. Kolodji, Gromagon Press, 2006 (a chapbook of scifaiku)
- A Nameless Place by Joanne Morcom, Sam's Dot Publishing, 2006 (a chapbook of scifaiku, tanka and haibun)
- Random Planets edited by Teri Santitoro and L.A. Story Houry, Sam's Dot Publishing (an anthology of scifaiku)
- Dwarf Stars: 30 Stellar Short-Short Science Fiction, Fantasy and Horror Poems from 2004, edited by Deborah P. Kolodji, 2005 (an anthology of scifaiku and other very short speculative fiction poems; the first in an annual series published by the Science Fiction Poetry Association)
- Instantaneous (In)sanity by Jess C Scott, jessINK Publishing, 2012 (a poetry anthology that features scifaiku)
- The Starlight SciFaiku Review (ISSN 2770-9116). A quarterly literary journal of SciFaiku and science fiction minimalist line art in b&w. Published online, in digital, and in print. Justin T. O'Conor Sloane, editor, Starship Sloane Publishing Company, Inc.

== Awards ==
The Science Fiction Poetry Association gives out the Dwarf Stars Award for the best short-short speculative poem each year, including scifaiku and related short-short science-fictional poetry (defined as under ten lines in length). The nominees for the award are published in an annual anthology, Dwarf Stars.
