= The Star Fox =

1965 science fiction novel by Poul Anderson

- First edition
- Author: Poul Anderson
- Cover artist: Johannes Regn
- Language: English
- Genre: Science fiction
- Publisher: Doubleday
- Publication date: 1965
- Publication place: United States
- Media type: Print (hardback & paperback)
- Pages: 274
- OCLC: 1801279

The Star Fox is a science fiction novel by Poul Anderson, first published in 1965. It was nominated for the Nebula Award for Best Novel in 1965.

== Fixup status ==
The novel is a fixup of the stories "Marque and Reprisal", "Arsenal Port" and "Admiralty", originally published in The Magazine of Fantasy & Science Fiction from February to June 1965.

== Plot summary ==
The Star Fox is set during a period of conflict between humanity and an alien race named the Aleriona; specifically, the conflict between the wily Gunnar Heim and his Alerionian adversary, Cynbe ru Taren, the Aleriona "Intellect Master of the Garden of War" who has been trained in the ways of human thought to the extent that he is alienated from his own race. Heim begins as a privateer in his illegally outfitted ship the Fox II (named after his old military ship, the Star Fox), waging a one-man war on the Aleriona who ultimately forces Earth into conflict, as he realises that the Alerionan desire to rule all other species is almost impossible to defeat. Throughout the novel, Heim and Cynbe develop a grudging respect for each other's skills, culminating in a tragic final conflict.

== Themes ==
It is typical of Anderson's work that both Gunnar Heim and Cynbe are depicted sympathetically and honourably, in a manner not dissimilar to the depiction of Dominic Flandry and his Chereionite adversary Aycharaych in his "Terran Empire" stories. Anderson also makes a scathing comment on the anti-Vietnam War movement in his introduction of a pacifist group named "World Militants for Peace". Freedom, as Anderson sees it, may come from the expansion of humanity into space, particularly with regard to the planet of New Europe. Unlike Anderson's Mirkheim, which is inhabited by intelligent life, or the barely tolerable Rustum from Orbit Unlimited, New Europe is Earth-like and filled with native life-forms, albeit non-sentient.

The Libertarian Futurist Society says the novel espouses libertarian themes and the book was inducted into the Prometheus Award Hall of Fame by the Society in 1995. In the same year, Anderson won the main Prometheus award for his novel The Stars Are Also Fire.

== Continuity ==
Gunnar Heim also appears in Anderson's 1974 novel Fire Time.
