= Three Hearts and Three Lions =

1961 fantasy novel by Poul Anderson

- Cover of the first edition
- Author: Poul Anderson
- Cover artist: Edward Gorey
- Language: English
- Genre: Fantasy
- Publisher: Doubleday
- Publication date: June 16, 1961
- Publication place: United States
- Media type: Print (hardback)
- Pages: 191

Three Hearts and Three Lions is a 1961 fantasy novel by American writer Poul Anderson, expanded from a 1953 novella by Anderson which appeared in Fantasy & Science Fiction magazine.

== Plot ==
Holger Carlsen is an American-trained Danish engineer who joins the Danish resistance to the Nazis in World War II. At the shore near Elsinore, he is among the group of resistance fighters trying to cover the escape to Sweden of an important scientist (evidently the nuclear physicist Niels Bohr). With a German force closing in, Carlsen is shot and suddenly finds himself transported to a parallel universe, a world in which Northern European legend is real. This world is divided between the forces of Chaos, inhabiting the "Middle World" (which includes Faerie), and the forces of Law based in the human world, which is in turn divided between the Holy Roman Empire and the Saracens. He finds the equipment and horse of a medieval knight waiting for him. The shield is emblazoned with three hearts and three lions. He finds that the clothes and armor fit him perfectly, and he knows how to use the weapons and ride the horse as well as speak fluently the local language, a very archaic form of French.

Seeking to return to his own world, Holger is joined by Alianora, a swan maiden, and Hugi, a dwarf. They are induced to follow the seemingly attractive elvish Duke Alfric of Faerie, who in fact plots to imprison Holger in Elf Hill, where time runs differently. Holger learns that Morgan Le Fay, his lover in a forgotten past life, is his ultimate adversary.

They escape and, after encountering a dragon, a giant, and a werewolf, reach the town of Tarnberg, where they are joined by the mysterious Saracen, Carahue, who has been searching for Holger. Based on the advice of the wizard, Martinus Trismegistus, they set out to recover the sword Cortana. The sword is in a ruined church, guarded by a nixie, cannibal hillmen, and (most dangerous of all) a troll.

On the perilous quest, Holger and Alianora fall deeply in love with each other. However, Holger avoids physically consummating this love though Alianora wants him to as he intends to return to his 20th-century world. But with the perilous Wild Hunt on their tracks, Holger and Alianora pledge their love and he promises, if surviving the ordeal ahead, always to remain with her. However, the decision is taken out of his hands.

Once the sword is recovered, Holger discovers that he is the legendary Ogier the Dane, a champion of Law. He vanquishes the forces of Chaos and is transported back to his own world, right back to the battle in Elsinore and, with a burst of superhuman strength, vanquishes the Nazi troops and enables Bohr to escape and play his part in the Manhattan Project. Thus, in two worlds, Holger/Ogier has fulfilled his destiny of fighting evil forces and preserving Denmark and France. The magical forces involved have no consideration for the hero's love life, leaving him stranded away from his beloved Alianora. Desperately wanting to return to the other world, he seeks clues in old books of magic. His enduring affinity with the medieval world in which he met her is expressed by a decision to convert to Catholicism.

== Inspiration ==
The Coat of Arms of Denmark currently includes Nine Hearts and Three Lions. Historically, the lions were always three, but the number of hearts often changed until it was fixed at nine in 1819.

The novel is a pastiche of interwoven stories and draws on the corpus of Northern European legends, including Ogier the Dane, the Matter of France, Arthurian romance, Oberon (Duke Alfric in the novel), Germanic mythology, and traditional magic. It uses related literary sources such as Edmund Spenser's The Faerie Queene, William Shakespeare's A Midsummer Night's Dream, Robert Burns's Tam o' Shanter, and Mark Twain's A Connecticut Yankee in King Arthur's Court. It also shows influence of J. R. R. Tolkien's The Hobbit and The Lord of the Rings with references to Mirkwood and wargs. It has some similarity to C. S. Lewis's The Lion, the Witch and the Wardrobe.

The dividing line between the Empire in the West and threatening Faerie to the East seems to mirror the Cold War's dividing line between the West and East blocs that ran running through the real Europe at the time of writing.

The story makes reference to the perceived connection between science and magic during the Medieval and Renaissance periods. The protagonist, Holger Carlsen, is introduced as a mechanical engineer in the preface titled "Note." Occasionally, he makes use of his knowledge of science as a way to make sense of the magical world in which he finds himself and as a way to solve problems. For example, the Rubber Handbook, "The Burning Dagger" (made of magnesium), Bertrand Russell's Theory of Types, the experiments of Rutherford and Lawrence experiments with radioactivity, among others.

== Other works ==
Holger later appears as a minor character in Anderson's A Midsummer Tempest, in which he is seen in a mysterious "Inn Between the Worlds" after he managed at last to leave the 20th century and to wander the various alternate timelines by using the spells from a medieval grimoire. However, he had little control over where he would get and a small chance of locating the one that he wants. At the inn, he encounters Valeria Matuchek, a character from another Anderson book, Operation Chaos, who instructs him in the sophisticated scientific magic of her world and gives him a better chance.

In addition, Holger appears (with many other classic science fiction characters although Holger is a classic fantasy character) in the tournament at the end of Heinlein's The Number of the Beast.

A scene in Jack L. Chalker's And the Devil Will Drag You Under occurs in a tavern where several characters from classic fantasy hang out. One of these is addressed as "Holger" after he objects to another fellow, who appears to be Conan the Barbarian, singing a ditty about "three hearts and three lions."

In 2014, Harry Turtledove wrote, as his contribution to Multiverse: Exploring Poul Anderson's Worlds, edited by Greg Bear and Gardner Dozois, a short story, "The Man who Came Late". It takes place thirty years after the events of Three Hearts and Three Lions, which is how long it has taken Holger Carlsen to get back to Alianora. Magic first took him from Nazi-occupied Denmark in 1943, when he was a member of the Resistance. After the war, it took him five years to find a medieval spell that would take him across the timelines. Then, he spent a lot of time in blundering blindly from one timeline to another. After getting better instructions from Valeria Matuchek, he still had to overcome the magical opposition of the Chaos forces, which did not want him back in their world. After he finally reached the right world, he still had to travel on foot across Europe and sought for her in town after town and village after village.

When at last they come face to face, it is too late. When he had not come back from his battle and had clearly disappeared from the face of the Earth, Alianora was deeply heartbroken but eventually accepted the proposal of a village smith, a good and solid man even if he is not very exciting, settled into the life of a rather prosperous village housewife and gave birth to two sons and a daughter, the last of whom she passed on the May Swan magic tunic. Thus, Holger became "The Man who Came Late" (the title is derived from an unrelated Anderson story, "The Man Who Came Early"). Though still having a strong feeling for him, Alianora has no intention of abandoning her family and the life that she had built. At the end of the story Morgan la Fay reappears and seems poised to catch Holger on the rebound.

Michael Moorcock cited Three Hearts and Three Lions as one of the works that greatly influenced his own fantasy, which is similarly set in a universe in which the forces of Law and Chaos are pitted in an eternal war with each other. Specifically, Anderson's theme of a man snatched suddenly from our world to a fantasy world in which he is regarded as a great hero of that world's past and expected to perform new heroic acts, but he has only the vaguest memories of that past life, is shared with the 1970 Moorcock novel The Eternal Champion, which is otherwise very different.

The plot is humorously described in "Poul Anderson's 'Three Hearts and Three Lions': A Calypso in Search of a Rhyme", by Randall Garrett and Vicki Ann Heydron

== Reception ==
Floyd C. Gale in 1962 rated the novel version of Three Hearts and Three Lions four stars out of five.

The novel influenced the role-playing game Dungeons & Dragons, especially the original alignment system, which grouped all characters and creatures into "Law" and "Chaos". The game drew from the novel's depiction of the troll, whose body "regenerates", healing itself extremely quickly when wounded. Other creatures from the game that were influenced by the novel include the swanmay and the nixie. The novel also inspired the paladin character class.

== Awards ==
The 1953 novella is a Retro-Hugo nominee.

== Sources ==
- Tymn, Marshall B.; Kenneth J. Zahorski; Robert H. Boyer (1979). Fantasy Literature: A Core Collection and Reference Guide. New York: R.R. Bowker Co. p. 45. ISBN 0-8352-1431-1.
