= Nebula Award Stories 4 =

1969 anthology edited by Poul Anderson

- First edition (UK)
- Author: edited by Poul Anderson
- Language: English
- Series: Nebula Award Stories
- Genre: Science fiction
- Publisher: Gollancz (UK); Doubleday (US)
- Publication date: 1969
- Publication place: United Kingdom
- Media type: Print (hardcover)
- Pages: 287
- Preceded by: Nebula Award Stories 3
- Followed by: Nebula Award Stories 5

Nebula Award Stories 4 is an anthology of award-winning science fiction short works edited by Poul Anderson. It was first published in the United Kingdom in hardcover by Gollancz in November 1969. The first American edition was published by Doubleday in December of the same year. Paperback editions followed from Pocket Books in the U.S. in January 1971, and Panther in the U.K. in December 1971. The American editions bore the variant title Nebula Award Stories Four.

== Summary ==
The book collects pieces published in 1968 that won or were nominated for the Nebula Awards for novella, novelette and short story for the year 1969 and a few nonfiction pieces, including several memorial notices on deceased notables in the science fiction field, together with an introduction by the editor. Not all non-winning pieces nominated for the awards were included.

== Contents ==
- "Introduction" (Poul Anderson)
- "Foreword: The Science Fiction Novel in 1968" [essay] (Willis E. McNelly)
- "Mother to the World" [Best Novelette, winner] (Richard Wilson)
- "The Dance of the Changer and the Three" [Best Short Story, nominee] (Terry Carr)
- "The Planners" [Best Short Story, winner] (Kate Wilhelm)
- "Sword Game" [Best Short Story, nominee] (H. H. Hollis)
- "The Listeners" [Best Novelette, nominee] (James E. Gunn)
- "Dragonrider" [Best Novella, winner] (Anne McCaffrey)
- "In Memoriam - Anthony Boucher" (J. Francis McComas)
- "In Memoriam - Rosel George Brown" (Daniel F. Galouye)
- "In Memoriam - Bernard I. Kahn" (John W. Campbell)
- "In Memoriam - Groff Conklin" (Isaac Asimov)
- "In Memoriam - Anna Kavan" (Brian W. Aldiss)
- "In Memoriam - Gerald Kersh" (Harlan Ellison)
- "In Memoriam - Frank Owen" (Emil Petaja)
- "In Memoriam - Edison Marshall" (Alva Rogers)
- "In Memoriam - Mervyn Peake" (Michael Moorcock)
- "In Memoriam - Stuart Palmer" (Karen Anderson)
- "In Memoriam - Arthur Sellings" (Ted Carnell)
- "In Memoriam - A. A. Wyn" (by Donald Wollheim)
- "In Memoriam - Harl Vincent" (Forrest J. Ackerman)

== Reception ==
P. Schuyler Miller in Analog Science Fiction/Science Fact praised the McCaffrey piece as "a well-deserved best novella choice," and the novel in which it was afterwards incorporated (Dragonflight) as "probably the best Analog novel since 'Dune.'" He called Carr's piece "strange" and "practically indescribable—an attempt to see an utterly alien life form in its own terms" that "few have succeeded [at] as well as ... Carr." Of the other pieces, he characterized Wilson's as "a moving 'last man' story," Wilhelm's as an instance "of the stories about molecular biology that John Campbell asked for at the Washington SF Convention in 1963," Hollis's as "the kind of comedy of mathematics that 'Lewis Padgett' and Sprague de Camp used to write," and Gunn's as a demonstration that "old school masters can handle the 'New Wave' techniques forcefully." He assessed it "higher than Wilson's winner, if that was the class in which it was rated."

The anthology was also reviewed by Barry Malzberg in The Magazine of Fantasy and Science Fiction v. 38, no. 5, May 1970, John Foyster in SF Commentary #12, June 1970, and Ted Pauls in The WSFA Journal #76, April/May 1971.
