= Time and Stars =

1964 collection of short stories by Poul Anderson

- Dust-jacket from the first edition
- Author: Poul Anderson
- Cover artist: Thomas Chibbaro
- Language: English
- Genre: Science fiction
- Published: 1964
- Publisher: Doubleday
- Publication place: United States
- Media type: Print (hardback)
- Pages: 249

Time and Stars is a collection of science fiction short stories by American writer Poul Anderson, published in 1964.

== Contents ==
- "No Truce with Kings": A story about a civil war set on a future, semi-primitive Earth. The protagonists discover that aliens have been introducing advanced technology to one side in order to manipulate the course of human events.
  - Original Appearance: The Magazine of Fantasy and Science Fiction, June 1963
- "The Critique of Impure Reason": A robot will not work because it is infatuated with modern literature and literary criticism. (Not to be confused with the Critique of Impure Reason, a book in philosophy by Steven James Bartlett.)
  - Original Appearance: If, November 1962
- "Escape from Orbit": Astronauts stranded in orbit around the Moon
  - Original Appearance: Amazing Stories, October 1962
- "Eve Times Four" (Available online): Space traveler Lothario is stranded on a planet with three beautiful women
  - Original Appearance: Fantastic Science Fiction Stories, April 1960
- "Turning Point": A first contact story that gives a haunting portrait of the price of giftedness and the loss of innocence
  - Original Appearance: If, May 1963
- "Epilogue": A crew of humans return to Earth after a long absence, finding it has been taken over by a kind of transistor-based ecology of machines; a lack of understanding between the robots and the humans leads to tragedy
  - Original Appearance: Analog, March 1962

== Reception ==
Algis Budrys in the February 1965 issue of Galaxy Science Fiction said that "what Anderson needed in Time and Stars was an editor". He disliked "Eve Times Four" and "No Truce With Kings" but liked the others, calling "Escape From Orbit" "a beautifully done piece of work like nothing I have seen in the field before". In February 1966 Budrys named the book the best collection of his first year as reviewer for the magazine, and "Escape from Orbit" the best short story.
