= New American =

New American may refer to:

- New American cuisine, fusion cuisine originating from the 1980s
- New American Gospel, the second studio album by American groove metal band Lamb of God
- New American High Schools initiative by the United States Department of Education
- New American Independent Party, a political party founded in 2004
- New American Movement, a left-wing political movement founded in 1971

== Publishing ==
- New American Bible
- New American Standard Bible
- New American Library, a book publisher
- The New American Poetry 1945-1960, a classic poetry anthology
- New American Writing, a literary magazine
- The New American, a publication of the John Birch Society
- Chicago's New American, a newspaper published in 1959

== See also ==
- New America (disambiguation)
