= Nebula Award Stories 3 =

1968 anthology edited by Roger Zelazny

- First edition (UK)
- Editor: Roger Zelazny
- Language: English
- Series: Nebula Award Stories
- Genre: Science fiction
- Publisher: Gollancz (UK); Doubleday (US)
- Publication date: 1968
- Publication place: United Kingdom
- Media type: Print (hardcover)
- Pages: 256
- ISBN: 0-575-00163-1
- Preceded by: Nebula Award Stories Two
- Followed by: Nebula Award Stories 4

Nebula Award Stories 3 is an anthology of award-winning science fiction short works edited by American author Roger Zelazny. It was first published in the United Kingdom in hardcover by Gollancz in November 1968. The first American edition was published by Doubleday in December of the same year. Paperback editions followed from Pocket Books in the U.S. in February 1970, and Panther in the UK in November 1970. The American editions carried the variant title Nebula Award Stories Three. The book was more recently reissued by Stealth Press in hardcover in June 2001. It has also been published in German.

== Summary ==
The book collects pieces published in 1967 that won or were nominated for the Nebula Awards for novella, novelette and short story for the year 1968, together with two additional short stories and an introduction and afterword by the editor. Not all non-winning pieces nominated for the awards were included.

== Contents ==
- "Introduction" (Roger Zelazny)
- "The Cloud-Sculptors of Coral D" [short story] (J. G. Ballard)
- "Pretty Maggie Moneyeyes" [Best Novelette, nominee] (Harlan Ellison)
- "Mirror of Ice" [short story] (Gary Wright)
- "Aye, and Gomorrah ..." [Best Short Story, winner] (Samuel R. Delany)
- "Gonna Roll the Bones" [Best Novelette, winner] (Fritz Leiber)
- "Behold the Man" [Best Novella, winner] (Michael Moorcock)
- "Weyr Search" [Best Novella, nominee] (Anne McCaffrey)
- "Afterword" (Roger Zelazny)

== Reception ==
Algis Budrys in Galaxy Magazine takes the editor, who "writes better than most people," to task for an introduction full of "canned-brain cliches," commenting that "[t]his business of making up intros and footnotes and hindnotes last year made Nebula Two's editors ridiculous, and the poetastic aegis is obviously even more powerful than previously suspected, if it could clench this worm of nonsense out of someone with Zelazny's qualities." He is happier with the fictional content: "[t]he stories in his book, thank God, give the lie to the essential sterility of talking about literature," noting that the Delany, Leiber, and Moorcock pieces "did win Nebulas", and the McCaffery, Ballard, Ellison and Wright pieces "were heavily nominated, and clearly had enough stature to win." The last two "might in fact, easily strike you as the best story in the book, either one."

P. Schuyler Miller in Analog Science Fiction/Science Fact also praises the stories, calling the Moorcock and Delany pieces "excellent off-track science fiction", with the former "a strange and powerful time-travel story" and the latter "written with the understanding and good taste that you always get from Delany." He singles out the Wright piece as "an excellent—and rare—future sport story" of "powered one-man sledding as a cruel, soul-destroying 'sport' of the future [that] will convince you that a good mechanic could build one of the sleds tomorrow." The other stories are characterized briefly. Miller notes that the McCaffrey piece, in addition to being a Nebula runner-up, had won the Hugo Award; the Leiber piece is dismissed as fantasy, as are the "other runner-ups", which he feels are "well done but not Analog fodder."

The anthology was also reviewed by Bruce Gillespie in SF Commentary #4, 1969 (reprinted in SF Commentary Reprint Edition: First Year 1969, 1982); it was also reviewed by Gordon Johnson in Vector 52, Winter/Spring 1969.
