= The Fifth Head of Cerberus =

1972 novella by Gene Wolfe

- First edition
- Author: Gene Wolfe
- Cover artist: Nicholas Gaetano
- Language: English
- Genre: Science fiction
- Publisher: Charles Scribner's Sons
- Publication date: 1972
- Publication place: USA
- Media type: Print (hardback and paperback)
- Pages: 244 pp
- ISBN: 0-684-12830-6
- OCLC: 354762
- Dewey Decimal: 813/.5/4
- LC Class: PZ4.W85615 Fi PS3573.O52

The Fifth Head of Cerberus is the title of both a novella and a single-volume collection of three novellas, written by American science fiction and fantasy author Gene Wolfe, both published in 1972. The novella was included in the anthology Nebula Award Stories Eight.

== Title ==
The title is a play on words in reference to Cerberus, a three-headed dog from Greek mythology who guarded the entrance to the underworld, Hades. In the first novella the protagonist explains that Cerberus represents his own family, its three heads being his father, aunt and Mr. Million, adding that its "unseen" heads are his brother David as fourth and, by implication, the fifth and final the narrator's own. Following this logic, the title of the novella therefore refers to the narrator himself, whose story we read. Further parallels between the narrator's family and the mythology of Cerberus can be drawn in numerous other ways throughout this novella. For example, a statue of this mythological creature exists at the front, or "gates" of their family home, which is itself located at 666 Saltimbanque, this number having associations with the underworld dating back to the Greek manuscripts of the Book of Revelation. Also, their family home is later referred to at one point as the Maison du Chien, literally "House of the Dog"; in several other places it is called "Cave Canem", or "Beware of the Dog".

== Single-volume collection ==
The collection is an expansion of the first novella, originally published in the Orbit 10 anthology edited by Damon Knight in 1972. The following novellas, "A Story" by John V. Marsch and V.R.T. expand on the plot and themes of the first.

These works are set on two colony worlds, 20 light-years from Earth, the double planets of Sainte Anne and Sainte Croix, originally settled by French-speaking colonists, but lost by them in a war with an unnamed enemy. Sainte Anne was (perhaps) once home to an indigenous aboriginal culture (at an apparently pre-paleolithic level of technology) of shapeshifters, who may – or may not – have been wiped out by the human incomers.

Wolfe presented the title novella at a Milford Writer's Workshop. Norbert Slepyan, an editor at Scribner's, was impressed by the story and proposed that Wolfe write two more, related novellas, to be published in a single book.

== Novellas ==
=== The Fifth Head of Cerberus ===
The title story is in the form of a biographical study, the narrator of which looks back on his boyhood and youth on the planet of Sainte Croix, and the events which led to his long, harsh incarceration, and eventual freedom.

Brought up in relative comfort in a large house (a brothel run by his father and aunt, staffed by several genetically enhanced "demimondaines"), he and his younger brother David are privately tutored by a robotic servant and often go outside the house for short trips.

One evening his old life ends when he is called to attend to his father, a distant figure. He is told that his name is now "Number 5", and after a period of questioning he is given a barrage of psychological, visual, drug, and association tests, which endure for some time. Finally released, he feels very drained. He finds out that David has been treated similarly; both boys undergo this treatment regularly for years afterward, though Number 5 is treated more severely, and begins to experience painful headaches and memory lapses.

He meets his aunt for the first time, who seems to know about Veil's Hypothesis (the theory that the Sainte Anne aboriginals could mimic the human settlers so perfectly that they killed them and took their places) and is given light duties in the running of the family business. He also meets John Marsch, an anthropologist from Earth, when he visits the house. He is visiting Aubrey Veil, author of the hypothesis, who happens to be Number 5's aunt.

Befriending a girl, she, he, and David get involved in amateur dramatics; money being short, they decide to break into a slave trader's warehouse to steal some cash. There, they meet a surgically altered human slave who bears an uncanny resemblance to him, and his father. After it attacks them, they kill it and run away.

Finally sick of his father's ongoing experiments on him, Number 5 decides to kill him. His resolve is bolstered after another visit by Marsch, who casually informs him that he, Number 5, and his father are clones – only two of many. This conversation is ended when Number 5 identifies Marsch as being an aboriginal, based on evidence never specified explicitly in the book. He kills his father, but is discovered and incarcerated. After nine years of imprisonment, Number 5 takes his father's place as head of the family estate.

=== "A Story," by John V. Marsch ===
In this hallucinatory tale from pre-contact Sainte Anne, Sandwalker sets out on a dreamquest to find "the priest", in his lonely cave, to commune with him. Sleeping at the entrance to the cave, he and his twin, Eastwind, unaware of each other's existence, dream of each other. Waking, Sandwalker goes out to hunt, where he meets the Shadow Children, an ethereal, nocturnal race, and they make an alliance by sharing food and learning each other's songs.

Walking on, he meets a girl and a baby, whom he befriends. After sleeping with her, and hunting for more food, he decides to follow the river downstream to the marshes. He manages to rescue some Shadow children from enemy marshmen, whom he kills. Learning that his mother and friends have been captured by other marshmen and taken away, he decides to follow and rescue them as well.

Followed by the Shadow children, they are all, themselves, captured and thrown into a large pit, where he finds his mother and friends; they are all due to be sacrificed by the marshmen, so their souls will enter the river and carry messages from them to the stars. His twin, Eastwind, belongs to the tribe who captured him.

The Shadow Children, whose thoughts, for many years, have spread out into space and protected the world from discovery by alien races (such as they were, originally) decide to relinquish this protection, which attracts a passing starcrosser, and in the excitement of its landing nearby, they escape, and nothing is the same ever again.

=== V.R.T. ===
John Marsch, the anthropologist from the first story, has been imprisoned in a Sainte Croix jail, ostensibly for espionage and assassination. After a few years of captivity, all of it in solitary confinement, Marsch's case is being reviewed by an unnamed security official who must go over the files and determine the next stage in his punishment. These files consist of Marsch's logs from his previous anthropological visit to Sainte Anne, interspersed with taped recordings of his interrogation sessions. The interrogator believes it is obvious that Marsch has never been to Earth, although Marsch is not shown as betraying his origins in the text.

On Sainte Anne to study the mystery of the original inhabitants, Marsch hires a local boy (VRT) from his father, who claims the boy is half-aboriginal. Both the father and the son claim that aboriginals can still be encountered in the deep countryside, so a mission is undertaken to explore.

The two set out into the wilderness. Much time is spent looking for them, but Marsch, despite coming into contact with many examples of Annese wildlife and learning much from the boy (and he from him), never seems to find what he is looking for. Over time, they develop a camp follower, a cat. Marsch suspects at around the same time that the cat joins their company that the boy has been having visitations by a woman.

Later, an accident occurs in which the boy dies. After that, Marsch continues exploring on his own, but he has changed in ways that the alert reader will find suspicious.

On his return to civilization, he visits the brothel run by Number 5's father to interview Dr. Veil. Soon after, he is arrested, tried, and imprisoned for the crimes mentioned, above.

In his memories and dreams, it is revealed that Marsch may in fact be the boy, their identity overlapping. The vital inference of this story is that Veil's hypothesis is indeed correct, the boy assuming Marsch's identity, a wound suffered from the cat being a convenient explanation for the marked decline in hand-writing quality, the native Annese being renowned for their inability to use tools.

== Characters ==
- Number Five: Narrator. It is implied that his last name is "Wolfe", from his mention of searching for his father's writings in the library, and looking among books by Vernor Vinge, Kate Wilhelm, and Virginia Woolf; Kim Stanley Robinson has written of having deduced that "gene" is the ideal "first name for a clone", and of having had this confirmed by Wolfe.
- David: Number 5's half-brother. Actually natural son ("an outcrossing") of Maitre.
- Mr. Million: A "ten nine (1000000000) unbound simulator"; a robotic body containing the scanned, uploaded brain of a human (Number Five's "great-grandfather", actually the clone-originator). Tutor to him and David.
- Maitre: Number 5's "father".
- Madame/Aunt Jeannine/Dr. Aubrey Veil: Number 5's "aunt"; actually natural daughter of an earlier clone.
- Dr. John V. Marsch: Anthropologist, originally from Earth.
- John Sandwalker: Aboriginal on walkabout in a pre-contact Sainte Anne.
- John Eastwind: Twin of the above; separated at birth and brought up by a rival tribe.
- Trenchard: Human Sainte Annese drunkard, father of VRT.
- V.R.T.: Son of Trenchard; half-aboriginal.
- The Officer: Sainte Croix security-forces bureaucrat. (Robert Borski identifies the Officer as Number Five's brother David.)

== Literary significance and criticism ==
Gardner Dozois has said that the original story was the best novella of the 1970s.

Dave Pringle reviewed The Fifth Head of Cerberus for Imagine magazine, and stated that "A collection of three inter-related novelettes set in an alien solar system, it makes a deeply imaginative and moving book."

== Awards and nominations ==
- Story: nominated for the 1972 Nebula Award for best novella
- Story: nominated for the 1973 Hugo Award for best novella
- Story: nominated (3rd) for the 1973 Locus Award for best novella
- Story: nominated for the 1999 Locus All-Time Poll for best novella
- Novel: nominated (11th) for the 1973 Locus Award for best novel

== Release details ==
- Dec 1972, HB, ISBN 0-684-12830-6, USA edition, Charles Scribner's Sons
- Mar 1973, HB, ISBN 0-575-01597-7, UK edition, Gollancz
- June 1975, PB, ISBN 0-7043-1176-3, UK edition, Quartet Books
- Janu 1983, PB, ISBN 0-09-930030-3, UK edition, Arrow Books
- Mar 1994, PB, ISBN 0-312-89020-6, USA edition, Orb Books
- Apr 1999, PB, ISBN 1-85798-817-5, UK edition, Gollancz
