= Nebula Award Stories Eight =

1973 anthology edited by Isaac Asimov

- First edition (US)
- Editor: Isaac Asimov
- Cover artist: Luba Litwak
- Language: English
- Series: Nebula Award Stories
- Genre: Science fiction
- Publisher: Harper & Row (US); Gollancz (UK)
- Publication date: 1973
- Publication place: United States
- Media type: Print (hardcover)
- Pages: xx, 248
- ISBN: 0-06-010151-2
- Preceded by: Nebula Award Stories 7
- Followed by: Nebula Award Stories 9

Nebula Award Stories Eight is an anthology of science fiction short works edited by American writer Isaac Asimov. It was first published in hardcover in November 1973, in the United States by Harper & Row and in the United Kingdom by Gollancz. The British edition bore the variant title Nebula Award Stories 8. Paperback editions followed from Berkley Medallion in the U.S. in September 1975, and Panther in the U.K. in the same year; both paperback editions adopted the British version of the title. The book has also been published in German.

== Summary ==
The book collects pieces that won or were nominated for the Nebula Awards for novella, novelette and short story for the year 1973 and nonfiction pieces related to the Nebula and Hugo Awards, together with an introduction by the editor. All three of the winning stories were included, but only a selection of the non-winning pieces nominated for the awards.

== Contents ==
- "Introduction: So Why Aren't We Rich?" (Isaac Asimov)
- "A Meeting with Medusa" [Best Novella winner, 1973] (Arthur C. Clarke)
- "Shaffery Among the Immortals" [Best Short Story nominee, 1973] (Frederik Pohl)
- "Patron of the Arts" [Best Novelette nominee, 1973] (William Rotsler)
- "When It Changed" [Best Short Story winner, 1973] (Joanna Russ)
- "On the Downhill Side" [Best Short Story nominee, 1973] (Harlan Ellison)
- "The Fifth Head of Cerberus" [Best Novella nominee, 1973] (Gene Wolfe)
- "When We Went to See the End of the World" [Best Short Story nominee, 1973] (Robert Silverberg)
- "Goat Song" [Best Novelette winner, 1973] (Poul Anderson)
- "The Nebula Awards"
- "The Hugo Awards"

== Reception ==
Kirkus Reviews assessed the anthology as "[f]irst-rate," stating it "deserves an award itself," and commenting individually on all the pieces contained except the Pohl. In particular, Rotsler is praised for "creat[ing] a new science fictional art form," and the reviewer notes that Clarke "finds wonder in the old man confronts-Jupiter theme," Russ "writes powerfully of a society of women," Ellison "spins a delicate fantasy of salvation," and Wolfe "provides a complex and subtle variation on the ... subject of clones."

P. Schuyler Miller in Analog Science Fiction/Science Fact praises editor Asimov's introduction as "thoughtful ... as good an analysis as we have had of what science fiction is, how it is fundamentally different from other genre fiction ... and why it stands a good chance of surviving when fiction per se seems on its way out." He feels the appendix renders the book "a valuable reference" and comments on the pieces by Russ, Ellison ("one of the author's new, lovely, and 'atypical' ... cycle of stories about New Orleans"), and Wolfe ("recommended enthusiastically"), while noting the remaining ones.

The book was also reviewed by W. N. MacPherson in The Science Fiction Review Monthly, issue #7, September 1975, and Richard Delap in Delap's F & SF Review, v. 1, no. 7, October 1975.

== Awards ==
The collection placed tenth in the 1974 Locus Poll Award for Best Reprint Anthology/Collection.
