= Nebula Award Stories 6 =

1971 anthology edited by Clifford D. Simak

- First edition (UK)
- Author: edited by Clifford D. Simak
- Language: English
- Series: Nebula Award Stories
- Genre: Science fiction
- Publisher: Gollancz (UK); Doubleday (US)
- Publication date: 1971
- Publication place: United Kingdom
- Media type: Print (hardcover)
- Pages: 220 pp.
- ISBN: 0-575-01337-0
- Preceded by: Nebula Award Stories 5
- Followed by: Nebula Award Stories 7

Nebula Award Stories 6 is an anthology of award-winning science fiction short works edited by Clifford D. Simak. It was first published in the United Kingdom in hardcover by Gollancz in November 1971. The first American edition was published by Doubleday in December of the same year. Paperback editions followed from Pocket Books in the U.S. in 1972, and Panther in the U.K. in December 1973. The American editions bore the variant title Nebula Award Stories Six. The book has also been published in German.

== Summary ==
The book collects pieces published in 1970 that won or were nominated for the Nebula Awards for novella, novelette and short story for the year 1971 and nonfiction pieces related to the awards, together with an introduction by the editor. Not all non-winning pieces nominated for the awards were included. There was no winner for Best Short Story.

== Contents ==
- "Introduction" (Clifford D. Simak)
- "Science Fiction and Literary Tradition" [essay] (Thomas D. Clareson)
- "Slow Sculpture" [Best Novelette winner, 1971] (Theodore Sturgeon)
- "In the Queue" [Best Short Story nominee, 1971] (Keith Laumer)
- "The Island of Doctor Death and Other Stories" [Best Short Story nominee, 1971] (Gene Wolfe)
- "Ill Met in Lankhmar" [Best Novella winner, 1971] (Fritz Leiber)
- "Continued on Next Rock" [Best Novelette nominee, 1971] (R. A. Lafferty)
- "By the Falls" [Best Short Story nominee, 1971] (Harry Harrison)
- "The Second Inquisition" [Best Novelette nominee, 1971] (Joanna Russ)
- "Nebula Awards 1965-1970"

== Reception ==
Author John Walters calls "[a]ll the stories in the book ... at least entertaining and at most masterful. It’s not what I would consider one of the best Nebula volumes, but it has some good material." He feels it "leans towards the traditional after a New Wave sweep of the Nebulas the year before." He cites the Sturgeon and Leiber stories as "represent[ing] traditional approaches to storytelling," praising the former in particular as "a very carefully written, nuanced piece of work." Observing that "[t]his year was the first and only year that no award was given in the short story category," he calls the decision "a shameful mistake," feeling "any one of [the nominated stories] might have won," and noting that "I have since read many Nebula Award winning stories, and a number of them were inferior to the stories that were nominated but did not win in 1970." He speculates that the voting of no award might have been "a reaction to the predominance of New Wave selections" nominated.

The anthology was also reviewed by George Turner in SF Commentary no. 26, 1972. Its appearance in paperback was briefly noted, without comment, by P. Schuyler Miller in his review of the follow-up volume, Nebula Award Stories 7 (1972).
