= The Ythri =

1975 science fiction board wargame

Second edition, cover art by Winchell Chung

The Ythri is a board wargame published by Metagaming Concepts in 1975 that is based on the 1973 science fiction novel The People of the Wind by Poul Anderson.

== Background ==
In Anderson's novel, set on the planet Avalon, human settlers have, for many generations, lived in peace with the Ythri, an indigenous winged race. A Terran space fleet invades the planet, forcing the humans to choose between Ythri and Terrans.

== Description ==
The Ythri is a two-player wargame in which one player takes the role of the residents of Avalon, and the other controls the Terran space fleet. Play is divided between space combat using a space map, and land combat using the planetary map.

=== Components ===
The ziplock bag contains:

- 14" x 17" paper hex grid space map
- 17" x 18" paper hex grid map of Avalon
- 242 die-cut counters
- rulebook
- Combat Results Table

== Publication history ==
In 1974, Howard Thompson designed a science fiction space combat game titled Stellar Conquest, and formed Metagaming Concepts to publish it. The following year, Metagaming acquired the game license for Poul Anderson's 1973 novel People of the Wind, and Thompson designed The Ythri. The first edition, packaged in a ziplock bag, featured a black & white sketch of space combat. In 1976, Metagaming released a second ziplock-bagged edition with slightly revised rules and full color artwork by Winchell Chung.

== Reception ==
In Issue 5 of Perfidious Albion, Charles Vasey and Geoff Barnard traded comments about the game. Barnard noted, "The game seemed quite interesting to receive and study, although the physical quality is not the best. However, playing the game revealed some problems in play-interest. For example, once the ground forces are landed, the space combat which should continue is pointless! ... an interesting system, especially if you have read [The People of the Wind]." Vasey replied, "It certainly is most important that one has read the book, as it certainly brings the otherwise boring maps to life ... I feel that most of the [problems with the combat system] are due to the 'primitive' system used." Barnard concluded "Not the best of games. It should be possible to put this right, maybe with altered victory condition." Vasey concluded, "This is not a game I really enjoyed ... for all this, it is one of the few games to simulate this kind of warfare in a reasonably realistic manner."

In 1976, reviews appeared in four consecutive issues of The Space Gamer:

- In Issue 5, Rick Mataka gave a positive review, saying, "The Ythri is a game simulation I can recommend for any gamer. For the beginner this is a game that is easy to learn. For the Veteran it is a game that can be challenging."
- In Issue 6, Norman Howe was also impressed, writing, "The Ythri is a fine game, with great potential. It's one of the few I've seen which provides sufficient numbers of spare counters to work with. This versatility definitely outweighs any problems with the basic scenario."
- In Issue 7, Tim Hawkinson noted some issues, but concluded, "All in all, playability is good. As the rules note, it is a good idea to make a few alterations with the rules to suit your taste. But basically, The Ythri provides a good scenario, and Metagaming Concepts should be commended for another great game."
- In Issue 8, William Brogen gave a positive review, saying, "This is an innovative and mind-stretching game with a lot to offer, both as the basic game and as a base to build on."

In his 1977 book The Comprehensive Guide to Board Wargaming, Nicholas Palmer thought that only Poul Anderson fans would be interested, calling this game a "lively, simple simulation [...] mainly suitable for readers of [Anderson's novel]."
