= Nebula Award Stories 5 =

1970 anthology edited by James Blish

- First edition (UK)
- Author: edited by James Blish
- Language: English
- Series: Nebula Award Stories
- Genre: Science fiction
- Publisher: Gollancz (UK); Doubleday (US)
- Publication date: 1970
- Publication place: United Kingdom
- Media type: Print (hardcover)
- Pages: 216 pp.
- ISBN: 0-575-00579-3
- Preceded by: Nebula Award Stories 4
- Followed by: Nebula Award Stories 6

Nebula Award Stories 5 is an anthology of award-winning science fiction short works edited by James Blish. It was first published in the United Kingdom in hardcover by Gollancz in November 1970. The first American edition was published by Doubleday in December of the same year. Paperback editions followed from Pocket Books in the U.S. in January 1972, and Panther in the U.K. in December 1972. The American editions bore the variant title Nebula Award Stories Five. The book has also been published in German.

== Summary ==
The book collects pieces published in 1969 that won or were nominated for the Nebula Awards for novella, novelette and short story for the year 1970 and nonfiction pieces related to the awards, together with an introduction by the editor. Not all non-winning pieces nominated for the awards were included.

== Contents ==
- "Introduction" (James Blish)
- "A Boy and His Dog" [Best Novella winner, 1970] (Harlan Ellison)
- "Nine Lives" [Best Novelette nominee, 1970] (Ursula K. Le Guin)
- "Passengers" [Best Short Story winner, 1970] (Robert Silverberg)
- "Not Long Before the End" [Best Short Story nominee, 1970] (Larry Niven)
- "Time Considered as a Helix of Semi-Precious Stones" [Best Novelette winner, 1970] (Samuel R. Delany)
- "The Man Who Learned Loving" [Best Short Story nominee, 1970] (Theodore Sturgeon)
- "The SF Novel in 1969" [essay] (Darko Suvin)
- "Short SF in 1968" [essay] (Alexei Panshin)

== Reception ==
P. Schuyler Miller, writing in Analog Science Fiction/Science Fact, called the anthology "less appealing than in most previous years—not because the stories are poorer, but because you have probably read most of them in other anthologies." For those deciding they have already "read too much of the book," he recommends the previous year's volume, which he notes is now out in paperback. After surveying the already-anthologized pieces and where they have appeared, Miller comments on the "one story which may be strange," the Sturgeon piece, "a point-of-view story, and the point it makes is one that even the New Left must call relevant. They may not like it." He also highlights the essays summing up the year's SF novels and short stories.

The anthology was also reviewed by Paul Walker in Science Fiction Review no. 43, 1971, Alfred J. van der Poorten in SF Commentary no. 20, 1971, and Ted Pauls in The WSFA Journal no. 77, June-July 1971.
