= Operation Luna =

Science fantasy novel by Poul Anderson

- First edition cover
- Author: Poul Anderson
- Cover artist: Julie Bell
- Language: English
- Genre: Fantasy
- Publisher: Tor Books
- Publication date: August 1999
- Publication place: United States
- Media type: Book
- Pages: 316 (hardcover); 438 (paperback)
- ISBN: 0-312-86706-9 (hardcover); ISBN 0-8125-8027-3 (paperback, 2000)
- OCLC: 41035473
- Dewey Decimal: 813/.54 21
- LC Class: PS3551.N378 O54 1999
- Preceded by: Operation Chaos

Operation Luna is a science fantasy novel by American writer Poul Anderson, published in August 1999; it is the sequel to the 1971 fixup novel Operation Chaos by the same author.

It centers around a space flight attempt and the efforts of Coyote and several Oriental antagonists to stop it. The IRS (Inquisition for Revenue Securement) and NASA (National Astral Spellcraft Administration) also become involved.

The two main characters from Operation Chaos, Steve Matuchek, a werewolf and engineer for Nornwell Scrytronics, and Virginia "Ginny" Matuchek continue in their fight against the forces of evil. Now married and in their 40s, they have three children—Val, the child they rescued from Hell in Operation Chaos when she was 3, now 14–15 years old; Ben, 10 years old; and Chryssa, 4 years old.

A few characters from Operation Chaos also reappear, such as Barney Sturlason, Steve's boss, and Bob Shining Knife, a Native American F.B.I. agent, though they have small roles in this novel.

== Plot summary ==
The world of Operation Luna (as well as Operation Chaos) has an alternative history, which mostly resembled our own until a great "Awakening" brought awareness of supernatural forces to the world at large. This Awakening led to drastic changes in society; industrial machinery was largely replaced by technology driven by magic, spells, and "goetic forces" instead of fossil fuels and electricity. For example, the main mode of transportation is broomsticks and magic carpets fitted with cabins for people to sit in; radios are called "runers," apparently activated by runes; and the propulsion behind space flight is achieved by a combination of mechanical technology, spelled crystals, and arcane materials such as mummy dust.

Steve helped in the construction of a spacecraft for Operation Selene, the United States' first attempt to send a crewed craft to the Moon. However, a disaster caused by beings adverse to the mission destroys the vehicle and nearly kills the celestonaut, Curtice Newton, although Steve, in wolf form, saves her.

Afterward, Steve, Ginny, and a handful of people begin to investigate the disaster and make plans to put Operation Luna into effect, a smaller version of Operation Selene independent from NASA.

Since the identities of the entities behind the Operation Selene disaster remain somewhat veiled and mysterious, Steve and Ginny enlist the help of a number of people, including Balawahdiwa, a Zuni high priest; Fotherwick-Botts, an enchanted sword that can talk; and Fjalar, a Norwegian dwarf who forged Fotherwick-Botts.

Though the characters live in Gallup, New Mexico, the characters travel to various other locations in their investigations, including London, England, various parts of Norway, and even Yggdrasil, the legendary Norse site of the World Tree. The time period is roughly in the late 1990s.

Although vague, their initial investigations reveal that the malevolent spirits who collaborated with Coyote are Asian in origin, leading them to suspect a connection to Dr. Fu Ch'ing, a Chinese scientist, government agent, and thaumaturge. (The U.S.' largest competitor for space exploration in the novel is China rather than Russia.) Meanwhile, the F.B.I. suspects Ginny's brother, Will, an astronomer who helped in the planning of Operation Selene and who has an interest in Chinese culture and connections with people in the country. Steve and Ginny themselves worry that he may be possessed by an evil spirit, though tests reveal no trace of a foreign entity.

== Themes ==
There are a number of themes explored in this book. Among them are:

- Religious diversity: Although the narrator, Steve, hints at his and his wife's vague Christianity mitigated by agnosticism, and the existence of a "One True God" is assumed, the reality of a diverse number of religious traditions is affirmed, including Native American (specifically Zuni) beliefs, Norse mythology, Asian traditions (specifically Chinese mythology), and Judaism (in a small part, as Steve regards the holiness of his Jewish neighbors with reverence). Though Steve sees deities in other pantheons as powerful creatures subservient to the power of the One True God, the beliefs of followers have an important role in the power and disposition toward the humanity of such beings. Also, holiness is regarded as something admirable in and of itself, no matter the tradition, so long as the spiritual principles behind it are benign.
- Political satire: As in Operation Chaos, Anderson's libertarian ideas are reflected in the portrayal of government. While Anderson had a disdain for some leftist ideas (such as protestation against scientific research and anarchist ideals, more clearly evident in Operation Chaos), his criticism of "big government" and bureaucracy also shines through, as the I.R.S. draws the characters into a financial nightmare, beleaguering them with obscure tax codes.
- Racism and colonialism: Because the site of Operation Selene is amidst Native American reservations, the characters confront the question of white atrocities. Some Native Americans see NASA's site as an incursion on sacred land, while others bless the site with protection spells. Steve deals with these issues by asserting to his companion, Balawahdiwa, and several deities whom he encounters, that though whites have engaged in horrible things, so have Native Americans, citing everything from large mammals in North America to the more malicious activities of tribes such as the Apache and Anasazi. Although Steve's (and perhaps Anderson's) view may be seen as a case of special pleading, those who ally with him agree that the forces they fight against are malevolent to the Earth itself, to humanity and nature, not just to whites. Colonial attitudes are also exposed in other characters, such as Fotherwick-Botts, largely an English nationalist (since most of his battles were carried out by Englishmen), who has a prejudice against "natives".
- Scientific progress: With the very different principles that their world operates under, Steve and Will discuss the possible limitations of technology without the influence of magic. For example, they imagine what it would be like if Albert Einstein and Max Planck did not synthesize their ideas, which would result in separate theories of relativity and quantum mechanics. Also, the relevance and viability of space exploration is also questioned. Though not given as much space as might be expected, Anderson was a supporter of space exploration, and the adversity encountered by public and governmental voices is challenged by the benefits that will be gained through knowledge of the cosmos.
- Gender roles: Though not directly discussed, some of the characters, especially Ginny, are powerful women, and some of the male characters (such as Fjalar and Fotherwick-Botts) have more traditional views of women as domestic servants. However, even those characters come to respect the power that the women have, and Steve, who fits a largely masculine stereotype, often remarks that Ginny has much more power than he does, and in several situations he has to sit aside while she effects spells or does research he is not able to do.

== Publication details ==
Operation Chaos and Operation Luna were published together in 1999 by the Science Fiction Book Club as Operation Otherworld.
