= Starfarers =

1998 novel by Poul Anderson

- First edition
- Author: Poul Anderson
- Cover artist: John Harris
- Language: English
- Genre: Science fiction
- Publisher: Tor Books
- Publication date: 1998
- Publication place: United States
- Media type: Print (Hardback)
- Pages: 383
- ISBN: 0-312-86037-4

Starfarers is a science fiction novel by Poul Anderson. It was first published in hardcover by Tor Books in November 1998; a book club edition was issued by Tor in conjunction with the Science Fiction Book Club in April 1999, followed by a paperback edition from Tor. An ebook version was published by Gateway/Orion in September 2011.

== Plot ==
Earth sends out a spaceship to investigate starfaring in far distant space of which traces have been found. The ship Envoy, bearing a crew of six men and four women, travels at a speed close to the speed of light. At the end of the journey the crew meets a Centaur-like species on a planet they call Tahir that has left spacefaring behind. Sentient life is also detected in connection with a nearby black hole, a reading confirmed by the Tahirans. Their interest aroused, the Earthlings can send a combined crew to investigate.

Communications with this "Holont" is established and much knowledge is acquired. Differences aboard the ship, however, lead to the death of three men (Brent, Russek, and Cleland), and female pilot Kilbirnie crashes into the black hole. The six Earthlings left drop the Tahirans off at their homeworld and head towards Earth.

In between the story jumps regularly back to the development of human society over the gaps of many thousand years and to that of the Kith, the closed group doing the starfaring, who are often shunned by the rest of Earth. The Kith have their own settlements on different planets, where some retire from time to time.

Earth has changed over the long period taken up by the voyage of the Envoy, and no one is much interested in spacefaring anymore. On Harbor, a colony of Earth, the Envoy crew finds remains of the Kith society, which still are connected to spacefaring. But the last ship to plot trade-routes in space, the Fleetwing, disappears from tracking. The cause is a Zero-Zero-failure ripping off the rear part of the ship. The Envoy sets out on a rescue mission as soon as possible but sixteen years of outside time have passed by the time they reach the Fleetwing. They save the remaining crew, thus building a foundation of experienced spacefarers to start spacefaring anew with the knowledge acquired from the Holont.

== Characters ==
- The crew of Envoy
  - Captain Ricardo I. Nansen Aguilar (Paraguay)
  - Pilot Lajos Russek (Hungary)
  - Pilot Jean Kilbernie (Scotland)
  - Engineer Yu Wenji (China)
  - Engineer Alvin Brent (America)
  - Physicist Hanny Dayan (Israel)
  - Planetologist Timothy Cleland
  - Physician Mamphela Mokoena (South Africa)
  - Biochemist Selim Ibn Ali Zeyd (Egypt)
  - Linguist Ajit Nathu Sundaram
- Kith-folk
