= The New America: The New World =

1935 book by H. G. Wells

- First edition
- Author: H. G. Wells
- Language: English
- Genre: Articles
- Publisher: The Cresset Press
- Publication date: 1935
- Publication place: United Kingdom
- Media type: Print (hardback)
- Pages: 96

The New America: The New World is a collection of four articles by H. G. Wells written to examine the American scene, which Wells summed up in 1935 as "the spectacle of a great material civilization, halted, paralyzed." Wells's articles were published shortly after a 23-day visit to the United States in March 1935 that included a lunch with US President Franklin Delano Roosevelt and a talk with Senator Huey Long.

== Synopsis ==
"Man is to-day a challenged animal," Wells wrote in the first article. "He has to respond, he has to respond successfully to the challenge, or he will be overwhelmed—like any other insufficiently adaptable animal." And in the 1930s Wells thought that America's response was the key to the species' response to three principal challenges: "the politico-war problem, the unemployment problem and the finance-monetary problem."

Resistance to solutions of these problems, Wells believed, was due principally to individuals' abiding tendency to be stubbornly attached to their own way of living, their own traditions. Wells detected this resistance as dominating both reactionary movements like fascism in Germany and revolutionary movements like Communism in the Soviet Union.

Wells was concerned at the extent to which he observed what he called "the Raucous Voices" to be at the centre of discussion of social problems in the United States. Among these he numbered Huey Long, Father Coughlin, and Francis Townsend. He was also dismayed at the conduct of what he called "the Inexplicit Men," mostly members of President Roosevelt's Brain Trust. These policymakers, like the New Deal itself and its leader, was in Wells's view not clear enough about its aims, thus increasing the likelihood that one of the "Raucous Voices" would prevail.

Wells was critical of many of the New Deal's economic policies, believing that the effort to impose restrictive controls on production was "biologically and socially unsound" because the release of surplus energy, rather than restraint, is a fundamental aspect of human nature. But he was relatively uncritical of Roosevelt, whom he called "an exceptionally subtle and exalted politician" and "a very strange and great man." Roosevelt's role, according to Wells, was "to sublimate, clarify and express the advancing thought of the community"; in 1935 he saw Roosevelt as principally in a phase of "listening and talking interestedly rather than decisively, of what he was hearing."

Despite the discouraging nature of his observations, Wells concluded with the view that America was the only viable hope for humanity: "No other country has the necessary freedom of speech and mind left, if the conception of the new order is to be worked out." "It is the duty of every civilized man to contribute thought, influence and material help to [President Roosevelt's] effort to make over the worn-out, private capitalism of America, which has produced so much in its time, made such a flourish of hope and performance, and which totters now at last so dangerously—to make that over, if it can be made over, into a renascent progressive modern state." A duty, because the development of American society was crucial for the world: "If America does not go high and resolute and proud, consciously taking the leadership of mankind in the realization of a new way of living, she will go low and she will drag the world down with her."

== Background ==
In the spring of 1934 Wells had conceived the idea of visiting both President Franklin D. Roosevelt and Joseph Stalin; both leaders agreed to see him, and he met both within a few months, describing their meetings at the conclusion of Experiment in Autobiography. His 1935 trip was the result of a commission from Collier's Weekly that was inspired by a desire for a follow-up report. Wells was paid $12,500 (about $213,000 in 2013 buying power, according to the CPI Inflation Calculator) on condition that he give no speeches until after the publication of the book, the rights to which he reserved.

Wells returned to England on 30 March 1935, aboard the RMS Berengaria.
