= Night Piece =

- Short story by Poul Anderson
- First publication, cover art by Ed Emshwiller
- Country: United States
- Language: English
- Genre: Science fiction

Publication
- Published in: The Magazine of Fantasy and Science Fiction
- Publication type: Periodical
- Publisher: Mercury Press
- Media type: Print (Magazine, Hardback & Paperback)
- Publication date: July 1961

"Night Piece" is a science fiction short story by American writer Poul Anderson, first published in the July 1961 issue of The Magazine of Fantasy and Science Fiction. It later appeared in Anderson's 1981 collection The Dark Between the Stars.

== Plot summary ==
The story takes place over the span of a few hours during one night. The unnamed protagonist, a scientist working on extra-sensory perception, leaves work and walks toward home. He is haunted by perceptions of another world, and creatures in it who appear to be malevolent. Through flashbacks, it is revealed that he has accidentally uncovered evidence of a different and superior class of beings, which he calls "Superiors", who co-exist with humans but had previously gone almost undetected. He interprets his visions as reflections of an ongoing struggle in the Superiors' world and finds himself both attracted and repelled by what he sees.

== Commentary ==
In The Worlds of Science Fiction, the author wrote

It's quite unlike anything else I've done...I have no pretensions to being a Kafka or a Capek, but it did seem to me it would be interesting to use, or attempt to use, some of their techniques.
