= Fire Time =

1974 novel by Poul Anderson

- Cover of first edition (hardcover)
- Author: Poul Anderson
- Cover artist: Gary Friedman
- Language: English
- Genre: Science fiction
- Publisher: Doubleday
- Publication date: 1974
- Publication place: United States
- Media type: Print (hardback & paperback)
- Pages: 210 pp
- ISBN: 0-385-05582-X
- OCLC: 1063757
- Dewey Decimal: 813/.5/4
- LC Class: PZ4.A549 Fi PS3551.N378

Fire Time is a science fiction novel by Poul Anderson, first published in 1974. It was nominated for the Hugo Award for Best Novel in 1975.

== Plot introduction ==
Fire Time takes place on the planet Ishtar in the "Anubelea" system, located directly between the Sun and the cluster NGC 6656. Ishtar's peculiar orbit around the three stars of the Anubelea system (Bel, Ea, and Anu) results in the "Fire Time", a dramatic increase in heat every thousand years as the "demon star" Anu approaches the planet. As the northern hemisphere heats up, large numbers of Ishtarians flee south, leading to a collapse of civilization. The northern natives (Valennen) take advantage of the Gathering's (southern natives) culture to win two victories in Valennen territory. The presence of visitors from Earth (also engaged in their own war off-planet at Nasqua) raises the prospect of changing the dynamics of history, though, with Earth involved in an interstellar war of its own, human aid is not guaranteed.

Properties of the members of the Anubelea system
Name	Short description	Stellar classification	Luminosity	Temperature	Mass	Mean distance from Bel	Aphelion from Bel	Perihelion from Bel
Bel	Yellow dwarf	G2V	0.98 L_{☉}	5800 Kelvin	0.95 M_{☉}	—	—	—
Ea	Red dwarf	not given	not given	not given	not given	6000 AU	—	—
Anu	Red giant	not given	280 L_{☉}	not given	1.22 M_{☉}	—	224 AU	40 AU

== Themes and continuity ==
The presence of Gunnar Heim sets this story in the same universe as Anderson's earlier The Star Fox; while both of these books revolve around the theme of conflict, the core themes of Fire Time are more closely related to the Israeli–Palestinian conflict than to the Vietnam War allegory of The Star Fox. Several scenes in particular evoke this connection, particularly the sequence of the historical character Sigurdsson declaring the independence of the republic of Eleutheria in a manner not dissimilar to David Ben-Gurion's declaration of the independence of Israel. Anderson took a more nuanced view to Middle Eastern conflict than he did with America's struggle against communism, a theme also developed in There Will Be Time and some of the stories of his "Time Patrol" sequence. To this end, the focus is more political than military. In particular, Gunnar Heim's reappearance is in a much less mercenary capacity, endorsing peaceful co-existence between the warring humans and aliens.

== See also ==
- HD 181068
- HD 188753
