= Kith (Poul Anderson) =

Starfaring aliens in science fiction

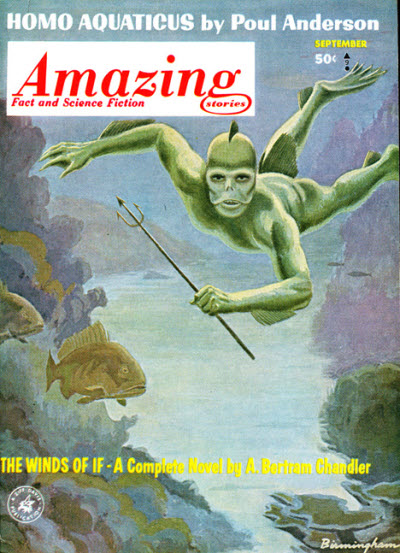
Anderson's "Homo Aquaticus", part of his "Kith" sequence, took the cover of the September 1963 issue of Amazing Stories

The Kith are a starfaring culture featured in a number of science fiction stories by American writer Poul Anderson. They are:

- "Ghetto" (1954)
- "The Horn of Time the Hunter" (also known as "Homo Aquaticus", 1963)
- The novel Starfarers (1998) - John W. Campbell Memorial Award nominee, 1999

The Kith develop out of early interstellar explorers in the 21st and 22nd centuries. Because of the effects of time dilation associated with travel at near-light speeds, the Kith maintain separate settlements ("Kithtowns") in which care was taken to keep their language and culture consistent over the course of millennia. As Kith usually marry among themselves, they seek to avoid in-breeding by a strict exogamy; Kith must find their mates in a ship other their own, marriage between crew members of the same ship being considered a kind of incest.

The Kith view planet-bound cultures with a degree of indifference, in part due to their relatively long lifespans. To the ground-dwellers such attitudes come to seem superior and arrogant, and the Kith's apparent near-immortality arouses envy. Although the Kith are instrumental in maintaining the network of trade that makes human interstellar civilization possible, over time they become the object of derision, suspicion and ultimately persecution.

As set forth in Starfarers and "Ghetto", the Kithtowns ultimately become ghettos, and pogroms are launched against the Kith. "The Horn of Time the Hunter" suggests that the Kith are ultimately forced to flee human space altogether, and chronicles the return of one group of Kith to human space after hundreds of thousands of years' relativistic travel to the Galactic core.
