= Nicholas van Rijn =

Fictional character created by Poul Anderson

Nicholas van Rijn (2376 to c. 2500 AD) is a fictional character who plays the central role in the first half of Poul Anderson's Technic History cycle of stories and novels.

== Description ==
Nicholas van Rijn is a flamboyant capitalist adventurer, and is of Dutch ancestry (apparently a resident of Djakarta, and thus an Indo). His speech is bombastic and heavily laced with unconventional constructs, puns, oaths, and words from various Northern European languages: in particular Dutch, German, and possibly Danish. Although he frequently employs malapropisms such as "Angular-Saxon" or "hunky-dinghy", they are often so devious or apropos as to appear intentional. Some more minor characters have used a similar patois. Van Rijn is well-educated in Earth's literature and history and also displays considerable cunning and capacity for bullying armed aliens into doing his bidding. Although a formidable individual in necessity (his battle cries have included "God send the Right!", "Kristmenn, Krossmenn, Kongsmenn!", and "Heineken Bier!"), he prefers material luxuries to personal heroism. He routinely describes himself as an old, weak, sinful man, but usually follows it by lamenting that his subordinates (or humanity in general) are unable to accomplish anything without his aid. Accordingly, van Rijn's intellect usually proves crucial to solving crises and mysteries that stupefy all other characters. In this regard, he is similar to the character of Mycroft Holmes.

Van Rijn is CEO of the Solar Spice and Liquors Company – a reference to the spice trade with the East Indies, of the Netherlands' Golden Age. In this the character is meant to suggest the Dutch merchant adventurers of that time, and is far closer to them than to the 20th century Dutch. He is libertarian in his philosophy, expressing contempt for government and believing that unfettered commerce is the only path to peace and prosperity. He describes commerce as "swindling each other", enjoys watching yacht races, is two metres tall and "globular" in shape, has a goatee beard, dresses in colourful and anachronistic fashions, wears numerous rings, and is called "Old Nick" by his employees. He routinely speaks in a loud, basso voice which Anderson often likens to the sound of a hurricane or avalanche, much as his physical bulk is often compared to a mountain or a Jovian planet. He is apparently impervious to personal abuse but is angered by stupidity, incompetence, prevarication, and delay. He has never married but has taken many paramours and has at least two natural children. With Sandra Tamarin, the Grand Duchess of the planet Hermes, he has a son, Eric Tamarin-Asmundsen. With a woman named Ramona, he has a daughter, Beatriz (neither one's surname is given); Beatriz's daughter Coya Conyon marries David Falkayn, the other central character of the Polesotechnic League series. Van Rijn swears by a number of saints including Saint Dismas, and has expressed the intention of burning candles in offering (to which another character responded: "Saint Nicholas had best get it in writing"). In times of stress, he has been known to shout "This I have not deserved! Do you hear me!", presumably at God.

In the Dominic Flandry novel A Plague of Masters, taking place centuries after van Rijn's death in the waning days of the Terran Empire, it is noted that van Rijn's adventures have entered deeply into the popular culture of humanity and become the staple of storytellers plying their trade in the marketplaces of more backward planets.

== Critical commentary ==
Algis Budrys, reviewing Trader to the Stars, described van Rijn as "the boorish slob who makes unblushing use of his naked power, wallows in the sensual luxuries attendant on his commercial success and thus makes a splendid pulp hero".

== Origin of the name ==
Anderson was well read in the Viking Period and Medieval history of Denmark. During a civil war in 1372, one Nicolaus van Rin was involved in that country's first recorded use of gunpowder. He tried to smuggle a small barrel each of sulphur and saltpetre to King Valdemar's troops but was caught and executed by a rebellious feudal lord in Ribe.
