= Memory (Poul Anderson) =

1957 novelette by Poul Anderson

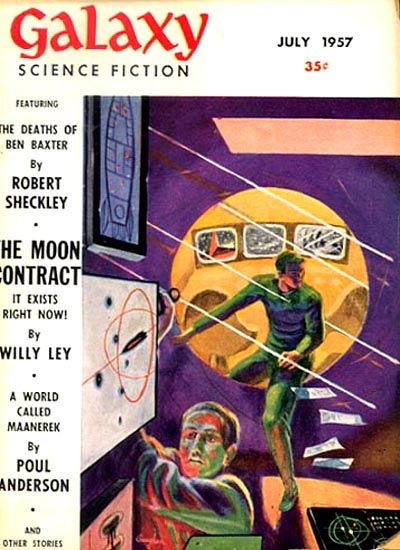
"Memory" was originally published in the July 1957 Galaxy as "A World Called Maanerek" Cover art by Jack Gaughan

"Memory", formerly A World Called Maanerek, is a science fiction novelette by American writer Poul Anderson, first published in the July 1957 issue of Galaxy Science Fiction magazine.

== Plot summary ==
In a far future, people are distributed over numerous planets, many of which have lost contact with Earth's civilisation. On a far ring planet, known as World Called Maanerek by its inhabitants, only a weak memory of Earth has survived, and technology has declined to preindustrial. Maanerek is coveted by a highly developed civilization because it is situated at a location of strategical value.

As the story opens, the protagonist Torrek jumps down onto a large bird with a wing spread of nine meters, kills it and lands with it in the sea, to prove himself worthy of marrying Sonna, a girl of the local tribe.

Torrek and Sonna are seized in invisible bonds and abducted in a spaceship. It is revealed that Torrek was a member of the same military unit of the abductors. In a neurological experiment, he has been sent to Maanerek with his memory emptied, for the sake of infiltrating the natives so that they willingly cooperate. The natives have accepted him as a somewhat strange, but friendly fellow.

With his memory restored, Torrek begins talking as if no time had passed, sharing all the biased views of his military comrades about the natives. He now considers himself the officer Korul Wanen again, and reproaches his leaders for having sent him to the planet, because he could have died there.

They bring him to the girl, hoping to obtain information from her that will make it easier to eradicate her people; but Wanen still feels a strong sympathy towards her. To change that, he is commanded to rape and to kill her. Wanen finds confederates and frees Sonna forcefully. He steals a spaceship and flees, leaving his earlier "civilised" companions behind him, in a fireball.

Though his memory of having been Torrek is gone, Wanen's loyalty is now with the inhabitants of the planet, whom he would help to develop technologically and be better prepared for any new incursion by his former compatriots.

Many competing groups try, each in its own way, to reunite the disparate planets of the former Empire.

== Editions ==
Memory was first published in the Science Fiction magazine Galaxy. It was published together with six other narrations by Anderson in the collection Beyond the Beyond, in 1969.
