= The People of the Wind =

1973 novel by Poul Anderson

- Cover of the first edition
- Author: Poul Anderson
- Cover artist: Fernando Fernandez
- Language: English
- Genre: Science fiction
- Publisher: Signet Books
- Publication date: 1973
- Publication place: United States
- Media type: Print
- Pages: 176
- ISBN: 9780839823537
- OCLC: 64586696

The People of the Wind is a science fiction novel by American writer Poul Anderson, first published in 1973. It was a 1974 nominee of the Nebula Award for Science Fiction. The novel is the last book in Anderson’s Polesotechnic League series. However, since the setting of the book is many generations after the series' two main characters, Nicholas van Rijn and David Falkayn, and many generations before Anderson's follow-up series, the Terran Empire, it is more proper to consider this book a bridge between the two series.

== Synopsis ==
The People of the Wind is a story of the clash of two very different cultures living on a planet named Avalon. One culture consists of people who trace their ancestry to Earth. They have created a highly organized and complex society. The other culture is made up of winged creatures that have remained ‘as free as the wind.’ Despite the unlikelihood of such two different groups forming a unified society, they indeed created a single nation composed of the best of both races. Unfortunately the two groups are forced into a war, and the population of Avalon is forced to choose a side to support. Unless they choose they are going against both.

== Awards ==
- 1974 Hugo Science Fiction Award nominee
- 1974 Locus Award Nominee
- 1974 Nebula Award Nominee

== Publication history ==
The People of the Wind was first published in 1973. It was reprinted by Signet as a mass market paperback on January 17, 1978 and appears in Rise of the Terran Empire, the third volume of the Technic Civilization complete edition published by Baen in 2009 (paperback 2011).

In 1975, Metagaming Concepts published a board wargame titled The Ythri that was based on Anderson's novel.
