= Eutopia (short story) =

Short story by Poul Anderson

"Eutopia" is a short story by American writer Poul Anderson that originally appeared in Harlan Ellison's 1967 science fiction anthology Dangerous Visions. It later appeared in Anderson's 1981 collection The Dark Between the Stars and the showcase The Best Alternate History Stories of the 20th Century (2001).

== Plot ==
At the beginning of the story, the protagonist (Iason Philippou) is exploring various parallel universes. Before the story began, he had visited our world's United States of which he had a very bad impression, considering it "a sick culture". He then came to the timeline where most of the plot is set. In that timeline, Christian Western Europe was overwhelmed in the tenth century by the combined onslaught of the Scandinavian Vikings from the north, the Magyars from the east and the Arabs from the south. Afterwards, the Arab Caliphate disintegrated in internal discord while the Vikings and Magyars, who kept their original religions, dominated Europe and eventually colonized North America. They developed a high technology, including nuclear energy, while keeping much of their Medieval culture and social structures. This North America, divided into numerous independent principalities, is much more sparsely populated than in our world, with large tracts of virtually untouched nature. While being social inferiors to the Scandinavians and Magyars, Native Americans in this timeline seem to have fared better than in our history.

The story beings with Iason on the run, wanted in a Scandinavian realm where he had been a guest and where he had committed an unspecified offence serious enough to justify his being killed out of hand if caught. He makes his way to a Magyar realm where he asks for refuge. While Iason stays there, a Native American woman attempts to seduce him – but he refuses, stating that he is "under vow." In fact, he is in hurry to meet the local Magyar ruler and receive his firm vow that he would not be extradited, before his Scandinavian pursuers had the chance to talk to the Magyar. This caution was well founded – after talking to his Scandinavian counterpart, the Magyar ruler is furious with Iason, saying "You have sucked my vow out of me, if I had known what you had done I would have killed you myself!". However, the vow is unbreakable, and Iason receives transport to where he could finally get to back to his home universe – the self-styled "Eutopia" which gives the story its name, an Earth where classical Greece came to dominate the planet. He checks in with a superior (Daimonax) and complains of the barbarism of the people he has encountered, but Daimonax contradicts him, stating that people have different views on what it means to be civilized, and that Eutopia's carefully planned society may have lost the simple pleasures of life. The story ends as it is revealed that Iason had seduced and slept with a young boy (the son of his Scandinavian earlier host) before the opening of the story. The Scandinavian and Magyar culture have a strong taboo against homosexuality while Iason's world has kept the Classical Greek attitudes. At the conclusion it turns out that the "Niki" to whom the protagonist's thoughts keep turning is the nickname of Nikias, a young boy in Eutopia who is Iason's lover.

== Characters ==
- Iason Philippou – Trader (main character)
- Ottar Thorklesson – His host
- Leif Ottarsson – Ottar's son
- Nikias Demostheneou – Iason's lover
- Daimonax Aristides – Iason's superior, in charge of the project which allows Iason to explore the various universes

== Reception ==
Algis Budrys said that Anderson wrote better "when he is not also attempting to shock people. I think he could do best by contenting himself to lead people to think, as he has been doing for many years now. That's usually shock enough".

== See also ==
- Utopia
