= A Midsummer Tempest =

1974 fantasy novel by Poul Anderson

- First edition cover
- Author: Poul Anderson
- Cover artist: Tim Lewis
- Language: English
- Genre: Alternate history/ Fantasy
- Publisher: Doubleday
- Publication date: 1974
- Publication place: United States
- Media type: Print (hardback & paperback)
- Pages: 207 pp
- ISBN: 0-385-05505-6
- OCLC: 823428
- Dewey Decimal: 813/.5/4
- LC Class: PZ4.A549 Mi PS3551.N378

A Midsummer Tempest is a 1974 alternative history fantasy novel by Poul Anderson. In 1975, it was nominated for the World Fantasy Award for Best Novel and the Nebula Award for Best Novel and won the Mythopoeic Award.

== Plot introduction ==
The setting is in a parallel world where William Shakespeare was not the Bard but the Great Historian. In this world, all the events depicted within Shakespeare's plays were accounts of historical fact, not fiction. As some of the plays depicted anachronistic technology, Anderson extrapolated that this world was more technologically advanced than in reality. However, the fairies of A Midsummer Night's Dream are also part of this world. The novel takes place in the era of Cromwell and Charles I, but the characters deal with the English Civil War which is coeval with an Industrial Revolution. The fairy element provides a plot tension with the more advanced technology.

Although various plays are alluded to, the plot is chiefly shaped by A Midsummer Night's Dream and The Tempest. As part of the homage to Shakespeare, the nobler characters speak in blank verse and at least one sonnet, printed as prose.

== Plot summary ==
Prince Rupert is taken by the Roundheads; held captive at a country house, he falls in love with his captor's niece, Jennifer. One of his troopers, Will Fairweather, followed him to the house where he was held captive; with the help of Jennifer, Will brings him to Oberon and Titania, who offer magical aid. Rupert and Jennifer exchange magic rings that will aid them as long as they are true to each other. Rupert sets out with Will to find the books that Prospero sank, in order to aid King Charles.

Rupert, fleeing Roundheads, finds refuge in a magical inn, The Old Phoenix, which proves to be a nexus between parallel worlds. Inside the tavern, he meets Valeria Matuchek, who is from an alternate history twentieth-century America (Anderson's 1971 novel Operation Chaos, in which her parents meet). Holger Carlsen is another guest, born in a world where the Matter of France is history, and later trapped in "our own" twentieth-century America (the hero of Anderson's Three Hearts and Three Lions). Valeria explains what will happen in the English Civil War in "our" timeline, including the king's execution, strengthening Rupert's determination to change events here. He finds a Spanish ship that will transport him; it is carrying an ambassador and his wife.

Jennifer's Puritan uncle discovers her on her return, when she resolves to use the ring to find Rupert. She is brought, captive, to a port, where the ring enables her to steal a boat and set sail. The ambassador's wife uses a magic potion to seduce Rupert, and the rings fail. Rupert cannot find his way to the island, and Jennifer is stranded at sea. Despairing, Rupert takes to the library at Milan to try to work out where to find the island and books. Jennifer's plight becomes desperate from thirst, but Ariel (from The Tempest) finds her and brings her to the island. Rupert works out the location, and Jennifer and he are reconciled.

They retrieve the books and magically bear them back to England. Charles I has taken up a position near Glastonbury Tor for reasons he does not understand. Rupert attempts the magic; Will Fairweather is possessed by a spirit of England and stirs up the magic of the land. The Roundheads are defeated, and Charles I wins the English Civil War.

At the Old Phoenix, Valeria believes that even if "romantic reactionaries" like Charles I won the English Civil War here, there is still the prospect of technological advance in North America. However, the fairies believed differently—they supported the Cavalier cause to delay the disenchantment of this world.

Rupert and Jennifer return the rings to Oberon and Titania, and retire to a peaceful married life.

== Reception ==
Lester del Rey found Anderson's invention to be "a lovely conceit" and reported the novel to be "a fantasy I can recommend with pleasure." Pittsburgh Post-Gazette reviewer Diana Yates described the novel as "an intriguing 'what-if' story ... that could never be considered historical but is indeed fanciful."

== Trivia ==
The Old Phoenix appears in several of Poul Anderson's short stories as a nexus between worlds.

One of the guards sent to escort Jennifer when she is being used as bait in a trap for the catching of Prince Rupert is named "Nehemiah Scudder". That was the name of the First Prophet in Heinlein's "If This Goes On—".
