= The Dark Between the Stars (short story collection) =

1981 collection of short stories by Poul Anderson

- Author: Poul Anderson
- Cover artist: David Egge
- Language: English
- Genre: Science fiction
- Published: 1987
- Publisher: Berkley Books
- Publication place: United States
- Media type: Print (paperback)
- Pages: 207
- ISBN: 0-425-04291-X

The Dark Between the Stars is a 1981 collection of previously published science fiction short stories by American writer Poul Anderson.

== Contents ==
- "The Sharing of Flesh" (1968) - This story was originally published in Galaxy Science Fiction (December 1968), won a 1969 Hugo Award for Best Novelette and was nominated for a 1969 Nebula Award. It later appeared in the collections The Night Face & Other Stories (1979), Winners (1981) and The Long Night (1983). "The Sharing of Flesh" is about a cannibalistic culture on a distant world.
- "Fortune Hunter" (1972) - Originally published in the Infinity anthology #4, it is a tale of one man's plan to escape from the overpopulated city to the wilderness on a polluted future Earth.
- "Eutopia" (1967) - This story was originally published in Harlan Ellison's noted anthology Dangerous Visions, and later in the Anderson collection Past Times (1984). It chronicles the journey of a man from a stagnant utopia to an alternate Earth in an alternate universe.
- "The Pugilist" (1973) - First appearing in The Magazine of Fantasy & Science Fiction (November 1973), this story is about "espionage in a totalitarian America."
- "Night Piece" (1961) - Also originally published in The Magazine of Fantasy & Science Fiction (July 1961) and later collected in The Gods Laughed (1982), "Night Piece" is about a man "slipping back and forth from reality into a strange primordial plane of existence" thanks to his experiments with ESP. Anderson has called this story one of his personal favorites.
- "The Voortrekkers" (1974) - First published in 1974's Final Stage: The Ultimate Science Fiction Anthology (editors Edward L. Ferman/Barry N. Malzberg) and later collected in Explorations (1981), this story follows a deep space exploration in a future where the recorded personalities and neural patterns of astronauts are imprinted into newly created clones at the journey's end.
- "Gibraltar Falls" (1975) - Originally appearing in The Magazine of Fantasy & Science Fiction (October 1975) and later collected in The Guardians of Time (1981), "Gibraltar Falls" is one of Anderson's Time Patrol stories, a romance set during Earth's distant past. The name means "the waterfall at Gibraltar", and refers to the end of the Messinian salinity crisis.
- "Windmill" (1973) - First appearing in the 1973 anthology Saving Worlds (editors Roger Elwood/Virginia Kidd) and later collected in Maurai and Kith (1982), "Windmill" is a "post-apocalypse environmentalism story" in which the former continental superpowers struggle to rebuild with guidance from the now-politically-dominant Hawaiian islands.
- "Call Me Joe" (1957) - This story was originally published in Astounding Science-Fiction (April 1957) and features a wheelchair-using astronaut on a station orbiting Jupiter who, through the use of special technology, is mentally controlling a genetically engineered creature nicknamed "Joe" who is exploring the planet's surface.

== Reviews ==
Thomas M. Wagner of SFReviews.net wrote that the publisher's marketing of the book as a collection of science fiction horror stories is "totally misleading" and noted "no unifying theme present in these stories remotely related to the horrors of the universe, whatever those might be." Wagner went on to say that the anthology includes some "must-reads" and that "even a middling Poul Anderson story is quite a bit better than what you're likely to get from most anybody else writing these days."
