= The Longest Voyage =

- Novelette by Poul Anderson
- Cover art by John Schoenherr
- Illustrator: John Schoenherr
- Country: United States
- Language: English
- Genre: Science fiction novelette

Publication
- Published in: Analog Science Fiction and Fact
- Publication type: Periodical
- Publisher: Street & Smith
- Media type: Print (Magazine)
- Publication date: December 1960
- Pages: 29
- Award: Hugo Award for Best Short Fiction (1961)

"The Longest Voyage" is a science fiction novelette by American writer Poul Anderson. It won the Hugo Award for Best Short Fiction in 1961.

== Plot summary ==
On a distant world the equivalent of the Age of Exploration is beginning. A party of daring explorers attempts to circumnavigate their world. In unknown waters they encounter an island civilization which claims to have a prophet who fell from the stars.

== Reception ==
"The Longest Voyage" won the 1961 Hugo Award for Best Short Fiction.

Jean-Daniel Brèque has described "The Longest Voyage" as "a rousing adventure yarn", "solidly plotted, like a well-oiled mechanism", and "also a work of poetry".

Gardner Dozois, upon selecting "The Longest Voyage" for inclusion in his 2000 anthology Explorers: SF Adventures to Far Horizons, said that it is "nearly unmatched" in science fiction for its "lyricism, compassion, subtlety, thoughtfulness, and above all the relish it takes in the bristling strangeness and wonder of the world".

Steven H. Silver commented that what distinguishes "The Longest Voyage" from similar stories is that "Anderson provides strong motivation for both the explorers and the natives".
