= Goat Song (novelette) =

- Short story by Poul Anderson
- First publication Cover art by Bert Tanner
- Language: English
- Genre: Science fiction

Publication
- Published in: The Magazine of Fantasy and Science Fiction
- Publication type: Magazine
- Publisher: Mercury Press, Inc.
- Publication date: February 1972
- Publication place: United States
- Media type: Print

"Goat Song" is a science fiction novelette by American writer Poul Anderson. Originally published in The Magazine of Fantasy and Science Fiction issue of February 1972, it was later included in the anthologies Nebula Award Stories Eight and The Hugo Winners Volume 3, as well as in Anderson's collection Homeward and Beyond.

This story has strong parallels to the Greek myth of Orpheus and Eurydice

== Plot summary ==
In a future world humanity is dominated by a massive computer, SUM, which claims to record the soul, and promises a resurrection at an indefinite future date. A harper—who alone remembers the old songs—mourns for the loss of his love, and desires nothing but her resurrection. SUM so far has only used that power to keep its human avatar, the Dark Queen, eternally young. The harper confronts the Dark Queen on a lonely road during her yearly sojourn through the overworld. Appealing to her lingering humanity, she agrees to take the Harper before SUM. In SUM's dark, underground fortress it agrees to return the harper's love, if the harper will teach humanity to worship SUM as a god. But there is one condition: a test of loyalty. The Harper must walk all the way to the outside, but not once look back to see if his love is following. The harper agrees. On the long walk back he is full of doubts, but manages to look straight ahead, until the last moment. He turns and sees his love for an instant before she is taken away, and he is cast outside.

SUM admits that it is more interested in the harper as an antagonist than a servant, since it doesn't yet fully understand the human mind. Harper goes nearly insane for many months, but then begins the deliberate process of using his songs to implant the idea that humans should rule their own lives and that SUM should be destroyed.

Some of his followers take it to much more wild extremes. At the end of the story, he is going to meet some of these women—a parallel to the maenads who tore Orpheus to pieces.

== Awards and nominations ==
- Hugo Award for Best Novelette, winner (1973)
- Locus Poll Award for Best Short Story, third place (1973)
- Nebula Award for Best Novelette, winner (1972)
