= The Sharing of Flesh =

- Short story by Poul Anderson
- Genre: Science fiction

Publication
- Publisher: Galaxy Science Fiction
- Publication date: December 1968

"The Sharing of Flesh" (also published as "The Dipteroid Phenomenon") is a science fiction novelette by American writer Poul Anderson. Originally published in Galaxy Science Fiction (December 1968), it won a 1969 Hugo Award for Best Novelette and was nominated for a 1969 Nebula Award. The story has appeared in the collections The Night Face & Other Stories (1979), The Dark Between the Stars (1981), Winners (1981), and The Long Night (1983).

== Plot summary ==
After a galactic Dark Age, humanity sends an expedition to a primitive human planet, where all cultures practice cannibalism as a rite of manhood. When one of the expedition members is killed, his wife embarks on a mission of vengeance.

Evalyth Sairn is a woman of Kraken, from a society where both sexes learn the art of combat. She accompanies her husband Donli, a scientist from the civilized world Atheia, to a planet that reverted to complete savagery during the collapse of galactic civilization. She manages camp security for the expedition.

Donli is killed and eviscerated by Moru, a local guide, while out on an expedition. The whole incident is recorded by the camera on Donli's communicator while Evalyth watches in horror. After recovering from the shock, she begins to study Moru's people, discovering their bizarre rites of passage where young boys eat certain organs of men, usually slaves, criminals, or prisoners of war, in order to become men. The organs Moru took from Donli match those used in the rites. Moru himself was lame and too poor to buy them from the usual sources.

At first, Evalyth is consumed by the need for vengeance. Under the terms of the expedition, each member is allowed to live by their own customs, which in her society demand blood for blood. With the aid of an artificial intelligence she finds a way of tracking Moru by detecting the unique chemical makeup of Donli's body. With Moru in captivity, she begins to doubt that Donli would have wanted her to kill for him and instead looks at the problem the way Donli himself might have. Instead of assuming that the rites are mere customs, she asks the AI for other possibilities. The AI offers the example of dung flies (the Diptera mentioned in the alternate title) which have evolved to depend on nutrients from prey insects. The conclusion is that Moru's people have lost the ability to undergo maturation without hormones from the cannibalism. The camp doctor informs her that once the genetic defect is found, it can be easily cured.

Moru is brought before her. Although she intended to kill him, she announces that she had her revenge by imagining that nothing would be done for his people, and they would live in fear forever. Producing a knife, she cuts his bonds, ordering him to remember Donli.

== See also ==
- Cannibalism in popular culture
