= New America (short story collection) =

Anthology of short stories written by Poul Anderson

Cover of the first edition, published by Tor Books. Art by Tom Kidd.

New America is a science fiction short story collection by American writer Poul Anderson, published in 1982.

== Reception ==
Michael J. Lowrey reviewed New America in Ares Magazine Special Edition #2 and commented that "Taken in toto, this is a very good collection which deserves repackaging in a more straightforward manner."
