= The Devil's Game (novel) =

Novel by Poul Anderson

First edition (publ. Pocket Books) Cover art by Carlos Ochagavia

The Devil's Game is a novel by Poul Anderson published in 1980.

== Plot summary ==
The Devil's Game is a novel centered around seven people who were brought together to play in a high-stakes game.

== Reception ==
Greg Costikyan reviewed The Devil's Game in Ares Magazine #6, and commented that "Anderson certainly has not let himself stagnate; indeed, his metamorphosis is all the more striking in a writer of settled style. It is to be devoutly desired that The Devil's Game receives the attention it deserves from the mainstream audience."

== Reviews ==
- Review by Tom Easton (1981) in Analog Science Fiction/Science Fact, March 30, 1981
- Review by Theodore Sturgeon (1981) in Rod Serling's The Twilight Zone Magazine, June 1981
- Review by Keith Soltys (1986) in Fantasy Review, January 1986
