= The Man Who Came Early =

Short story by Poul Anderson

"The Man Who Came Early" is a 1956 science fiction short story by American author Poul Anderson. It follows a 20th-century United States Army soldier who is transported to 10th-century Iceland. Similar in some respects to Mark Twain's A Connecticut Yankee in King Arthur's Court and L. Sprague de Camp's Lest Darkness Fall, Anderson's story sharply differs from Twain and de Camp's in his treatment of the "primitive" society in which the time traveler finds himself and his assessment of a modern person's chances of survival in such a society.

"The Man Who Came Early" was first published in the June 1956 issue of The Magazine of Fantasy and Science Fiction. It was reprinted in The Best from Fantasy and Science Fiction, Sixth Series and the Anderson collection The Horn of Time. In the 2010 collection Fragile and Distant Suns, this story is included under the name "Early Rise".

== Plot ==
The story is presented in the first person, related by a late-10th-century Icelander named Ospak Ulfsson five years after its events to a Norwegian priest. During a thunderstorm, an unexplained phenomenon involving a lightning strike transports 20th-century U.S. Army Military Police Corps Sergeant Gerald Roberts (called "Gerald Samsson" by the Icelanders) back in time 1,000 years from his Iceland Defense Force posting at Reykjavík in the 1950s to Ospak's homestead in the 990s. Gerald is assumed to be a shipwreck survivor and taken in by Ospak and his family—his wife Ragnhfld, his son Helgi, his daughter Thorgunna, and their ten thralls and carles.

As he adapts to his situation and settles in, Gerald suffers from culture shock in pre-modern Icelandic society. When he explains (using concepts familiar to the Icelanders) that the American justice system renders blood feuds unnecessary, the Icelanders mistakenly believe the busy American king must enforce the law himself instead; his explanation of military policing surprises Helgi, a royal guardsman for Olaf Tryggvason, who cannot believe someone would willingly offend so many soldiers; his admission that his family rents an apartment confuses Thorgunna, who assumed his high-quality clothing signified landowning wealth; and his remark that the Selective Service System can even draft farmers at harvest time is viewed with abhorrence on the assumption it would leave communities to starve. In turn, the Icelanders are astonished by Gerald's seemingly unremarkable belongings, including his "fire sticks", helmet, modern minted coins, pencil and notebook, and switchblade, and are intrigued by his mentions of "the aitchbomb", "New Jorvik or the like", and the ability for Americans to "talk from one end of the land to another".

Gerald believes his modern American sensibilities and background as an engineering student can prove helpful, but his lack of practical know-how and oversophisticated ideas (such as modern sailboats and early-modern cannons) prove to be incompatible with the technological level and overall nature of 10th-century life. As he discovers when put to work, his knowledge of 20th-century trades and handiwork does not translate to 10th-century smithing, weaving, carpentry, or cooking, but the Icelanders are impressed by his combatives skills in a practice fight with Ketill, Thorgunna's suitor from Hjalmar Broadnose's clan.

The Ulfsson clan, joined by Hjalmar, Ketill, and Gerald (who belongs to neither clan), take a rowboat to Ísafjörður. While making camp, Gerald sings "Red River Valley", though his audience is unimpressed by its unusual sound and structure. When an argument sparks over Ketill's disdain for Gerald, whom Thorgunna has fallen in love with, Gerald invites Ketill to fight, expecting mere fisticuffs, and is surprised to learn he has inadvertently challenged Ketill to a duel to the death. Wielding only an axe against Ketill's sword and shield, Gerald fares poorly and is wounded before drawing his "fire-spitting club" and shooting Ketill in the head, killing him. The use of "magic" in the duel renders the killing dishonorable and thus illegal, and Gerald's arguments of self-defense are ignored. With Ospak and Thorgunna unable to vouch for him at risk of sparking a blood feud, Hjalmar and a reluctant Ospak order Gerald to leave. Embittered, but understanding he must abide by the rules of this time and not his own, Gerald kisses Thorgunna and leaves.

After Gerald's departure, news of his presence and actions spreads across Iceland, and he becomes a wandering outlaw, hunted by Hjalmar and his clan. Gerald battles them at Humpback Fell, inflicting several casualties with his gun before running out of ammunition; taking a fallen opponent's sword, Gerald valiantly fights off several clansmen in a last stand before being killed. Under the belief he was a crazed warlock, Gerald's body and all of his belongings, including the switchblade he gave Ospak, are burned and buried in a barrow that is quickly forgotten about. As Ospak concludes his story, he admits that he believed Gerald's claims of having traveled through time, and muses that in 1,000 years, when "young United States men" like Gerald arrive on Iceland to "to help defend us in a year when the end of the world hovers close", some of them might see Gerald's barrow and, fantasizing on the assumption he was an ancient Icelandic hero, "wish they had lived long ago in his time when men were free".

== Reception ==
Steven H Silver has described the story as "a response to" L. Sprague de Camp's Lest Darkness Fall, while Jo Walton states that it is an outright rejection of de Camp.

Black Gate considers it "first rate", while Paul A. Carter states that, as a "tale of the modern man displaced in time to a harsh and unforgiving environment which dooms him", it is "more sophisticated" than Nat Schachner's "Master Gerald of Cambray".

== See also ==
- G.I. Samurai – 1979 Japanese film that similarly follows 20th-century soldiers faring poorly after being transported to the post-classical era
