= Operation Chaos (novel) =

1971 science fantasy fixup novel by Poul Anderson

- Cover of first edition (hardcover)
- Author: Poul Anderson
- Cover artist: Pat Steir
- Language: English
- Genre: Science fantasy
- Publisher: Doubleday
- Publication date: 1971
- Publication place: United States
- Media type: Print (hardback & paperback)
- ISBN: 0-385-00588-1
- Followed by: Operation Luna

Operation Chaos is a 1971 science fantasy fixup novel by American writer Poul Anderson. A sequel, Operation Luna, was published in 1999.

== Synopsis ==
In an alternate world, where the existence of God has been scientifically proven and magic has been harnessed for the practical needs of the adept by the degaussing of cold iron, the United States is part of an alternative Second World War in which the enemy is not Germany but a resurgent Islamic Caliphate, which has invaded the United States. Werewolf Steven Matuchek and witch Virginia Graylock meet on a military mission to stop the invading Islamic army from unleashing a secret superweapon, a genie released from a bottle in which it had been sealed by King Solomon. Together, they fight against the demon and incidentally fall in love with each other.

After the end of the war (an Allied victory as in our World War II, but US forces remain in occupation of former enemy lands for much longer) the two of them continue and deepen their liaison and have various additional adventures (which were originally published as a series of independent stories). Among other things they stop an elemental summoned as a student prank which had gone amok, confront a succubus/incubus on their honeymoon, and enter the hell dimension to save their daughter (who has been kidnapped and taken there, with a changeling left in her crib in her place).

While in Hell the protagonists are at a loss to understand the identity of a moustached man with a strange armband who speaks with a strong Germanic accent, and why the most powerful demons tremble at the sight of him, or why he uses the "ancient and honorable symbol of the fylfot". Their alternative history never had a Nazi Germany.

Another part of the book features a magical analogue to the counterculture of the 1960s, presented rather facetiously. Given the supernatural metaphysics of this world, however, it takes the form of gnosticism, within a "Johannine Church" that is based on either an esoteric reading of the Gospel of John, or an alternative gnostic gospel version of that canonical New Testament book.

In his werewolf form, Matuchek does not suffer many of the liabilities of a werewolf of folklore. He remains himself while turning into a wolf, and is able to fully use his four-leg incarnation to fight various enemies; and in this magical world, there is no social stigma attached to lycanthropy. Dependence on the moon is lightly tossed aside with a comment that the necessary components of moonlight (specific frequencies of polarized light) have been isolated, and his Polaroid "Were-flash" lets him turn into a wolf or back to his human form at any time, its controls having been designed to be operable even with paws and no opposable thumbs. However, his invulnerability to silver is limited. Conservation of mass makes him a rather large wolf, although other weres in the book, taking far more drastic forms, have more serious problems. (A 600-pound weretiger has to be a 600-pound man in human form, again in order to not violate the law of conservation of mass.)

The couple's daughter, Valeria Matuchek, appears as a minor character in Anderson's A Midsummer Tempest—where she is a self-assured young woman, exploring by herself the various timelines. In a mysterious "Inn Between the Worlds" she meets with Prince Rupert of the Rhine, the main character of Midsummer Tempest, as well as meeting Holger Carlsen, the protagonist of Three Hearts and Three Lions and helping him in his own quest.

== Magazine publication ==
The four stories that make up the fixup novel were originally published in The Magazine of Fantasy and Science Fiction:

- "Operation Afreet", September 1956
- "Operation Salamander", January 1957
- "Operation Incubus", October 1959
- "Operation Changeling" (serial), May–June 1969

== See also ==
- Magic, Inc., a similar fantasy world by Robert Heinlein
- The Case of the Toxic Spell Dump, a similar fantasy world by Harry Turtledove
