= No Truce with Kings =

1963 novella by Poul Anderson

No Truce With Kings
- First publication, cover art by Ed Emshwiller
- Author: Poul Anderson
- Genre: Science fiction
- Publisher: The Magazine of Fantasy and Science Fiction
- Publication date: June 1963
- Awards: Hugo Award for Best Short Fiction (1964); Prometheus Hall of Fame Award (2010)

"No Truce With Kings" is a science fiction novella by American writer Poul Anderson. It won the Hugo Award for Best Short Fiction in 1964, and the Prometheus Award for Classic Fiction (the Hall of Fame award) in 2010. The title is taken from Rudyard Kipling's poem "The Old Issue" (1899), in which kings represent tyranny or other forms of imposed rule, to be fought to preserve hard-won individual freedoms.

== Plot ==
In a post-apocalyptic United States, the Pacific States of America are convulsed by a bloody civil war backed on one side by the "Espers", a movement that claims its followers can achieve great psychic powers. However the Espers are just a front for an even more unusual group.

The story explores the balance of social forms, from feudal to super-state, and warns of the dangers of forced nation-building. It begins with the Pacific coast divided into a collection of clans with a weak central government, following some form of global war and collapse. A war breaks out, generated by people who sincerely believe that replacing the clans with a strong, overarching government is necessary for the future. Unknown to them, there are forces behind the scenes manipulating the situation through the pacifist "esper" colonies. Eventually, the clan leaders discover that the "espers" are a fraud; they use advanced technology to perform their "psychic" acts. Knowing this, the inherent superiority of the clan system slowly defeats the regular government forces, eventually taking San Francisco.

There, artillery damage reveals the great secret: one of San Francisco's skyscrapers houses an alien spacecraft. Confronting the aliens, the clansmen are told that the aliens are trying to manipulate human society into a pacifist one, without which their science predicts war and death. When told that their machinations have already resulted in war and death, the aliens plead that their science is not exact. The ensuing argument encapsulates the point of the story quite effectively; that people should be allowed to think for themselves, and form a society which they choose for themselves, rather than one chosen and imposed by an external body, no matter how wise and noble the intent.

According to Jerry Pournelle's foreword in " Day of the Tyrant: There Will Be War vol IV ", Poul Anderson asserted, "The do-gooders get their comeuppance."

== Reception ==
Algis Budrys faulted the story as "a-flicker with confusing scene changes [and] stuffed with narrative compressions and a pale army of sketched characters," suggesting Anderson's conception required lengthier treatment to be successful. However, other critical and fan acclaim is positive with the work winning the year's Hugo award.
