= Karen Anderson (writer) =

American fantasy writer (1932–2018)

- Born: June Millichamp Kruse; September 16, 1932; Erlanger, Kentucky, U.S.
- Died: March 17, 2018 (aged 85); Sunland-Tujunga, Los Angeles, California, U.S.
- Occupations: Writer, editor
- Writing career
- Period: 1958–2018
- Genre: Fantasy

Karen Anderson (born June Millichamp Kruse /ˈkruːzi/; September 16, 1932 – March 17, 2018) was an American writer. She published fiction and essays solo and in collaboration with her husband Poul Anderson and others.

== Biography ==
Anderson was born June Millichamp Kruse in Erlanger, Kentucky, a suburb of Cincinnati, Ohio.

In the 1980s she co-authored several books in collaboration with her husband, Poul Anderson.

She was the first person to use the term filk music in print; she also wrote the first published science fiction haiku (or scifaiku), "Six Haiku" (The Magazine of Fantasy and Science Fiction, July 1962). In 1950 she, along with three friends, founded a Sherlock Holmes society, naming it the "Red Circle Society." She was, around this time, a friend of Hugh Everett III, of whose theories about parallel universes Poul Anderson later became an enthusiast.

Robert A. Heinlein dedicated his 1982 novel, Friday, in part to Anderson.

The writer Greg Bear was her son-in-law.

== Bibliography ==
=== Novels ===
==== King of Ys ====
1. Roma Mater (1986) with Poul Anderson
2. Gallicenae (1987) with Poul Anderson
3. Dahut (1987) with Poul Anderson
4. The Dog and the Wolf (1988) with Poul Anderson

==== The Last Viking ====
1. The Golden Horn (1980) with Poul Anderson
2. The Road of the Sea Horse (1980) with Poul Anderson
3. The Sign of the Raven (1980) with Poul Anderson

=== Collections ===
- The Unicorn Trade (1984) with Poul Anderson
