= The Queen of Air and Darkness (novella) =

- Short story by Poul Anderson
- Language: English
- Genre: Science fiction

Publication
- Published in: The Magazine of Fantasy and Science Fiction
- Publication date: April 1971
- Publication place: United States

"The Queen of Air and Darkness" is a science fiction novella by American writer Poul Anderson, set in his History of Rustum fictional universe. Originally published in the April 1971 issue of The Magazine of Fantasy and Science Fiction, it won the Hugo Award for Best Novella and the Locus Award for Best Short Story in 1972, and the Nebula Award for Best Novelette in 1971.

== Premise ==
On the frontier colony world, Roland, a distraught mother hires the only private investigator there, Eric Sherrinford, to find her missing son who vanished during an expedition in the hinterlands. The local police are little help in spite of the long series of unexplained child disappearances. Though there have been no confirmed sightings of intelligent native life, and the rumors sound suspiciously like Celtic superstitions from old Earth, Sherrinford believes that an unknown intelligent species is the best explanation of the child's disappearance. So he sets off with the mother into the hinterland to investigate.
