= Dominic Flandry =

Central character in Poul Anderson's Technic History series

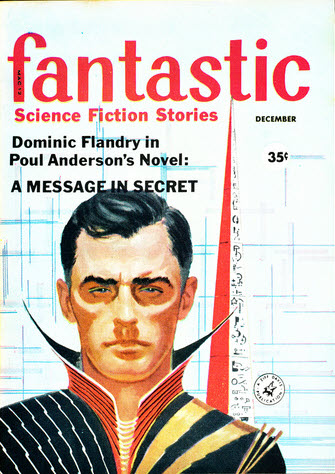
Dominic Flandry, as depicted on the cover of the December 1959 issue of Fantastic by Ed Valigursky.

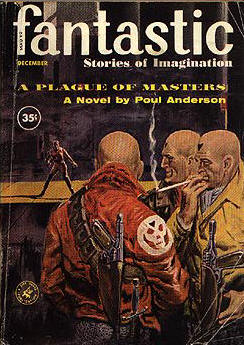
The Flandry short novel A Plague of Masters was the cover story on the December 1960 issue of Fantastic before being published in book form as Earthman Go Home! (Ace double, part of D-479)

Dominic Flandry is a fictional character and the protagonist of the second half of American writer Poul Anderson's Technic History science fiction series. He first appeared in 1951.

The space opera series is set in the 31st century, during the waning days of the Terran Empire. Flandry is a dashing field agent of the Imperial Intelligence Corps who travels the stars to fight off imminent threats to the empire from both external enemies and internal treachery. His long-time archenemy is Aycharaych, a cultured but ruthless telepathic spymaster who weaves plots for the expansionist rival empire of the alien Merseians.

The illegitimate son of a minor nobleman, Flandry rises to power within the Empire by his own wits, and enjoys all the pleasures his position in society gives him. Still he is conscious of the impending fall of the Terran Empire and the subsequent "Long Night" of a galactic dark age. His career is dedicated to holding it off for as long as possible. In time, he passes the mantle to his daughter Diana, who is also illegitimate.

Flandry is willing to disregard conventional morality and use his foes' tactics against them. He can cheerfully deceive, seduce, and blackmail; in A Knight of Ghosts and Shadows, he orders the mind-probing of his traitorous illegitimate son, reducing him to a vegetative state, and bombards Aycharaych's uninhabited homeworld into radioactive ruin in part for vengeance, as Aycharaych's latest plot had resulted in the death of the woman he loved and planned to marry.

== Appearances ==
=== Novels ===
- Ensign Flandry (1966)
- A Circus of Hells (1970)
- The Rebel Worlds (1969)
- A Knight of Ghosts and Shadows (1974)
- A Stone in Heaven (1979)
- The Game of Empire (1985; modeled on Kipling's Kim)
- We Claim These Stars (1959)

=== Collections ===
- Agent of the Terran Empire (1965) consisting of the short stories "Tiger by the Tail" (1951), "The Warriors from Nowhere" (1954), "Honorable Enemies" (1951) and "Hunters of the Sky Cave" (1965).
- Flandry of Terra (1965) containing "The Game of Glory" (1958), "A Message in Secret" (1959) and "The Plague of Masters" (1960/1965).

=== Omnibus editions ===
- Young Flandry (2009), combining the novels Ensign Flandry, A Circus of Hells and The Rebel Worlds.
- Captain Flandry: Defender of the Terran Empire (2010), combining the short stories "Outpost of Empire", "The Day of Their Return", "Tiger by the Tail", "Honorable Enemies", "The Game of Glory" and "A Message in Secret".
- Sir Dominic Flandry: The Last Knight of Terra (2010), combining the short stories "The Plague of Masters", "Hunters of the Sky Cave", "The Warriors from Nowhere" and the novel A Knight of Ghosts and Shadows.
- Flandry's Legacy (2011), combining the novels A Stone in Heaven and The Game of Empire.

=== In other works ===
He also appears – with Anderson's permission – in the novel The Dark Dimensions (1971), part of the John Grimes series written by A. Bertram Chandler. There, Flandry crosses over into Chandler's Rim Worlds and meets Chandler's Commodore Grimes (the two fail to like each other).

"The Day of Their Return" is related to the Flandry saga though he does not appear in it – being a sequel to "The Rebel Worlds" depicting how the planet Aeneas and its inhabitants fared after Flandry ended his mission there and went elsewhere.

== Relationship with women ==
While still a cadet, Flandry seduced the girlfriend of a fellow trainee named Fenross. The girl was not very attractive and Flandry was not particularly smitten with her; in later times he could hardly remember her name ("Majorie or something like that"). After Flandry dropped her, the girl became "very wild" and was killed in an accident on Venus. Fenross, who had cared for her very much, never looked at another woman afterwards and never forgave Flandry. Being promoted faster, Fenross became an admiral and Flandry's direct superior, and kept doing all he could to get Flandry killed. Flandry admitted that Fenross had a legitimate grudge, but did manage to survive all the very dangerous missions on which Fenross kept sending him.

Similar to the James Bond stories (which started two years later), every new adventure brings Flandry another damsel to woo and rescue. The women are of many different backgrounds – Queens and aristocrats as well as slaves and peasants, courtesans, and at least two non-human females; but they all tend to be brave, intelligent and resourceful and to lend help to the success of Flandry's mission. Many of the adventures end with a scene where Flandry, his mission over, departs and leaves behind yet another heartbroken woman, saying things like "It would never work out, better that I leave before a bright memory becomes tarnished" and "I'm just not the forever-and-ever sort, and less than that would be unfair to you, lass" and "I'm as mossless a stone as you'll find in a universe of rolling". Sometimes Flandry warns a woman from the outset that their affair would not last beyond his present mission – which only partly helps; and on some occasions he makes an effort on departure to get the current Flandry Girl settled down with a male of her own planet and social milieu. In one case, Flandry's current lover and partner gets herself and her entire family freed of slavery and settled on a piece of land, a suitable recompense for seeing him depart at the end of his mission.

Djana, the ex-prostitute who shares the young Flandry's illicit treasure-hunt and captivity among the Merseians in A Circus of Hells, had been deeply traumatized in early life and is correspondingly more deeply hurt than others at the termination of their relationship. On departure she leaves Flandry with a curse: "I guess I can't stop you from having nearly any woman who comes by. But I'll wish this, that you never get the one you really want". At the time, Flandry shrugs it off ("Women! The aliens among us") – but Djana's curse comes all too true. In The Rebel Worlds Flandry falls head over heels in love with Kathryn McCormac, wife of the rebel Admiral Hugh McCormac. For once, he does very much want to be "the forever-and-ever sort", and in order to have Kathryn he is even willing to betray his oath to the Empire and join her husband's foredoomed rebellion. But Kathryn – though far from indifferent to Flandry's charms – remains steadfastly loyal to her husband, and eventually chooses to join his exile far outside the Empire's boundaries. In that case it is the heartbroken Flandry who is left behind, reduced to thinking "But she's happy. That's enough".

Also much later in life, a single other occasion when Flandry thought he had found an enduring love ended tragically, through the machinations of Flandry's arch-enemy Aycharaych – much as James Bond's single attempt at finding matrimonial bliss was terminated by Bond's own arch-enemy.

In both cases where Flandry falls deeply in love, it is with a woman who had undergone a deeply traumatic experience: the one having been very brutally raped, the other one kidnapped, sold into slavery and bound for a life of enforced prostitution. In both cases Flandry is highly protective and considerate, making an enormous effort to win the hurt woman's trust, and in both cases his love - though eventually reciprocated - is never consummated.

Only near the end of Flandry's active career is the curse finally lifted and Flandry meets and marries Miriam, the daughter of his old mentor, and attains matrimonial bliss in the waning years of his life. Anderson approaches depicting his female characters as fully realized individulals but doesn't make the transcendent leap probably due to his own concerns about marketability.

== Merseia ==
Merseia is the rival empire confronting Terra, and Flandry's entire career is spent confronting Merseian agents and foiling Merseian plots.

Anderson's depiction of Merseia combines three distinct models. In the repeatedly-made comparisons of the declining Terran Empire with the historical Roman Empire, Merseia clearly stands for the Persian Sassanid Empire, which confronted the Romans for centuries, neither ever able to prevail.

The interrelations of Terra and Merseia are very similar to the Cold War relations of the United States and the Soviet Union. The war by proxy which Terrans and Merseians wage in Ensign Flandry is clearly reminiscent of the Vietnam War, raging at the time of writing, and the division of Terran decision-makers into "Hawks" and "Doves" in their attitude to Mersia obviously mirrors that of actual Americans. Later on, in Game of Empire the Merseians launch an audacious plot to place a Merseian agent on the Terran Imperial throne – reminiscent of The Manchurian Candidate.

In its society and culture, Merseia is clearly modeled on the Empire of Japan during the era of fascism – a society which achieved a high technological level while preserving many of the social conventions and institutions of a feudal past. Merseians' ambivalent attitude to Terra – admiration mixed with intensive rivalry and sometimes hatred – mirrors the Imperial Japanese attitude to the US. Several centuries before Flandry, the well-meant expedition to Merseia by Anderson's earlier character David Falkayn is the rough equivalent of Admiral Perry's opening of Japan to the West in 1854.

However, in this comparison Merseia is a far stronger Imperial Japan – in effect, a Japan which never underwent the defeat of 1945 and the transformation of Japanese society under American occupation, but rather went on to achieve complete parity with the US under a long succession of Tojos.

The three models – Merseians as Sassanids, Merseians as Soviets, and Merseians as fascist Imperial Japanese – are all present in the multi-faceted depiction of Flandry's foes.

== General and cited sources ==
- Poul Anderson's Future Histories, by Dr Paul Shackley
- Dominic Flandry series listing at the Internet Speculative Fiction Database
