= Pirates! =

Pirates! may refer to:

- Sid Meier's Pirates!: a 1987 video game, created by Sid Meier

- Pirates! Gold: a 1993 computer game, a remake of Sid Meier's 1987 release, Sid Meier's Pirates!
- Sid Meier's Pirates! (2004 video game): a 2004 remake of the Sid Meier's video game

- The series of The Pirates! books written by Gideon Defoe
  - The Pirates! in an Adventure with Scientists
  - The Pirates! in an Adventure with Whaling (published in the United States as The Pirates! In an Adventure with Ahab)
  - The Pirates! in an Adventure with Communists
  - The Pirates! in an Adventure with Napoleon
- The Pirates! Band of Misfits, a 2012 animated film based on the books by Gideon Defoe
- Pirates! The Penzance Musical, at 2025 Broadway musical based on The Pirates of Penzance, adapted by Rupert Holmes.

== See also ==
- Pirate (disambiguation)
