= Pirate (disambiguation) =

A pirate is a person who commits acts of piracy at sea without the authorization of any nation.

Pirate(s) may also refer to:

== Arts, entertainment and media ==
=== Fictional characters ===
- Air pirate, a character archetype in science fiction and fantasy
- List of fictional pirates
- Space pirate, a character archetype in science fiction

=== Films ===
- Pirates (1986 film), an adventure/comedy directed by Roman Polanski
- Pirates (2005 film), a pornographic film
- Pirates (2021 film), a British film
- Pirates II: Stagnetti's Revenge (2008), a pornographic film
- Pirates 4-D, a 1999 3-D short attraction film primarily used in theme parks
- The Pirate (1948 film), an American musical
- The Pirate (1973 film), a Hong Kong film
- The Pirate (1978 film), an American TV movie directed by Ken Annakin
- The Pirate (1984 film), a French film
- The Pirates (2014 film), a South Korean period/adventure film
- The Pirates! In an Adventure with Scientists! (2012), a British/American 3D stop-motion animated swashbuckler comedy
- The Pirate Movie (1982), an Australian musical based on The Pirates of Penzance

=== Games and toys ===
- Lego Pirates, a Lego theme launched in 1989
- Pirate game, a puzzle of logic and mathematics
- Pirates Constructible Strategy Game, a tabletop game
- Pirates: Captain's Quest, 1997 educational adventure video game published by Discovery Channel Multimedia
- Pirates: Duels on the High Seas, a 2008 Nintendo DS video game
- Pirates: The Key of Dreams, a 2008 Wii video game
- Pirates: The Legend of Black Kat, a 2002 video game
- Pirates: Tides of Fortune, a 2012 video game
- Pop-up Pirate, a children's game in which a pirate is forced to exit a barrel through simulated torture
- Sid Meier's Pirates!, a 1987 video game
  - Pirates! Gold, a 1993 remake of the 1987 game
  - Sid Meier's Pirates! (2004 video game), a 2004 remake of the 1987 game

=== Music ===
- "Pirate" (Cher song), from the album Cherished
- Pirates (Rickie Lee Jones album), 1981
- Pirates (Visions of Atlantis album), 2022
- Johnny Kidd & the Pirates, a British rock and roll group
- "Pirate", a song by Everglow
- "Pirates", a song by Emerson, Lake & Palmer on Works Volume 1
- "Pirates", a song by Jolin Tsai on Castle
- "Pirates", a song by Caravan Palace on Panic
- The Pirates (opera), by Stephen Storace
- The Pirates of Penzance, comic opera by Gilbert and Sullivan

=== Literature ===
- The Pirate (German: Der Seeräuber), a 1912 play by Ludwig Fulda and the basis of Behrman's play
- The Pirate (novel), 1821, by Sir Walter Scott
- The Pirate, an 1836 novel by Frederick Marryat
- Pirates, a 1929 novel by H. Taprell Dorling, under the pen name Taffrail
- The Pirate, a 1942 play by S. N. Behrman
- "The Pirate" (short story), a 1968 science fiction story by Poul Anderson
- The Pirate, a 1974 novel by Harold Robbins
- The Pirate, a 1985 novel by Barry Sadler, the fifteenth installment in the Casca series
- The Pirate, a 1990 novel by Jayne Ann Krentz, the first installment in the Ladies and Legends trilogy
- Pirate, a 1993 novel by Fabio Lanzoni
- Pirates, a 1995 novel by Linda Lael Miller
- Pirate, a 2005 novel by Ted Bell, the third installment in the Alexander Hawke series
- Pirate, a 2006 novel by Mike Resnick, the second installment in the Starship series
- Pirates, a 2009 non-fiction book by Ross Kemp
- "Pirate", a 2011 short story by Walter Dean Myers
- Pirate, a 2012 novel by Duncan Falconer, the seventh installment in the John Stratton series

=== Television ===
- "Pirate", Big Cook, Little Cook, series 2, series 12 (2004)
- "Pirate", Larva Island season 1, episode 12 (2018)
- "Pirate", Mr Benn episode 13 (1972)
- "Pirate", Tugs episode 2 (1989)
- "Pirates", Bert and Ernie's Great Adventures season 1, episode 2 (2008)
- "Pirates", Big Babies episode 2 (2010)
- "Pirates" (Bluey), an episode of Bluey
- "Pirates", Cleopatra in Space season 3, episode 4 (2021)
- "Pirates", Dani's House season 1, episode 1 (2008)
- "Pirates", E.N.G. season 3, episode 7 (1991)
- "Pirates", Explained season 2, episode 6 (2019)
- "Pirates", Gavilan episode 2 (1982)
- "Pirates", Kate & Allie season 2, episode 8 (1984)
- "Pirates", Kipper series 4, episode 3 (1999)
- "Pirates", MacGyver (1985 TV series) season 2, episode 15 (1987)
- "Pirates", NCIS: Hawaiʻi season 1, episode 15 (2022)
- "Pirates", Rainbow series 12, episode 17 (1983)
- "Pirates", Skatoony season 1, episode 4 (2018)
- "Pirates", Teen Titans Go! season 2, episode 3 (2014)
- "Pirates", The Good Night Show season 7, episode 3 (2016)
- "Pirates", The Most Extreme season 4, episode 17 (2006)
- "Pirates", Ultimate Cake Off season 1, episode 2 (2009)
- "Pirates", Waterfront Beat series 2, episode 1 (1991)
- "The Pirates", Galactik Football season 1, episode 10 (2006)
- "The Pirates", Huckleberry Finn and His Friends episode 5 (1979)
- "The Pirates", Roger Ramjet season 1, episode 12 (1965)
- "The Pirates", Sea Princesses season 2, episode 12 (2013)
- "The Pirates", The Adventures of Sir Lancelot episode 7 (1956)
- "The Pirates", The Herculoids episode 1a (1967)
- "Chapter 21: The Pirate", an episode of The Mandalorian

== People ==
- List of pirates
- Marco Pantani, professional cyclist nicknamed "Il Pirata" (The Pirate)

== Ships ==
- Pirate (dinghy), a type of sailing boat
- Pirate (steamboat), 1839
- USS Pirate, any of several U.S. Navy ships bearing the name
- Pirate, an R-class sloop and landmark in South Lake Union, Seattle

== Sports ==
=== United Kingdom ===
- Bristol Rovers F.C., a football team, nicknamed the Pirates
- Cornish Pirates, a rugby team
- Croydon Pirates, a baseball team
- East Kilbride Pirates, an American football team
- Essex Pirates, a basketball team
- Poole Pirates, a motorcycle speedway team

=== United States ===
- East Carolina Pirates, the sports teams of East Carolina University
- Hampton Pirates, the sports teams of Hampton University
- Pittsburgh Pirates (NHL), a hockey team existing from 1925 to 1930
- Pittsburgh Pirates, a Major League Baseball team
- Pittsburgh Steelers, an NFL football team, known as the Pittsburgh Pirates from 1933 to 1939
- Portland Pirates, a minor league hockey team
- Seton Hall Pirates, the sports teams of Seton Hall University

=== Other countries ===
- Lyceum Pirates, NCAA Philippines team of Lyceum of the Philippines University
- Nishi Nippon Pirates, a former professional Japanese baseball team
- Orlando Pirates FC, a South African football team
- Pirate City Rollers, a Roller Derby team from Auckland, New Zealand
- Port Adelaide Pirates, unofficial name of Port Adelaide Soccer Club, South Australia
- Picton Pirates, a Canadian junior ice hockey team

== Other uses ==
- Pirate (butterfly), Catacroptera cloanthe
- Pirate (sexual slang)
- Pirate Party, various political parties around the world
- EuroFIRST PIRATE (Passive Infra-Red Airborne Track Equipment), a tracking system for the Eurofighter Typhoon aircraft
- Vought F6U Pirate, an American jet fighter

== See also ==
- Anti-piracy (disambiguation)
- Patent pirate (disambiguation)
- Piracy (disambiguation)
- Pirates! (disambiguation)
- Pyrates (disambiguation)
