= Skyjacked =

Skyjacked may refer to:

- Aircraft hijacking
- Skyjacked (film), 1972 U.S. film
- Skyjacked (TV episode) a 2017 animated short from the series Justice League Action, see List of Justice League Action episodes

== See also ==
- Skyjacker (disambiguation)
- Skyjack (disambiguation)
- sky (disambiguation)
- Air pirate (disambiguation)
- Sky pirate (disambiguation)
- Hijacking
