= Skyjack (disambiguation) =

Skyjack or variation may refer to:

- A skyjack, an incidence of aircraft hijacking
- SkyJack, a UAV drone
- Sky Jack, a thoroughbred racehorse
- Skyjack (Transformers), a fictional robot
- Skyjacks, a fictional group from the Revelation Space fictional universe
- Skyjack, a brand name for a scissor lift

== See also ==
- Skyjacker (disambiguation)
- Skyjacked (disambiguation)
- Sky (disambiguation)
- Jack (disambiguation)
- Air pirate (disambiguation)
- Sky pirate (disambiguation)
- Hijacking
