= Hijacked =

Hijacked may refer to:

- related to hijacking (disambiguation)

== Film ==
- Hi-Jacked, a 1950 American crime film noir
- Hijacked, a 2012 action crime thriller film starring Vinnie Jones, Rob Steinberg, and Craig Fairbrass
- Hijacked (film), a 2025 Vietnamese film

== Literature ==
- Hijacked, a 1970 by Edwin Corley, written as David Harper; basis for the 1972 film Skyjacked
- Hijacked: The True Story of the Heroes of Flight 705, a 1997 book by Dave Hirschman concerning the attempted hijacking of a FedEx DC-10 cargo jet

== Television ==
- "Hi-jacked" (Joe 90), a 1968 episode of Joe 90
- "Hijacked", a 2004 episode of 72 Hours: True Crime
- "Hijacked", a 2006 episode of American Experience season 18
- "Hijacked", a 2012 episode of Arctic Air
- "Hijacked", a 1997 episode of Baywatch
- "Hijacked", a 1990 episode of Danger Bay
- "Hijacked", a 1959 episode of Mr. Lucky

== See also ==
- Hijack (disambiguation)
