= List of shipwrecks in April 1839 =

The list of shipwrecks in April 1839 includes ships sunk, foundered, wrecked, grounded, or otherwise lost during April 1839.

== 1 April ==
List of shipwrecks: 1 April 1839
Ship	State	Description
Pearl	United States	The ship was driven ashore at Ocracoke, North Carolina. She was on a voyage from New York to "Newburn".
Richard Jane Ann	United Kingdom	The ship departed from Fowey, Cornwall for Campbeltown, Argyllshire. No further trace, presumed foundered with the loss of all hands.

=== 3 April ===
List of shipwrecks: April 1839
Ship	State	Description
Ellen	United Kingdom	The ship was driven ashore.
Gateshead Park	United Kingdom	The ship was driven ashore 4 nautical miles (7.4 km) east of Marsala, Sicily. Her crew were rescued. She was on a voyage from Odesa to Cork.
Victoria	United Kingdom	The ship was driven ashore at Cape Feto, Sicily. Her crew were rescued. She was on a voyage from Smyrna, Ottoman Empire to Liverpool, Lancashire.
Vrow Gesina	Kingdom of Hanover	The ship was driven ashore and wrecked south of Scarborough, Yorkshire, United Kingdom. Her crew were rescued. She was on a voyage from Leer to Hull, Yorkshire.
Vrow Antje	Kingdom of Hanover	The ship was driven ashore and wrecked at Bridlington, Yorkshire. She was on a voyage from Norden to Hull.
William and Thomas	United Kingdom	The ship was driven ashore on Walney Island, Lancashire. She was on a voyage from Liverpool to Ulverston.

== 4 April ==
List of shipwrecks: 4 April 1839
Ship	State	Description
Betsey	France	The ship was abandoned in the Atlantic Ocean. Her crew were rescued by Molly (Hamburg).
Darling	United Kingdom	The ship was driven ashore at Beaumaris, Anglesey. She was on a voyage from Bangor to Liverpool, Lancashire.
Hooton	United Kingdom	The ship was driven ashore at Balbriggan, County Dublin. Her crew were rescued. She was on a voyage from Whitehaven, Cumberland to Cardiff, Glamorgan. Hooton was refloated on 4 May and towed into Drogheda, County Louth.
Laura	United Kingdom	The smack foundered off Mullion Island, Cornwall. Her crew were rescued. She was on a voyage from Port Madoc, Caernarfonshire to King's Lynn, Norfolk.
Penrice Castle	United Kingdom	The schooner foundered off Mullion Island. Her crew survived. She was on a voyage from Swansea, Glamorgan to Falmouth, Cornwall.
William and Catherine	United Kingdom	The schooner was driven ashore and wrecked in Mounts Bay. Her crew survived.

== 5 April ==
List of shipwrecks: 5 April 1839
Ship	State	Description
Bravo	United Kingdom	The ship was driven ashore at "Rossiter", Prussia. She was on a voyage from Plymouth, Devon to Memel, Prussia. She was refloated on 16 April and taken into Memel.
Dunmore	United Kingdom	The sloop sprang a leak and foundered off Bo'ness, Lothian with the loss of two of her crew.
Patriot	United Kingdom	The ship was driven ashore in the Cumbrae Islands, Ayrshire.
Retrench	United Kingdom	The brig was wrecked at the Cumbrae Lighthouse, Ayrshire. Her crew and 45 passengers were rescued. She was on a voyage from Glasgow, Renfrewshire to New York.

== 6 April ==
List of shipwrecks: 6 April 1839
Ship	State	Description
Brave	United Kingdom	The ship was driven ashore at Rossiten, Prussia. She was on a voyage from Plymouth, Devon to Memel, Prussia.
Emerald	United Kingdom	The ship was driven onto rocks near "Green Island". She was on a voyage from Constantinople, Ottoman Empire to London. Emerald was refloated on 8 April and resumed her voyage.
Leila	United States	The ship was driven ashore at Sewell's Point, Virginia. She was on a voyage from Liverpool, Lancashire, United Kingdom to Baltimore, Maryland. Leila was later refloated and taken into Baltimore.
Matthew	United Kingdom	The ship was driven ashore at Le Tréport, Seine-Inférieure, France. She was on a voyage from Newcastle upon Tyne, Northumberland to Trieste. Matthew was refloated on 12 April.

== 7 April ==
List of shipwrecks: 7 April 1839
Ship	State	Description
Emerald	United Kingdom	The ship was driven ashore at Algeciras, Spain.

== 8 April ==
List of shipwrecks: 8 April 1839
Ship	State	Description
Bergetha	Norway	The ship sprang a leak and was beached at Grimsby, Lincolnshire, United Kingdom. She was on a voyage from Porsgrund to Fécamp, Seine-Inférieure, France. Bergetha was refloated on 14 April and taken into Grimsby for repairs.
Berwick-upon-Tweed	United Kingdom	The ship was wrecked in the Black Sea near "Carabourna". Her crew were rescued. She was on a voyage from Odesa to Falmouth, Cornwall.
Emerald	United Kingdom	The ship was wrecked on a rock near Letterkenny, County Donegal. She was on a voyage from Bangor to Letterkenny.
Onderneming	Kingdom of Hanover	The ship was wrecked on Brouwer's Bank, in the North Sea. Her crew were rescued. She was on a voyage from Ditzum to London, United Kingdom or Antwerp, Belgium.

== 9 April ==
List of shipwrecks: 9 April 1839
Ship	State	Description
Aid	United Kingdom	The ship foundered in the North Sea off Scarborough, Yorkshire. Her crew survived.
Emerald	United States	The ship was driven ashore in the Mississippi River downstream of New Orleans, Louisiana.
Frederic Wilhelm	Hamburg	The steamship was destroyed by fire in the Elbe at Sandau, Prussia. All on board were rescued. She was on a voyage from Hamburg to Magdeburg, Prussia.
Kingston	United Kingdom	The ship foundered in the Atlantic Ocean. All on board were rescued by Thomas (United Kingdom). Kingston was on a voyage from Bristol, Gloucestershire to New York, United States. Pusey Hall also took on to Quebec six passengers from Kingston.

== 10 April ==
List of shipwrecks: 10 April 1839
Ship	State	Description
Adler	Bremen	The ship was driven ashore at Calais, France. She was on a voyage from Bremen to Baltimore, Maryland, United States. Adler was refloated on 27 April and taken into Calais.
Hampden	United Kingdom	The ship was driven ashore at Dundee, Forfarshire. She was on a voyage from Dundee to Quebec City, Lower Canada, British North America. Hampden was later refloated and resumed her voyage.

== 11 April ==
List of shipwrecks: 11 April 1839
Ship	State	Description
Demerara	United Kingdom	The ship struck the Mugglin Rock, off Kingstown, County Dublin. She was on a voyage from Dublin to Demerara, British Honduras. Demerara was refloated and towed into Dublin. She resumed her voyage on 17 April.
Deux Sœurs	France	The ship was wrecked near Dénia, Spain. Her crew were rescued.
Felicité	France	The ship was wrecked near Dénia. Her crew were rescued.
Ganges	United Kingdom	The ship ran aground on Paterson's Rock and was severely damaged. She was on a voyage from Glasgow, Renfrewshire to Dalhousie, New Brunswick, British North America. Ganges was refloated and put back to the Clyde.
Stuforster	Flag unknown	The ship was wrecked near Cartagena, Spain. She was on a voyage from Marseille, Bouches-du-Rhône, France to Cádiz, Spain.

== 12 April ==
List of shipwrecks: 12 April 1839
Ship	State	Description
Active	France	The ship was driven ashore near Bône, French Algeria.
Adele et Sophia	Grand Duchy of Tuscany	The ship was driven ashore near Bône.
Alberigo	Grand Duchy of Tuscany	The ship was driven ashore near Bône.
Ariel	United Kingdom	The ship was driven ashore near Brouwershaven, Zeeland, Netherlands, She was on a voyage from Newcastle upon Tyne, Northumberland to Rotterdam, South Holland, Netherlands.
Bonne Valaurienne	France	The ship was driven ashore near Bône.
Brothers	United Kingdom	The ship ran aground on Scroby Sands, Norfolk and was damaged. She was on a voyage from Newcastle upon Tyne to Constantinople, Ottoman Empire. Brothers was refloated and put into Harwich, Essex.
Celestin	France	The ship was wrecked on the Goodwin Sands, Kent, United Kingdom. Her crew were rescued. She was on a voyage from Newcastle upon Tyne to Marseille, Bouches-du-Rhône.
Charlotte	Grand Duchy of Tuscany	The ship was driven ashore near Bône.
Emerald	United Kingdom	The ship was sunk by ice. Her crew were rescued. She was on a voyage from Bideford, Devon to Boston, Massachusetts, United States.
Friend's Adventure	United Kingdom	The ship ran aground at Sunderland, County Durham and was damaged. She put into Hartlepool where she was beached.
Jeune Ezelia	France	The ship was driven ashore near Bône.
Leonidas	Kingdom of Sardinia	The ship was driven ashore near Bône.
Nina	Austrian Empire	The ship was driven ashore near Bône.
Nostra Signora del Carmene	Kingdom of Sardinia	The ship was driven ashore near Bône.
Pheasant	United Kingdom	The ship was driven ashore at "Ballahach", County Waterford. She was refloated the next day.
Soleil	France	The ship was driven ashore near Bône.
Vere Amial	Kingdom of Sardinia	The ship was driven ashore near Bône.
Victoire	France	The ship was driven ashore near Bône.

== 13 April ==
List of shipwrecks: 13 April 1839
Ship	State	Description
Blucher	United Kingdom	The ship was driven ashore at Holyhead, Anglesey. She was on a voyage from Troon, Ayrshire to Holyhead. Blucher was refloated and taken into Holyhead.
Favourite	United Kingdom	The ship ran aground on the Horeshoe Reef. She was on a voyage from Alexandria, Egypt to Barbados. Favourite was refloated and resumed her voyage.

== 14 April ==
List of shipwrecks: 14 April 1839
Ship	State	Description
Ann Scott	United Kingdom	The brig was wrecked on Eierland, North Holland, Netherlands with the loss of at least six lives. She was on a voyage from Sunderland, County Durham to Amsterdam, North Holland.
Auguste Eugene	United Kingdom	The ship ran aground on the Goodwin Sands, Kent. She was later refloated.
Constantia	United States	The ship was driven ashore between Brewster and Wellfleet, Massachusetts. She was on a voyage from Havana, Cuba to Portsmouth, New Hampshire .
Louisa	United Kingdom	The ship departed from Nyborg, Denmark for Liverpool, Lancashire. No further trace, presumed foundered with the loss of all hands.
United Kingdom	United Kingdom	The ship ran aground on the Gunfleet Sand, in the North Sea off the coast of Essex. She was on a voyage from Sunderland to London. United Kingdom was refloated and resumed her voyage.

== 15 April ==
List of shipwrecks: April 1839
Ship	State	Description
Albion	United Kingdom	The ship was run down and sunk off the Casquets by Couton (France). Her crew were rescued by Couton. Albion was on a voyage from Saint Sampson, Guernsey, Channel Islands to London.
Assistance	United Kingdom	The ship ran aground on a reef in Black Island Bay, County Mayo and was wrecked. She was on a voyage from Liverpool, Lancashire to Westport, County Mayo.

== 16 April ==
List of shipwrecks: 16 April 1839
Ship	State	Description
Fru Marie	Denmark	The ship was driven ashore and sank at Grenå.
Hannah	United Kingdom	The ship ran aground on the Middle Sand, in the North Sea off the coast of Lincolnshire. She capsized and sank. Her crew were rescued. Hannah was on a voyage from Thorne to London.
Johanna	(Denmark) Duchy of Schleswig	The ship was driven ashore at Grenå.
Thomas	United Kingdom	The ship was wrecked on North Ronaldsay, Orkney Islands. Her four crew were rescued. She was on a voyage from Lerwick, Shetland Islands to Leith, Lothian.

== 17 April ==
List of shipwrecks: 17 April 1839
Ship	State	Description
Arethusa	United Kingdom	The ship was driven ashore and wrecked at Helsingør, Denmark. Her crew were rescued. She was on a voyage from Greifswald to Leith, Lothian.
Fortitude	United Kingdom	The ship was run down in the North Sea off the coast of Norfolk by Royal Victoria (United Kingdom). Her crew were rescued by Royal Victoria. Fortitude was on a voyage from London to Stockton on Tees, County Durham. Fortitude was towed into Dunkirk, Nord, France on 21 April.
Frau Mina	Hamburg	The ship foundered off Belle Île, Morbihan, France with the loss of a crew member. She was on a voyage from Hamburg to Nantes, Loire Atlantique.
Minerva	United Kingdom	The ship ran aground at King's Lynn, Norfolk. She was on a voyage from Hartlepool, County Durham to King's Lynn. Minerva was refloated.
Union	(United Kingdom of Great Britain and Ireland) Guernsey	The ship ran aground and was severely damaged at Saint Sampson. She was later refloated and taken into Saint Sampson.
William	United Kingdom	The ship was driven ashore 2 nautical miles (3.7 km) east of Calais, France. She was on a voyage from Leith to Dunkirk, Nord, France.

== 18 April ==
List of shipwrecks: 18 April 1839
Ship	State	Description
Athalides	United Kingdom	The ship struck sunken rocks and sank off "Neuhellesund" with the loss of two lives. She was on a voyage from Leith, Lothian to Wolgast, Prussia.
Earl of Durham	United Kingdom	The ship ran aground on the Colleach Rocks, in Loch Alsh. she was on a voyage from Liverpool, Lancashire to Riga, Russia. She was refloated on 25 April and beached at Kyle of Lochalsh, Inverness-shire.
Elizabeth and Jane	United Kingdom	The ship was driven ashore at Sunderland, County Durham. /she was on a voyage from Portsmouth, Hampshire to Sunderland. Elizabeth and Jane was refloated and take into Sunderland.
Fairfield	United Kingdom	The barque was wrecked on the Troubridge Shoals. All on board were rescued. She was on a voyage from Liverpool to Port Adelaide, South Australia.
Flora	United Kingdom	The ship was driven ashore near Sunderland. She was later refloated and taken into the port.
Lord Wellington	United Kingdom	The ship struck the Cross Sand, in the North Sea off the coast of Norfolk and sank.

== 19 April ==
List of shipwrecks: 19 April 1839
Ship	State	Description
Esseri Tigiaret, or Orient	Ottoman Empire	The steamship was wrecked off Samsoun. She was on a voyage from the Trebizond Eyalet to Constantinople. Orient was later refloated, repaired and returned to service.
Grindon	United Kingdom	The ship ran aground on the Kentish Knock. She was refloated and put into Sheerness, Kent, where she was driven ashore before being refloated and taken into port.
Jantina	Netherlands	The ship was wrecked on "Listerland". She was on a voyage from Termunterzijl, Groningen to a Norwegian port.
Jonge Dirk	Netherlands	The ship was wrecked on "Listerland". She was on a voyage from Harlingen, Friesland to Christiansand, Norway.
Louis Charles Marie	United Kingdom	The chasse-marée struck rocks and sank at Alderney, Channel Islands. Her four crew survived. She was on a voyage from Bayonne, Basses-Pyrénées to Rouen, Seine-Inférieure.

== 20 April ==
List of shipwrecks: 20 April 1839
Ship	State	Description
Ann	United Kingdom	The ship ran aground 2 nautical miles (3.7 km) from King's Lynn, Norfolk. She was on a voyage from Hartlepool, County Durham to King's Lynn.
Catherine	United Kingdom	The ship was wrecked on the West Rocks, Harwich, Essex. Three crew were rescued. She was on a voyage from King's Lynn, Norfolk to London. Catherine was refloated on 5 May and towed into Harwich.
Clarisse	France	The ship sprang a leak and was beached at the mouth of the Lannion. She was on a voyage from Granville, Manche to Martinique.
James McInroy	United Kingdom	The ship was wrecked on a reef in the Maldive Islands. Her crew were rescued. She was on a voyage from Calcutta, India to the Clyde.
Zeluna	France	The ship was driven ashore between Adra and Almería, Spain. she was on a voyage from Nantes, Loire Atlantique to Marseille, Bouches-du-Rhône.

== 21 April ==
List of shipwrecks: 21 April 1839
Ship	State	Description
Jane	United Kingdom	The ship was driven ashore and wrecked on Anholt, Denmark. Her crew were rescued. She was on a voyage from Newcastle upon Tyne, Northumberland to Stettin.
Seal	United Kingdom	The ship was driven ashore near Cádiz, Spain. She was refloated the next day.

=== 22 April ===
List of shipwrecks: 22 April 1839
Ship	State	Description
Artémise	French Navy	The Artémise-class frigate ran aground off "Ono Wia", Tahiti and was damaged. She was refloated with assistance from Champion (United States) and taken into "Pape Viti".

== 23 April ==
List of shipwrecks: 23 April 1839
Ship	State	Description
Hercules	United Kingdom	The ship ran aground at King's Lynn, Norfolk. She was on a voyage from Newcastle upon Tyne, Northumberland to King's Lynn. Hercules was refloated the next day.
Horatio	United Kingdom	The ship was driven ashore near St. Bees Head, Cumberland. She was on a voyage from Sierra Leone to Workington, Cumberland. Horatio was later refloated.
Leeds	United Kingdom	The ship was run aground at Whitburn, County Durham. She was later refloated and put into Newcastle upon Tyne, Northumberland.
Richard and Thomas	United Kingdom	The ship sprang a leak and foundered in the Dogger Bank. Her crew were rescued. She was on a voyage from Newcastle upon Tyne to a Dutch port.
Six H's to the Queen	United Kingdom	The ship was driven ashore at Warham, Norfolk. She was on a voyage from Wisbech, Cambridgeshire to London. Six H's to the Queen was later refloated and taken into Wells-next-the-Sea, Norfolk.

== 24 April ==
List of shipwrecks: 24 April 1839
Ship	State	Description
Diamond	United Kingdom	The ship capsized at Galway.
Leeds	United Kingdom	The ship was driven ashore at Whitburn, County Durham. She was on a voyage from Whitby, Yorkshire to Newcastle upon Tyne, Northumberland. Leeds was later refloated.
Mathilde	United Kingdom	The ship was driven ashore near Hjørring, Denmark. Her crew were rescued. She was on a voyage from Newcastle upon Tyne, Northumberland to Frederikshavn, Denmark.
Red Rover	United Kingdom	The ship was driven ashore and wrecked in the Cape Verde Islands. All on board were rescued. She was on a voyage from London to Sydney, New South Wales.
Richard and Thomas	United Kingdom	The ship sprang a leak and foundered in the North Sea off Camperduin, North Holland, Netherlands. Her crew were rescued. She was on a voyage from Newcastle upon Tyne to Amsterdam, North Holland.

== 25 April ==
List of shipwrecks: 25 April 1839
Ship	State	Description
Agenoria	Netherlands	The brig was wrecked by ice in the Gulf of Riga. Her crew survived.
Argo	Netherlands	The brig was wrecked by ice in the Gulf of Riga. Her crew survived.
Deptford	United Kingdom	The ship was sunk by ice in the Gulf of Riga. Her crew survived.
Duke of Richmond	United Kingdom	The brig was sunk by ice in the Gulf of Riga. Her crew survived.
Industrie	Lübeck	The ship departed from Riga, Russia for Lübeck. She was subsequently lost, but her crew were rescued.
Orlando	United Kingdom	The brig was sunk by ice in the Gulf of Riga. Her crew survived.
Pacific	United Kingdom	The ship was sunk by ice in the Gulf of Riga. Her crew survived.
Regina	United Kingdom	The brig was sunk by ice in the Gulf of Riga. Her crew survived.
Wave	United Kingdom	The ship was sunk by ice in the Gulf of Riga. Her crew survived.

== 26 April ==
List of shipwrecks: 27 April 1839
Ship	State	Description
Denmark Hill	(United Kingdom of Great Britain and Ireland) New South Wales	The ship, which had sprung a leak following a recent capsize at Newcastle, was beached in Broken Bay. Her crew were rescued by Sophia Jane ( (United Kingdom of Great Britain and Ireland) New South Wales).

== 27 April ==
List of shipwrecks: 27 April 1839
Ship	State	Description
Aurora	United Kingdom	The ship was driven ashore and wrecked near Kiapora, New Zealand. Her crew survived.
Marmion	United Kingdom	The schooner, in tow of steam tug Rollon (France) on the river Seine, approaching Quillebeuf-sur-Seine, Eure, struck the bank. The tow-rope broke, she capsized and then sank. Her crew were rescued by the tug. Marmion was on a voyage from Newcastle upon Tyne, Northumberland to Rouen with coal.
Moira	United Kingdom	The ship ran aground in the Hooghly River and was damaged. she was refloated and towed back to Calcutta, India.
Montreal	United Kingdom	The ship was driven ashore on Bornholm, Denmark. She was on a voyage from Hull, Yorkshire to Riga, Russia. Montreal was later refloated.

== 28 April ==
List of shipwrecks: 28 April 1839
Ship	State	Description
Petersburg	United Kingdom	The ship ran aground on the Buka Reef, off Halse, Norway. She was on a voyage from Liverpool, Lancashire to Riga, Russia. She was later refloated.
Queen Adelaide	United Kingdom	The ship departed from Port Royal for Old Harbour, Jamaica. She subsequently capsized. Her crew were rescued.

== 30 April ==
List of shipwrecks: 30 April 1839
Ship	State	Description
Mermaid	United Kingdom	The steamship ran aground on the Swash, in the Bristol Channel. She was on a voyage from Bristol, Gloucestershire to Waterford.

== Unknown date ==
List of shipwrecks: Unknown date in April 1839
Ship	State	Description
Ann	(United Kingdom of Great Britain and Ireland) New South Wales	The schooner ran aground at the mouth of the Macleay River and was wrecked.
Britannia	United Kingdom	The ship was wrecked 12 nautical miles (22 km) east of Port Phillip, New South Wales. She was on a voyage from Launceston, Van Diemen's Land to Port Phillip.
Cherub	United States	The ship was driven ashore on the American coast before 19 April. She was on a voyage from Boston, Massachusetts, to Malta. Cherub was later refloated and put back to Boston.
Ebenezer	France	The ship was driven ashore and severely damaged at the mouth of the Orne before 15 April. She was on a voyage from Christiansand, Norway to Caen, Calvados.
Favourite	United Kingdom	The ship was driven ashore at Wells-next-the-Sea, Norfolk before 14 April. She was on a voyage from London to Sunderland, County Durham. Favourite was refloated on 14 April and taken into Wells-next-the-Sea.
Fenwick	(United Kingdom of Great Britain and Ireland) British North America	The ship was abandoned in the Atlantic Ocean on or before 8 April.
Forester	United Kingdom	The ship was driven ashore near Dragør, Denmark. She was on a voyage from Memel, Kingdom of Prussia to Bristol, Gloucestershire. Forester was later refloated and taken into Helsingør, Denmark, where she arrived on 3 May.
Hoop of Fortune	Netherlands	The ship was abandoned off Marstrand, Sweden before 13 April.
Joseph Wallace	United Kingdom	The ship foundered in the Mediterranean Sea between 9 and 21 April. She was on a voyage from Smyrna, Ottoman Empire to London.
Martha	United Kingdom	The ship was driven ashore and damaged near Venice, Kingdom of Lombardy–Venetia. She was refloated on 18 April and taken into Venice.
Niger	United Kingdom	The ship was wrecked in Annatto Bay, Jamaica.
Phantom	United Kingdom	The ship ran aground off Gallipoli, Ottoman Empire. She was on a voyage from Liverpool, Lancashire to Constantinople, Ottoman Empire. Phantom was later refloated and taken into Constantinople.
Pirate	United States	The steamboat sank in the Missouri River near Bellevue, Nebraska.
Prince Leopold	United Kingdom	The ship was driven ashore near Dungarvan, County Waterford. She was on a voyage from Whitehaven, Cumberland to Cardiff, Glamorgan.
USS Sea Gull	United States Navy	United States Exploring Expedition: The 110 ton 2-gun schooner, a former pilot boat, was lost off Cape Horn She was last seen by USS Flying Fish sheltering in the lee of Staten Island, near Cape Horn, at Midnight on 28 April. There was no sign of her when the gale ended on 1 May. lost with all 15 hands.
St. Pierre	Kingdom of the Two Sicilies	The brig collided with Deux Augustes (France) and foundered. All on board were rescued. She was on a voyage from Syracuse, Sicily to Malta.
United Kingdom	United Kingdom	The ship ran aground on the Goodwin Sands, Kent. She was on a voyage from Newcastle upon Tyne, Northumberland to Dartmouth, Devon. United Kingdom was refloated and put into Ramsgate, Kent.
