= Captain Bellamy =

Captain Bellamy may refer to:

== Piracy ==
- Pirate Captain Samuel Bellamy (1689–1717), notorious pirate from the 18th century.
- Captain Charles Bellamy, another pirate captain from the 18th century.

== In fiction ==
- James Bellamy (Upstairs, Downstairs), a character from Upstairs Downstairs
- A character from The Pirates! in an Adventure with Scientists
- A minor character from Pirates of the Caribbean: Dead Man's Chest
