= Sky Pirate =

A sky pirate is a speculative fiction stock character who conducts piracy from an aircraft or airship. Sky Pirate may also refer to:

== Aviation ==
- A person that carries out a skyjack, the hijacking of an aircraft
- Douglas XTB2D Skypirate, an experimental military aircraft

== Novels ==
- The Sky Pirate (novel), a novel by Garrett P. Serviss published in 1909 in the periodical Scrapbook
- Sky Pirates!, a 1995 novel written by Dave Stone and based on the television series Doctor Who
- Sky Pirates of Callisto, a 1973 novel written by Lin Carter, the third in his Callisto series
- The Last of the Sky Pirates, a 2002 novel by Paul Stewart and Chris Riddell, the fifth volume of The Edge Chronicles and the first of the Rook Saga trilogy

== Film ==
- The Sky Pirate (film), a 1914 American short comedy film directed by and starring Roscoe "Fatty" Arbuckle
- Sky Pirates, a 1986 Australian adventure film written and produced by John D. Lamond, and directed by Colin Eggleston, also titled Dakota Harris

== Music ==
- Sky Pirates: Original Soundtrack Recording (1989 album), soundtrack album to the 1986 film
- Skypirate (1998 song), hiphop song by Sonic Sum

== Other uses ==
- The Sky Pirate, a DC Comics villain and enemy of the Green Lantern, who first appeared in the 1947 comic Green Lantern Vol 1 #27
- The Sky Pirates (Ninjago), fictional characters in Ninjago
- The Sky Pirates, the Japanese professional wrestling tag team of Kairi Sane and Iyo Sky
- space pirate

== See also ==
- Air pirate (disambiguation)
- Pirate (disambiguation)
- Sky (disambiguation)
- Sky Bandits (disambiguation)
- Skyjacker (disambiguation)
- Space Pirate (disambiguation)
- Skyjacked (disambiguation)
- Skyjack (disambiguation)
