= The Pirates! in an Adventure with Napoleon =

Fourth pirate novel by Gideon Defoe

- Cover art for the Hardback edition
- Author: Gideon Defoe with Richard Murkin
- Illustrator: Dave Senior
- Language: English
- Series: The Pirates!
- Genre: Comedy
- Publisher: Orion Books
- Publication date: 8 May 2009
- Publication place: United Kingdom
- Media type: Print (Hardcover)
- Pages: 171 pp
- ISBN: 978-0-297-85108-0
- OCLC: 191243096
- Preceded by: The Pirates! in an Adventure with Communists
- Followed by: The Pirates! in an Adventure with the Romantics

The Pirates! In an Adventure with Napoleon is the fourth novel in Gideon Defoe's The Pirates! series. It was released in May 2009.

Here the Pirate Captain quits pirating, after losing the Pirate of the Year award, to become a bee keeper on St. Helena (another cruel Black Bellamy trick.)

It comes after the books The Pirates! in an Adventure with Scientists, The Pirates! in an Adventure with Whaling (published in the U.S. as The Pirates! In an Adventure with Ahab), and The Pirates! in an Adventure with Communists.
