= Hijacker =

Hijacker may refer to:

- one engaged in hijacking (disambiguation)
- Hijacker (comics), the name of two Marvel Comics characters
- The Hi-Jackers, a 1963 British 'B' crime thriller film

== See also ==
- Hijacked (disambiguation)
