= KCSP =

KCSP may refer to:

- KCSP-FM, a radio station (90.3 FM) licensed to Casper, Wyoming, United States
- KFNZ (AM), a radio station (610 AM) licensed to Kansas City, Missouri, United States, which held the call sign KCSP from 2003 to 2024
- KC Space Pirates, a team that competed in Space Elevator Games
- King's Cross St Pancras tube station, a London Underground station in the United Kingdom
- Knowingly Concealing Stolen Property, see possession of stolen goods
