= Skyjacker =

Skyjacker may refer to:

- A person who commits an aircraft hijacking, a form of air piracy
- Sawyer Skyjacker II, an American experimental aircraft design
- Skyjacker (EP), an EP by Trumans Water

== See also ==
- Air pirate (disambiguation)
- Hijacking
- Skyjack (disambiguation)
- Skyjacked (disambiguation)
- The Skyjacker's Tale (2016 film) documentary about Ishmael Muslim Ali
- Sky pirate (disambiguation)
