= Space Pirate =

A space pirate is a stock character in science fiction who conducts piracy in space.

Space Pirate may also refer to:

== Film ==
- Harlock: Space Pirate, a 2013 animated film

== Literature ==
- The Space Pirate, a 1953 novel by Jack Vance, also titled The Five Gold Bands
- Space Pirates, a 1980 novel in the Lord Tedric series by Gordon Eklund and E. E. "Doc" Smith
- Ned Feldman, Space Pirate, a 1994 children's book by Daniel Pinkwater
- Space Pirates (novel), the eighth book in the Ryder Hook series
- Space Pirates, a 2019 book in the Galaxy Warriors series by Steve Barlow and Steve Skidmore

== Television ==
=== Episodes ===
- "Space Pirates", Archer season 10, episode 7 (2019)
- "Space Pirates", Fireball XL5 episode 8 (1962)
- "Space Pirates", Gilligan's Planet episode 9 (1982)
- "Space Pirates", Johnny Cypher in Dimension Zero episode 93 (1968)
- "Space Pirates", Mr. Osomatsu season 2, episode 16a (2018)
- "Space Pirates", Return to Jupiter episode 13 (1997)
- "Space Pirates!", VeggieTales in the City season 1, episode 2a (2017)
- "The Space Pirate", Casper and the Angels episode 3b (1979)
- "The Space Pirate", Lunar Jim season 1, episode 8b (2006)
- The Space Pirates, Doctor Who season 6, story 49, episodes 29–34 (1969)
- "The Space Pirates", Galaxy Goof-Ups episode 4 (1978)
- "The Space Pirates", Josie and the Pussycats in Outer Space episode 8 (1972)

=== Series ===
- Space Pirates (2007 TV series), a children's television series on CBeebies

== Other uses ==
- "Space Pirates", a song by Alice Cooper
- Space Pirates (Metroid), one of the main antagonists and species of the Metroid video game series
- Space Pirates (video game), a 1992 light gun Laserdisc video game
- KC Space Pirates, a Kansas City (KC) space-elevator competition team

== See also ==
- Sky pirate (disambiguation)
