= Sky Bandits =

Sky Bandits may refer to:

- Sky Bandits (1940 film), an American film directed by Ralph Staub
- Sky Bandits (1986 film), a British film directed by Zoran Perisic

== See also ==
- Sky pirate (disambiguation)
