= King of Clubs (video game) =

2007 video game

- Developer: Oxygen Studios
- Publishers: EU: Oxygen Games; NA: Crave Entertainment
- Platforms: Wii, PlayStation 2, PlayStation Portable, Windows
- Release: PlayStation 2 & PC: EU: October 26, 2007; Wii: EU: March 28, 2008; NA: July 31, 2008; PlayStation Portable: EU: March 28, 2008
- Genre: Sports
- Modes: Single-player, multiplayer

King of Clubs is a 2007 golf video game developed by Oxygen Studios and published by Oxygen Interactive. It was released for the Wii, PlayStation 2, PlayStation Portable, and Windows. It received "generally unfavorable reviews" according to Metacritic.

== Gameplay ==
King of Clubs involves a rich Elvis Presley-like man named "Big Bubba" who opens a themed crazy golf course. The game features 96 holes set in 5 different environment themes. Each environment theme has its own resident "Course Pro" in suitably themed fancy dress costume. In addition, players are able to unlock and use various clubs and balls.

== Reception ==
King of Clubs received "generally unfavorable reviews" according to Metacritic.

Reception

Aggregate score
Aggregator	Score
Metacritic	35/100 (Wii)

Review scores
Publication	Score
Eurogamer	3/10 (Wii)
GameSpot	5/10 (PS2)
GamesRadar+	1/5 (Wii)
GameZone	3/10 (Wii)
IGN	3.5/10 (Wii)
NGamer	20/100 (Wii)
Nintendo World Report	2/10 (Wii)
Official Nintendo Magazine	32/100 (Wii)
VideoGamer.com	4/10 (PSP)
