= Patent pirate =

Patent pirate may refer to:

- Someone who willfully commits patent infringement
- Patent troll, someone who defends their patents with undue aggression, often with no intention to market or manufacture the patented invention
- Someone who utilizes a submarine patent, a type of patent whose issuance is intentionally delayed for several years to maximize benefit to the holder

== See also ==
- Pirate (disambiguation)
