= Anti-piracy =

Anti-piracy may refer to:

- Anti-piracy measures – measures to combat or prevent maritime piracy
- Anti-piracy (copy protection) – efforts to fight or prevent copyright infringement, counterfeiting, and other violations of intellectual property laws

== See also ==
- Pirate (disambiguation)
