= The Pirates! in an Adventure with the Romantics =

Fifth pirate novel by Gideon Defoe

- Cover art for the Hardback edition
- Author: Gideon Defoe with Richard Murkin
- Illustrator: Dave Senior
- Language: English
- Series: The Pirates!
- Genre: Comedy
- Publisher: Orion Books
- Publication date: 30 August 2012
- Publication place: United Kingdom
- Media type: Print (Hardcover)
- ISBN: 978-1408802229
- Preceded by: The Pirates! in an Adventure with Napoleon

The Pirates! in an Adventure with the Romantics is the fifth novel in Gideon Defoe's The Pirates! series. It was released on 30 August 2012.

== Plot ==
The Pirates encounter Romantic poets on the shore of Lake Geneva: Lord Byron, Percy Bysshe Shelley and Mary Shelley.
