= Gideon Defoe =

English novelist

- Born: 26 December 1975 (age 50); London, England
- Education: University of Oxford
- Occupation: Novelist
- Writing career
- Genres: Historical fiction Fantasy comedy
- Subject: Pirates
- Notable work: The Pirates! book series

Gideon Defoe (born 26 December 1975) is an English novelist of The Pirates!, a historical fiction fantasy comedy book series about a group of pirates on their adventures. He also wrote the screenplay for The Pirates! Band of Misfits which is an Aardman Animations stop-motion animated feature film based on The Pirates! in an Adventure with Scientists, the first book in The Pirates! book series. According to his 2020 book An Atlas of Extinct Countries, Defoe also does film development work with Locksmith Animation and StudioCanal and is developing a TV sitcom with BBC Studios.

== Bibliography ==
=== The Pirates! book series ===
- The Pirates! in an Adventure with Scientists (2004)
- The Pirates! in an Adventure with Whaling (2005)
- The Pirates! in an Adventure with Communists (2006)
- The Pirates! in an Adventure with Napoleon (2008)
- The Pirates! in an Adventure with the Romantics (2012)

=== Other books ===
- How Animals Have Sex (2005)
- Elite Dangerous: Docking is Difficult (2014)
- An Atlas of Extinct Countries (2020)

== Awards ==
Year	Award	Category	Nominee	Result	Ref.
2002	Adecco Temp of the Month Award	—N/a	—N/a	Won	
2012	40th Annie Awards	Writing in an Animated Feature Production	The Pirates! Band of Misfits	Nominated	
