= Joseph Nicollet =

French geographer, astronomer, and mathematician

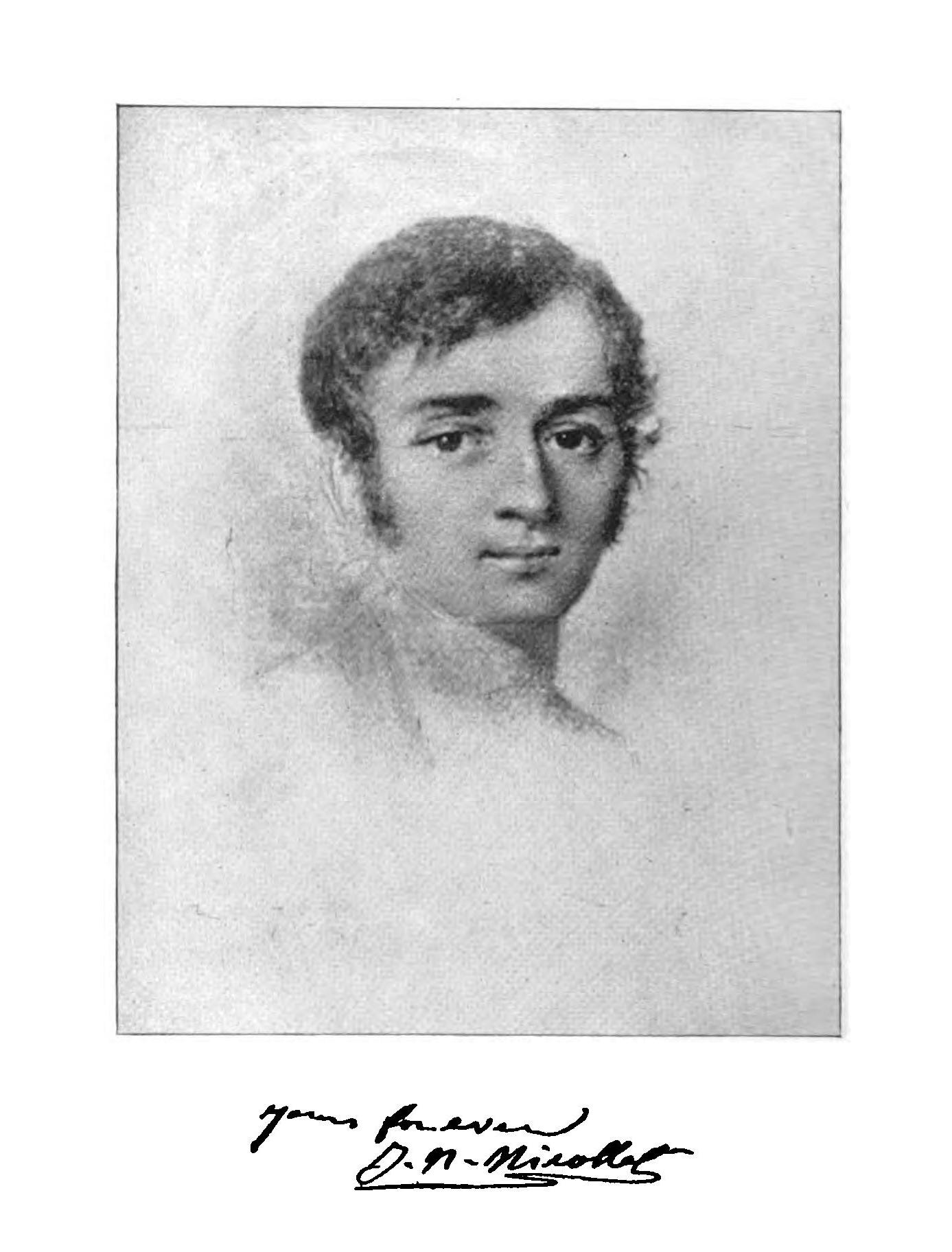
- Portrait and autograph of Nicollet
- Born: Joseph Nicolas Nicollet; July 24, 1786; Cluses, Savoy, Kingdom of Sardinia
- Died: September 11, 1843 (aged 57); Washington, D.C., United States
- Resting place: Congressional Cemetery
- Other name: Jean-Nicolas Nicollet
- Occupations: Explorer, mathematician
- Known for: Cartography of the Mississippi River

Joseph Nicolas Nicollet (July 24, 1786 – September 11, 1843), also known as Jean-Nicolas Nicollet, was a French geographer, astronomer, and mathematician known for mapping the Upper Mississippi River basin during the 1830s. Nicollet led three expeditions in the region between the Mississippi and Missouri Rivers, primarily in Minnesota, South Dakota, and North Dakota.

Before emigrating to the United States, Nicollet was a professor of mathematics at Collège Louis-le-Grand, and a professor and astronomer at the Paris Observatory with Pierre-Simon Laplace. Political and academic changes in France led Nicollet to travel to the United States to do work that would bolster his reputation among academics in Europe. He was elected a member of the American Philosophical Society in 1842.

Nicollet's maps were among the most accurate of the time, correcting errors made by Zebulon Pike, and they provided the basis for all subsequent maps of the American interior. They were also among the first to depict elevation by hachuring and the only maps to use regional Native American placenames. Nicollet's Map of the Hydrographical Basin of the Upper Mississippi was published in 1843, following his death. Nicollet Tower, located in Sisseton, South Dakota is a monument to Nicollet and his work and was constructed in 1991.

== Early life and education ==
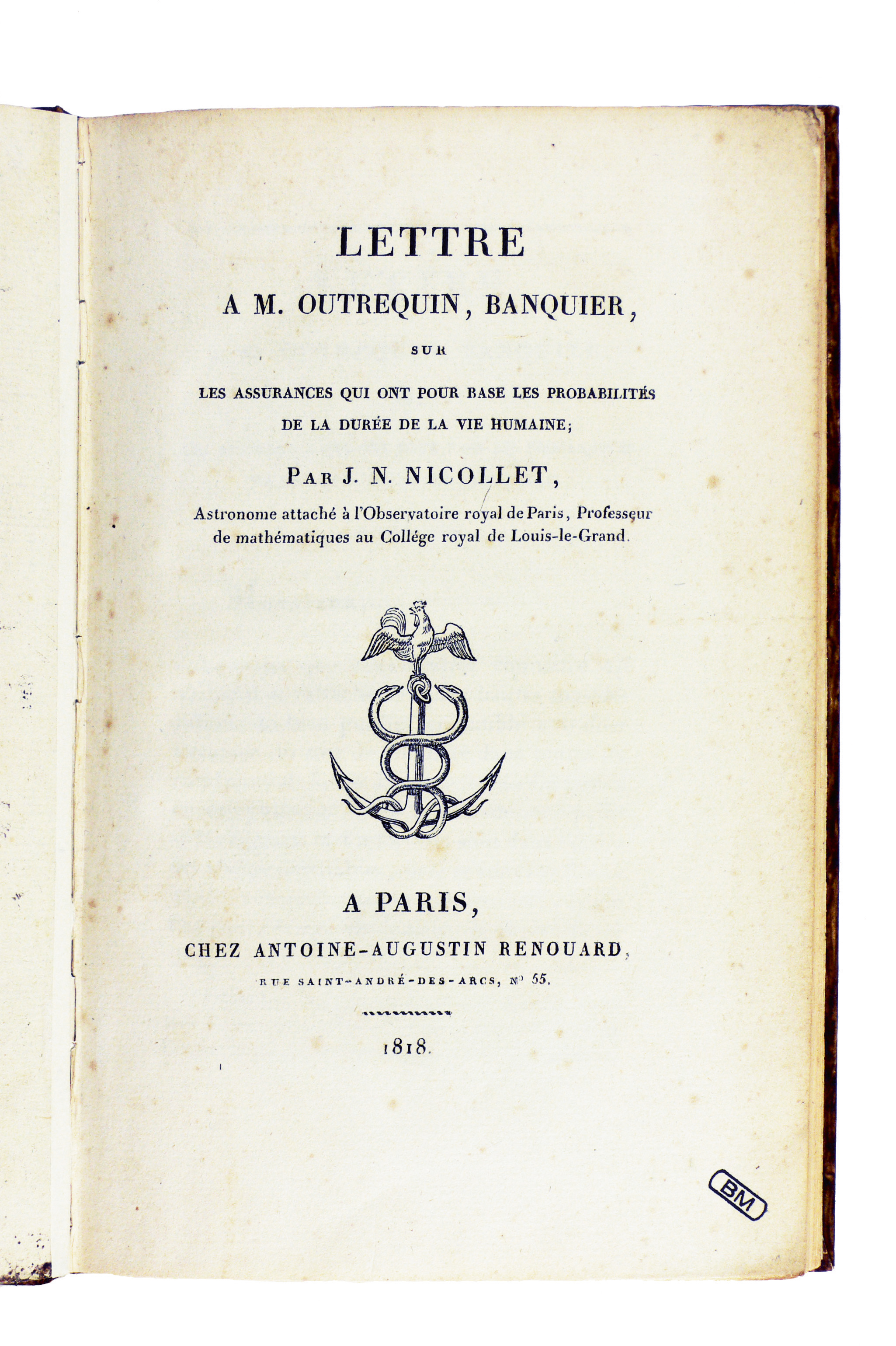
Lettre sur les assurances, 1818.

Nicollet was born at Cluses in Savoy. He was very bright, showing aptitude in mathematics and astronomy that earned him a scholarship to the Jesuit college in Chambéry. He began teaching mathematics at age 19. In 1817, he was appointed as a professor and astronomer at the Paris Observatory and worked with scientist and mathematician Pierre-Simon Laplace. While working at the observatory, Nicollet discovered a comet and built a reputation as an expert in astronomy and physical geography. During the 1820s, he worked as a mathematics professor at the Collège Louis-le-Grand.

== Emigration, 1832 ==
Nicollet encountered financial and professional difficulties resulting from political turbulence in France following the July Revolution (1830) and the rising dominance of physics as a laboratory science. Penniless, he emigrated to the United States in 1832, sailing from the port of Brest. Nicollet hoped to boost his reputation among European academics through his work in the US. He intended to make a "scientific tour" of the country and had a goal of using his expertise to accurately map the Mississippi River Valley. He arrived in Washington, D.C., where he met with scientists and government officials, discussing scientific surveys of the country. He traveled to New Orleans, from where he intended to proceed to St. Louis, Missouri, but due to a cholera outbreak, travel by steamboat was practically halted. Instead he spent the next three years traveling throughout the south, primarily between New Orleans and Baltimore. Nicollet finally arrived in St. Louis in 1835.

== Mapping the Mississippi ==
Upon his arrival 1835 in St. Louis, Nicollet gained support for his plan to map the Mississippi River from the American Fur Company and the wealthy Choteau family (who had helped found St. Louis and long had a fur trading monopoly with the Osage tribe based on contracts with former Spanish authorities and later status as U.S. Indian agent). From St. Louis, he took a boat up the river to Fort Snelling, Minnesota. Over the next 4 years Nicollet led three expeditions exploring the Upper Mississippi, mostly in the area that is now Minnesota, North Dakota and South Dakota.

=== First expedition, 1836–37 ===
Nicollet's map of the Hydrographical Basin of the Upper Mississippi River, 1843.

The first expedition took place in 1836–37 and was privately funded by American Fur and the Choteaus. Nicollet departed Fort Snelling by canoe on July 29, 1836, accompanied by Chagobay, an Ojibwe chief, his nine-year-old son, and a half-French guide named Brunia. Nicollet explored the Mississippi to its source of Lake Itasca and the nearby Mississippi tributary, the St. Croix River. The results of this expedition corrected an error in Zebulon Pike's 1805 map, which placed the mouth of the Crow Wing River too far to the west, rendering all maps of this area inaccurate.

=== Second expedition, 1838 ===
Upon his return to Washington, D.C. to report his findings, Nicollet was appointed to head the newly formed Corps of Topographical Engineers and lead a War Department-funded expedition to map the area between the Mississippi and Missouri Rivers in order to correct the western maps affected by Pike's mistake. The expedition party set out on June 18, 1838, from Traverse des Sioux. The party was composed of John C. Frémont, who was appointed by the War Department to assist on the expedition in lieu of a military escort, Joseph Renville Jr., and Joseph LaFromboise, an agent for the American Fur Company who was half French, half Native American. On July 4, 1838, the expedition arrived at Pipestone Quarry, where the party members carved their initials on a rock. From there, the party proceeded along the Minnesota and Blue Earth Rivers toward Spirit Lake, Iowa.

=== Third expedition ===
In his third and final expedition, guided by Louison Freniere, Nicollet retained the assistance from Frémont and was joined for part of his journey by the Jesuit Missionary Pierre-Jean De Smet. De Smet used skills learned from Nicollet to make his own maps of the Missouri River basin. On this and on his second expedition, botanist Charles Geyer took extensive notes cataloging the area's native plants. This journey was also government funded and took Nicollet northwest from Iowa along the Missouri River toward Fort Pierre, South Dakota. His efforts were hampered as the Steamboat Pirate carrying his supplies sank in April 1839. On July 11, 1839, the second leg of his trip set out from Fort Pierre for Devil's Lake, North Dakota. From there, Nicollet travelled back across the Coteau des Prairies to Fort Snelling.

=== Death ===
On September 11, 1839, Nicollet returned to Washington, D.C. where he worked on consolidating the information collected into the Report to the Senate. He fully intended to return to Minnesota to continue his work, but failing health led to his death in Washington in 1843. He is buried at the Congressional Cemetery, his gravestone noting "He will triumph who understands how to conciliate and combine with the greatest skill the benefits of the past with the demands of the future."

== Legacy ==
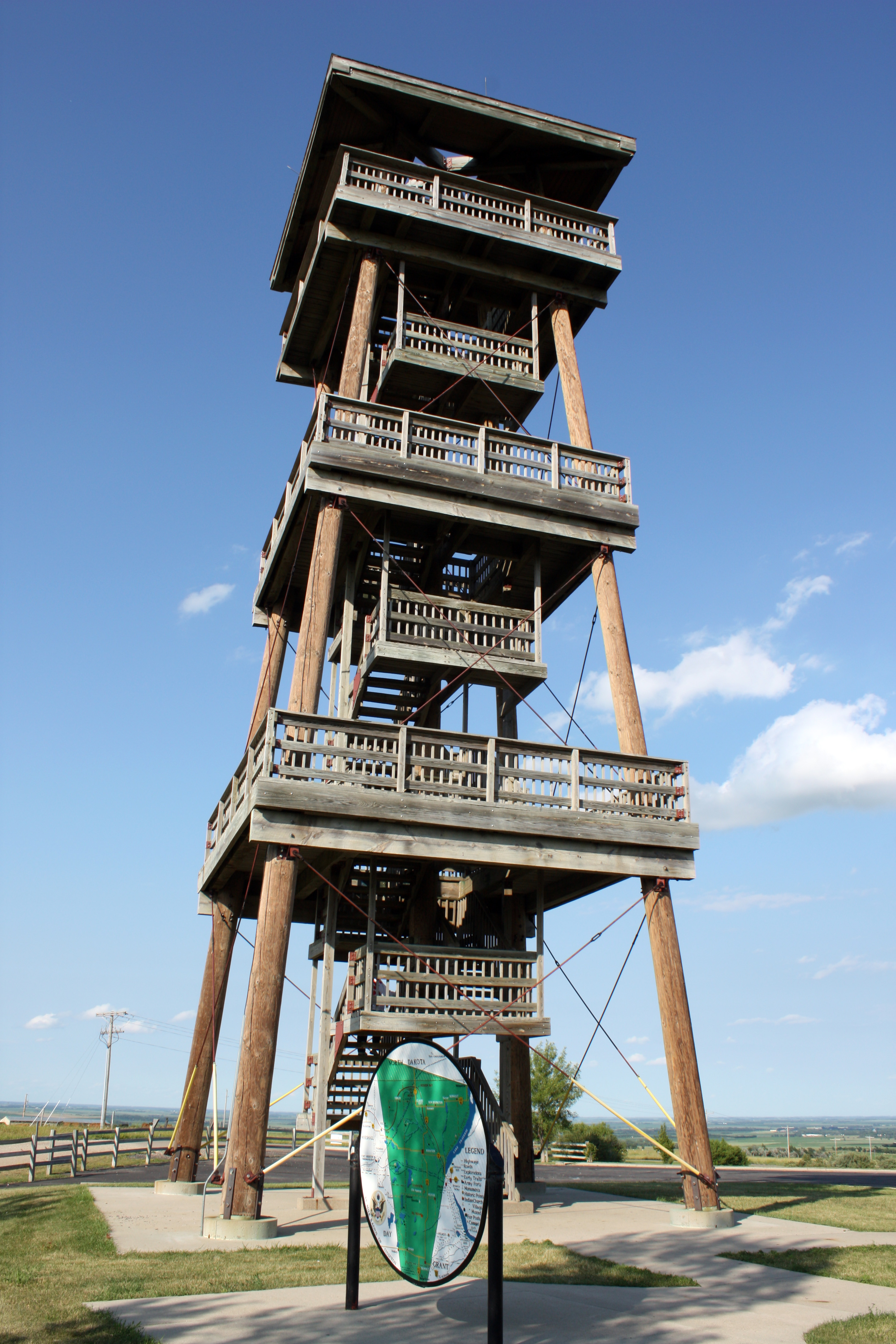
Nicollet Tower, located in Sisseton, South Dakota

Later in 1843, a book containing much of his work, Map of the Hydrographical Basin of the Upper Mississippi, was published. The maps in the book were highly accurate and covered a region more than half the size of Europe. Moreover, Nicollet's maps were among the first in the world to depict elevation by hachuring and are among the only sources for original Native American place names in the region. Many of Nicollet's sketches and journals from his expeditions are housed at the Library of Congress, the Smithsonian Institution, and the National Archives. In 1847, one of his expeditions' private sponsors, Pierre Chouteau Jr., established Fort Benton as the furthest fur-trading post on the Upper Missouri River, in what became known as Chouteau County, Montana in his honor.

Nicollet's own name is applied to several places in the region he explored, including Nicollet Island, Nicollet Avenue in Minneapolis, Nicollet County and the city of Nicollet, all located in Minnesota.

In 1991, the Joseph N. Nicollet Tower and Interpretive Center was constructed in Sisseton, South Dakota near the path Nicollet had taken from Devil's Lake back to Fort Snelling on his final expedition. A banker and Sisseton resident became fascinated with Nicollet's story and work after reading Joseph N. Nicollet on the Plains and Prairies, a translation of Nicollet's journals, and raised $335,000 from seven local donors to build the monument. The 80-foot tall tower with 96 steps was primarily built of Douglas-fir from Idaho with concrete pillars and steel bolts. From the top, six counties in three states (South Dakota, North Dakota, and Minnesota) can be seen, including a view of the Laurentian Divide, the Coteau des Prairies, and the ancient glacial valley that Nicollet mapped. The Interpretive Center houses 2,400 square feet of classroom space and exhibits, including Nicollet's map and a mural of Nicollet's meeting with Wanata, chief of the Yankton Dakota.
