= Oxygen Studios =

UK video game developer

- Company type: Private
- Industry: Video games
- Founded: 2007
- Headquarters: Croydon, United Kingdom
- Services: Video game development
- Number of employees: 14
- Parent: Oxygen Games
- Website: www.oxygen-studios.com

Oxygen Studios was a video game development studio set up by Oxygen Games in 2007. The studio's primary focus is on producing mainstream titles on Wii and Nintendo DS. It also collaborates with third parties to bring their titles to PlayStation 2 and PC.

In June 2008, Oxygen Studios were nominated for the Develop Industry Excellence Awards 2008 in the category of Best New UK/European Studio alongside FinBlade, Konami Paris, Rockstar London and Doublesix.

In January 2009, it was announced that the studio had been put up for sale by its parent company, Oxygen Games, as they looked to move back to an external development business model.

== Games Developed by Oxygen Studios ==
- My Make-Up (2008, Nintendo DS)
- My Dress-Up (2008, Nintendo DS)
- My Secret Diary (2008, Nintendo DS)
- Pirates: The Key of Dreams (2008, WiiWare)
- Pirates: Duels on the High Seas (2008, Nintendo DS)
- King of Clubs (2007–2008, Nintendo DS/PC/PlayStation 2/Wii)
