= The Jesus Factor =

1970 novel by Edwin Corley

- Author: Edwin Corley
- Language: English
- Genre: Contemporary Fiction
- Publisher: Stein & Day Paperback
- English publication date: 1970
- Pages: 320
- ISBN: 978-0812881042

The Jesus Factor is a 1970 conspiracy theory thriller novel by Edwin Corley based on the Manhattan Project of World War II and the bombing of Hiroshima and Nagasaki. It concerns issues relating to the "arms race" and the collective guilt of those involved with the bombings.

The premise is that during the development of nuclear weapons it is discovered that they will only detonate if stationary in a gravitational field, making their use as air-dropped bombs impossible. In the novel, the nuclear attacks of World War II are simulated using aeroplane-mounted magnesium flares and dispersed radionuclides, taking advantage of the destruction caused by an earthquake. An international conspiracy hides this fact in the interest of maintaining nuclear deterrence.

The story concerns events when this status quo is threatened by one of the original bombardiers, who discovers the conspiracy while running for US president with a policy of nuclear disarmament.
