= The Pirates! =

Comedy novel series by Gideon Defoe

- The Pirates! in an Adventure with Scientists; The Pirates! in an Adventure with Whaling; The Pirates! in an Adventure with Communists; The Pirates! in an Adventure with Napoleon; The Pirates! in an Adventure with the Romantics
- Author: Gideon Defoe
- Country: United Kingdom
- Language: English
- Genre: Comedy; Historical fiction
- Publisher: 1-4: Weidenfeld & Nicolson (UK); 5: Bloomsbury Publishing (UK)
- Published: 2004-2012
- Media type: Print (hardcover and paperback); Audiobook

The Pirates! is a series of five comedy books following a group of pirates on their adventures. It is written by British author Gideon Defoe and was published starting in 2004 by Weidenfeld & Nicolson. The fifth book, The Pirates! in an Adventure with the Romantics was released in 2012, and was published by Bloomsbury Publishing.

== Books ==
1. The Pirates! In an Adventure with Scientists (2004)
2. The Pirates! in an Adventure with Whaling (2005)
3. The Pirates! in an Adventure with Communists (2006)
4. The Pirates! in an Adventure with Napoleon (2008)
5. The Pirates! in an Adventure with the Romantics (2012)

== Characters ==
=== The Pirates ===
- The Pirate Captain, the protagonist of the series. He is arrogant, naïve, and mostly incompetent as a pirate and as a sea captain, to the point of being completely unaware of how to sail a ship. The few times he attempts to capture and loot ships, he fails in spectacular fashion. Instead, he and his pirate crew spend most of their time having "adventures," which always involve famous historical and/or literary figures. In spite of his blundering, the Pirate Captain is ultimately well-meaning, and very much respected by his crew. He is frequently described as "all teeth and curls, but with a pleasant, open face," and is proud of his luxuriant beard.
- The Pirate with a Scarf, the Pirate Captain's closest best friend and trustworthy, logical second-in-command, who serves as a straight man for his antics. It is strongly implied that he does most of the actual work of sailing the ship. Despite occasionally chafing at his sidekick role, the Pirate with a Scarf is unfailingly loyal to the Captain.
- The Pirate in Red, a sarcastic, world-weary pirate who frequently makes biting remarks about the Pirate Captain and other crew members.
- The Pirate in Green, described as an "everyman type" by the Pirate Captain.
- The Albino Pirate, whom the Captain calls the ship's "happy idiot."
- Jennifer, a Victorian lady who joins the pirate crew during An Adventure With Scientists.
- Various other pirates described by the Captain as mostly interchangeable. These include the Pirate with Gout, the Pirate with Bedroom Eyes, the Pirate with a Hook for a Hand, the Pirate from the Bronx, and others.

=== Other characters ===
==== The Pirates! In An Adventure With Scientists ====
- Charles Darwin, a friendly naturalist who is attempting to prove his theory of evolution by exhibiting an educated monkey named "Mr. Bobo the Man-Panzee." He appears in An Adventure With Scientists.
- Robert FitzRoy, captain of HMS Beagle.
- Bishop of Oxford, antagonist of An Adventure With Scientists.

==== The Pirates! In An Adventure With Whaling ====
- Captain Ahab, the fictional character from Moby-Dick, who is obsessed with hunting down his nemesis, the White Whale.

This book was originally released in September 2005 in the U.K. under the title, The Pirates! in an Adventure with Whaling. In October 2005 it was released in the U.S. under the title, The Pirates! in an Adventure with Ahab. In January 2012 it was released in paperback form in the U.K. under the title, The Pirates! in an Adventure with Moby Dick.

==== The Pirates! In An Adventure With Communists ====
- Karl Marx, philosopher and founder of Communism, who is mistaken for the Pirate Captain due to his similarly luxuriant beard.
- Friedrich Engels, Marx's frequent collaborator, appears as his put-upon sidekick who empathizes with the Pirate with a Scarf.
- Richard Wagner, composer of operas, who spearheads a plot to discredit Communism.
- Friedrich Nietzsche, who the book erroneously identifies as the founder of Fascism. The fictionalized version of Nietzsche wears a large mechanical exoskeleton, and plots to take over Europe so he can get a girlfriend.

==== The Pirates! In An Adventure With Napoleon ====
- Napoleon Bonaparte, a general from Revolutionary France, who butts heads with the Pirate Captain when they both retire to St. Helena at the same time.

==== The Pirates! In An Adventure With Romantics ====
- Mary Shelley, author of Frankenstein. Mary is a love interest for the Pirate Captain, who bonds with her over their shared love of monsters.
- Percy Bysshe Shelley, Mary's fiancé, an educated, pretentious Romantic poet.
- Lord Byron, an extremely loud and sex-crazed Romantic poet.
- Charles Babbage, a highly logical inventor who can't stand Romanticism.

=== Minor characters ===
- Black Bellamy, the Pirate Captain's arch-nemesis.
- Cutlass Liz, owner of a used-boat store.
- The Pirate King

== Film adaptation ==
Aardman Animations in partnership with Sony Pictures Animation loosely adapted The Pirates! in an Adventure with Scientists into a 3D stop-motion animated film internationally titled The Pirates! Band of Misfits. Released on 28 March 2012, and directed by Peter Lord, the film features the voices of Hugh Grant, Martin Freeman, David Tennant, Salma Hayek, Jeremy Piven, and Imelda Staunton. The film was met with very positive reviews, while it earned $118 million against the budget of $55 million. A short film, titled So You Want to Be a Pirate!, was released on the film's DVD and Blu-ray, and it shows The Pirate Captain hosting his own talk show about being a true pirate.
