= Piracy (disambiguation) =

Piracy is the act of robbery or criminality at sea.

It may also refer to:

- Aircraft hijacking
- Broadcast signal intrusion
- Copyright infringement, the unauthorized use of published media
  - Cable television piracy
  - Music piracy
  - Pirate decryption
  - The Pirate Bay
  - Video game piracy
- Online piracy, the unauthorized downloading of online digital media
- Piracy (comics), published from 1954 to 1955
- Unlicensed broadcasting, including:
  - Pirate radio
  - Pirate television
