= Hijack =

Hijack, Highjack, or High Jack may refer to:

- Hijacking (disambiguation), to forcibly seize control of something

== Film and television ==
- Hijack (1973 film), an American television action film
- Hijack! (1975 film), a British children's drama film
- Hijack (2008 film), an Indian Hindi-language action film
- High Jack (film), a 2018 Indian Hindi-language comedy
- Hijack (TV series), a 2023 British thriller series
- "Hijack" (The Professionals), a 1980 TV episode

== Music ==
=== Groups ===
- Hijack (group), a 1980s/90s British hip hop group
- Hijack (Thai band), a 1990s Thai boy band

=== Albums ===
- Hijack (Amon Düül II album), 1974
- ¡Soltad a Barrabás!, or Hi-Jack, by Barrabás, 1974

=== Songs ===
- "Hi-Jack", by Barrabás, 1974; covered by Herbie Mann and Cissy Houston, 1975
- "Highjack", by ASAP Rocky, 2024
- "Hijack", by Paul Kantner and Jefferson Starship from Blows Against the Empire, 1970
- "Hijack", by Tyga from Hotel California, 2013
- "High Jack", by Psychic TV, 1990

== See also ==
- LoJack, a stolen vehicle recovery system
- Hijack seat, a poker term
