= The Pirates! in an Adventure with Communists =

Third pirate novel by Gideon Defoe

- Cover art for the Hardback edition
- Author: Gideon Defoe with Richard Murkin
- Language: English
- Series: The Pirates!
- Genre: Comedy novel
- Publisher: Orion Books
- Publication date: 14 September 2006
- Publication place: United Kingdom
- Media type: Print (hardcover)
- Pages: 167
- ISBN: 978-0-297-84867-7
- Preceded by: The Pirates! in an Adventure with Whaling
- Followed by: The Pirates! in an Adventure with Napoleon

The Pirates! in an Adventure with Communists is the third book in The Pirates! series by Gideon Defoe to feature his hapless pirate crew. It was published in 2006 by Orion Books (ISBN 0-297-84867-4).

This book follows the adventures of the Pirate Captain and his crew through Paris and London—accompanied by Karl Marx and his sidekick Friedrich Engels—as they attempt to clear the communists' good name after it is sullied by Richard Wagner and his malevolent benefactor.
