= Pirates: The Key of Dreams =

2008 video game

- Developer: Oxygen Studios
- Publisher: Oxygen Games
- Platform: Wii (WiiWare)
- Release: EU: July 18, 2008; NA: July 21, 2008
- Genre: Shoot 'em up
- Modes: Single-player, Multiplayer

Pirates: The Key of Dreams is a shoot 'em up video game by developers Oxygen Games for WiiWare. A prequel to Oxygen's Nintendo DS game Pirates: Duels on the High Seas, it was released in Europe on July 18, 2008 and in North America on July 21, 2008. It costs 1000 Wii Points and takes up 125 Blocks.

== Overview ==
The plot sees players, in the role of a navy captain, sent undercover in the Caribbean to retrieve an artifact known as "The Key of Dreams" from notorious pirate Blackbeard. The story mode takes place over 10 levels.

Players directly control a sailing ship, seen from an overhead view, to do battle with. Players can recruit various crew members, such as navigators and master gunners to upgrade the abilities of their ship, in addition to their weapons which include cannons, mines and rockets.

In addition to the story mode, Pirates: The Key of Dreams also features a single player skirmish mode, where the player battles the computer in a variety of arenas, as well as an offline multiplayer battle mode that supports up to four players. There will be 35 skirmish/multiplayer battle maps in addition to bonus ships not selectable in the story mode.

== Reception ==
WiiWare World gave the Pirates: The Key of Dreams a 5/10, calling it a "mixed bag". They were disappointed in the single-player mode, believing it to be repetitive and short lived, with "little real challenge". They were also puzzled by the general lack of music during the game, and felt the game further suffers from very frequent pop-up messages that disrupt the gameplay. However, they found the multiplayer battle mode to be "relatively decent", though they believed it would have benefited by taking the mode online. IGN, which gave it a 4.7/10, felt the game "looks good and holds promise" but also hinted at rushed development and sloppy design. They also agreed that the single player was boring and held little challenge, and that the multiplayer mode was a "waste of time" with anything less than four players.

Eurogamer thought the game was "a bit shallow" with a control system they felt was counter-intuitive. Believing that this results in the game with a "very finite shelf life", they gave the game a 6 out of 10. N-Europe criticised the game for being short and overpriced, but with some extra life to be found in multiplayer; they gave it a 5/10.
