= Edwin Corley =

American novelist (1931–1981)

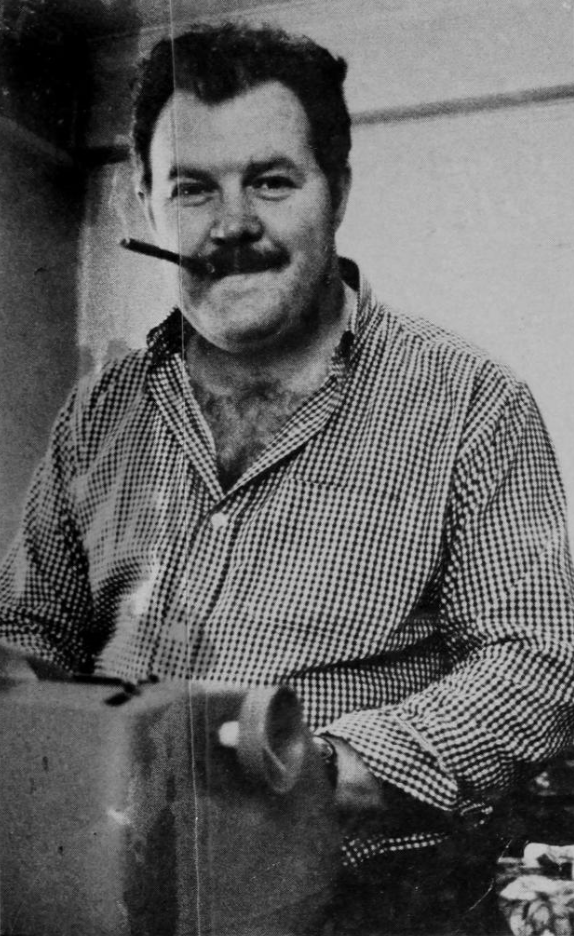
- Corley circa 1970
- Born: Edwin Ray Corley; October 22, 1931; Bayonne, New Jersey, U.S.
- Died: November 7, 1981 (aged 50); Gulfport, Mississippi, U.S.
- Other names: David Harper, William Judson, Will Collins, Patrick Buchanan
- Occupation: Writer
- Years active: 1969–1981
- Notable work: The Jesus Factor

Edwin Ray Corley (October 22, 1931 – November 7, 1981) was an American novelist most famous for his thrillers Siege, Air Force One, and The Jesus Factor. He used the pseudonyms David Harper, William Judson, and Will Collins and worked with novelist Jack Murphy using the pseudonym Patrick Buchanan.

== Early life ==
Edwin Ray Corley was born October 22, 1931, in Bayonne, New Jersey. Corley served in the United States Army Air Corps and the United States Air Force; he was stationed in Korea. While stationed there, he wrote for the American military newspaper Stars and Stripes. He was Catholic. In 1974, he moved to Sherburne, New York.

== Career ==
While stationed in Korea, Corley wrote for the American military newspaper Stars and Stripes. In the 1950s, Corley published and wrote for Off-Broadway Magazine. He was also a copyeditor for advertising in the late 1960s; at about the same time he was a vice president of the Compton Agency, then became vice president of the Dancer-Fitzgerald-Sample Advertising company.

Corley then shifted to writing novels. He used various pseudonyms in addition to his own name to publish his books. He used the pseudonyms David Harper, William Judson, and Will Collins and worked with novelist Jack Murphy, using the pseudonym Patrick Buchanan. Many of his books had science fiction elements.

Corley's first novel, Siege, was published in 1969 by Stein and Day, and focused on a black revolutionary uprising that emerges around New York City. The book was a bestseller. His second book, The Jesus Factor (which centers around nuclear warfare) was also a bestseller; his later books included Sargasso and Air Force One. His 1972 novel Acapulco Gold focuses on an American president attempting to legalize marijuana. Corley's Hollywood-centered and partly factual novel, Shadows (1975), was the first work of fiction to feature Dorothy Parker appearing as herself. Other major characters are William Randolph Hearst, his paramour Marion Davies, and Vivien Leigh.

As Patrick Buchanan, Corley and Murphy wrote a series of novels (A Murder of Crows, 1970; A Parliament of Owls, 1971; A Requiem of Sharks, 1973; and A Sounder of Swine, 1974) featuring the character Charity Tucker, a tall, blonde, intelligent television reporter, who teamed with private investigator Ben Shock to investigate various murders. Under the pseudonym Will Collins, he wrote a novelization of the 1976 film Grizzly. Two of his books were adapted into movies: Skyjacked (1972; based on Hijacked) and Cold River (1982).

== Death ==
Corley died November 7, 1981 in Gulfport, Mississippi.

== Bibliography ==
- Corley, Edwin (1969). Siege. New York: Stein and Day. ISBN 0-8128-1224-7.
- Corley, Edwin (1970). The Jesus Factor. New York: Stein and Day. ISBN 0-8128-1310-3.
- Corley, Edwin (1971). Farewell, My Slightly Tarnished Hero. New York: Dodd, Mead & Company. ISBN 0-396-06364-0.
- Corley, Edwin (1972). Acapulco Gold. New York: Dodd, Mead & Company. ISBN 0-396-06632-1.
- Corley, Edwin (1975). Shadows. New York: Stein and Day. ISBN 0-8128-1741-9.
- Moore, Robin (1976). Combat Pay. New York: Manor Books. ISBN 0-532-19130-7. (uncredited co-author)
- Corley, Edwin (1977). Sargasso. Garden City: Doubleday & Company. ISBN 0-385-11401-X.
- Corley, Edwin (1978). Air Force One. Garden City: Doubleday & Company. ISBN 0-385-11402-8.
- Corley, Edwin (1980). The Genesis Rock. Garden City: Doubleday & Company. ISBN 0-385-15018-0.
- Corley, Edwin (1981). Long Shots. Garden City: Doubleday & Company. ISBN 0-385-15922-6.

=== As David Harper ===
- Harper, David (1970). Hijacked. New York: Dodd, Mead & Company. ISBN 0-396-06197-4.
- Harper, David (1971). Big Saturday. New York: Dodd, Mead & Company. ISBN 0-396-06362-4.
- Harper, David (1973). The Green Air. New York: Mason & Lipscomb. ISBN 0-396-06197-4.
- Harper, David (1975). The Patchwork Man. New York: Dodd, Mead & Company. ISBN 0-396-07135-X.
- Harper, David (1976). The Hanged Men. New York: Dodd, Mead & Company. ISBN 0-396-07346-8.
- Moore, Robin; Harper, David (1976). The Last Superbowl. New York: Neptune Books. OCLC 3088398.

=== As William Judson ===
- Judson, William (1973). Alice and Me. New York: Arthur Field Books. ISBN 0-525-63000-7.
- Judson, William (1974). Cold River. New York: Mason & Lipscomb. ISBN 0-88405-095-5. Published in the United Kingdom as Winter Kill.
- Judson, William (1976). Kilman's Landing. New York: Mason/Charter. ISBN 0-88405-138-2.

=== As Will Collins ===
- Collins, Will (1976). Grizzly. New York: Pyramid Publications. ISBN 0-515-04179-3.

=== As Patrick Buchanan (with Jack Murphy) ===
- Buchanan, Patrick (1970). A Murder of Crows. New York: Stein and Day. ISBN 0-8128-1278-6.
- Buchanan, Patrick (1971). The Parliament of Owls. New York: Stein and Day. ISBN 0-8128-1383-9.
- Buchanan, Patrick (1973). A Requiem of Sharks. New York: Dodd, Mead & Company. ISBN 0-396-06841-3.
- Buchanan, Patrick (1974). A Sounder of Swine. New York: Dodd, Mead & Company. ISBN 0-396-06999-1.
