= Pyrates (disambiguation) =

Pyrates is a 1991 comedy film.

Pyrates may also refer to:

- The Pyrates, a 1983 comedic novel by George MacDonald Fraser
- Mega Bloks Pyrates, a construction block toy line
- A General History of the Pyrates, a 1724 book about pirates
- Pyrates!, a Folk-rock band
- Pyrate Confraternity, a nickname for the National Association of Seadogs
