= Air pirate (disambiguation) =

Air pirate (also known as sky pirate) is a stock character from science fiction and fantasy.

Air pirate may also refer to:

- A person who commits air piracy, the unlawful seizure of an aircraft by an individual or a group
- Air Pirates, a former group of cartoonists
- The Air Pirates (film), 1920 German film
- The Air Pirates, a nickname for the 1st Attack-Reconnaissance Battalion (AH-64) of the 211th Aviation Regiment (United States)

== See also ==
- Sky pirate (disambiguation)
- Pirate (disambiguation)
- Skyjacker (disambiguation)
