= Pirates: Duels on the High Seas =

2008 video game

- Developer(s): Oxygen Studios
- Publisher(s): Oxygen Games
- Platform(s): Nintendo DS
- Release: EU: September 19, 2008; NA: May 14, 2009
- Genre(s): Adventure, Shoot 'em up
- Mode(s): Single-player, Multiplayer

Pirates: Duels on the High Seas is an adventure game for Nintendo DS. It was developed by Oxygen Studios and published by Oxygen Games. The game is a sequel to the similar WiiWare title, Pirates: The Key of Dreams.

== Plot ==
An old man in a pub presents you with a riddle; after solving this riddle, you discover that possession of seven magical keys will provide you control over the seas. After collecting the first Key from Port Royal, you find a scrap of paper which informs you that unless you obtain the other six keys in six days' time, you will perish.

== Key Locations ==
The keys are spread throughout the Arctic, Bermuda Triangle, China Sea, Java Sea, Persia, Port Royal and Porto Bello levels.

== Reception ==
The game was awarded 78% by independent gaming website zConnection, scoring a Good rating.
