= The Pirates! In an Adventure with Scientists! =

2012 film by Peter Lord

- British theatrical release poster
- Directed by: Peter Lord
- Screenplay by: Gideon Defoe
- Based on: The Pirates! In an Adventure with Scientists by Gideon Defoe
- Produced by: Julie Lockhart; Peter Lord; David Sproxton
- Starring: Hugh Grant; David Tennant; Imelda Staunton; Martin Freeman; Jeremy Piven
- Cinematography: Frank Passingham
- Edited by: Justin Krish
- Music by: Theodore Shapiro
- Production companies: Columbia Pictures; Sony Pictures Animation; Aardman Features
- Distributed by: Sony Pictures Releasing
- Release dates: 28 March 2012 (United Kingdom); 27 April 2012 (United States)
- Running time: 88 minutes
- Countries: United Kingdom; United States
- Language: English
- Budget: $55 million
- Box office: $123 million

The Pirates! In an Adventure with Scientists! (released outside the UK as The Pirates! Band of Misfits) is a 2012 stop-motion animated swashbuckler comedy film directed by Peter Lord and written by Gideon Defoe, based on his 2004 novel. Produced by Columbia Pictures, Sony Pictures Animation and Aardman Features, it features the voices of Hugh Grant, David Tennant, Imelda Staunton, Martin Freeman, Jeremy Piven, Salma Hayek and Brian Blessed. The film follows a crew of amateur pirates in their attempt to win the Pirate of the Year competition.

The Pirates! was released on 28 March 2012 in the United Kingdom and on 27 April 2012 in the United States. The film received generally positive reviews and grossed $123 million against a $55 million budget. The film was nominated for the Academy Award for Best Animated Feature.

== Plot ==
In 1837 London, Admiral Cuthbert Collingwood informs Queen Victoria that the Royal Navy mostly dominates the ocean, but they are still dealing with pirates, whom she detests. Meanwhile, the Pirate Captain enters Blood Island's annual Pirate of the Year competition, where the winner is determined by who can steal the most treasure. After several failed attempts to plunder ships, the Captain and his crew raid HMS Beagle and capture Charles Darwin. Recognising the crew's dodo, Polly, whom they believe is a parrot, as the last of her species, Charles recommends that they enter her in the Scientist of the Year competition at the Royal Society of London. Assuming that the prize is money, the Captain agrees.

Allowing the pirates to stay at his house for the night, Charles tries to kidnap Polly with the help of his chimpanzee, Mr Bobo, but fails. The next day, the pirates enter the competition while posing as scientists and the dodo display wins the competition. However, instead of money, the prize turns out to be a meeting with the queen. Victoria requests Polly for her petting zoo, but the Captain refuses and inadvertently reveals his true identity. Before he can be executed, Charles, who is smitten with Victoria, informs her that Polly has been hidden and only the Captain knows where. Victoria pardons the Captain and orders Charles to find Polly.

Charles and Bobo get the Captain drunk at a tavern and attempt to kidnap Polly. The Captain chases them into the Tower of London, where Victoria awaits. After sending Charles and Bobo down a trapdoor into a garbage dump, she offers the Captain enough treasure to win Pirate of the Year in exchange for Polly; he accepts the offer and returns to his crew. At the Pirate of the Year ceremony, the Captain is declared the winner, but his rival, Black Bellamy, reveals his pardon and is therefore ineligible for the award due to no longer a pirate. The Captain has his new clothes taken, his treasure confiscated, and is exiled from Blood Island. When he reveals to his crew that he gave Polly away, they abandon him.

The Captain returns to London and reunites with Charles and Bobo, who have become tramps. The former reveals that Victoria never wanted Polly for the petting zoo after all and in fact intends to eat her, being a member of a club of world leaders who dine on endangered animals. Polly is to be served at their next banquet, aboard Victoria's flagship, the QV1. The Captain and Charles steal an airship and locate the QV1, while Bobo goes to find the crew. Aboard the QV1, the Captain and Charles find Polly, but are confronted by Victoria. Bobo and the crew come to their rescue. While fighting Victoria, they accidentally combine a stash of baking soda with vinegar, causing an explosion that breaks the ship in half. Victoria attempts to escape with Polly in the airship, only for her to retaliate. The Captain rescues Polly and the pirates escape, while a furious Victoria revokes the Captain's pardon as she drifts away inside her damaged airship.

Charles is taken to an island to continue discovering new animal species, while Victoria is left at the mercy of the animals she captured. Meanwhile, Bellamy has his award confiscated, due to the Captain's bounty. The Captain continues adventuring with his crew, now accompanied by Bobo.

== Voice cast ==
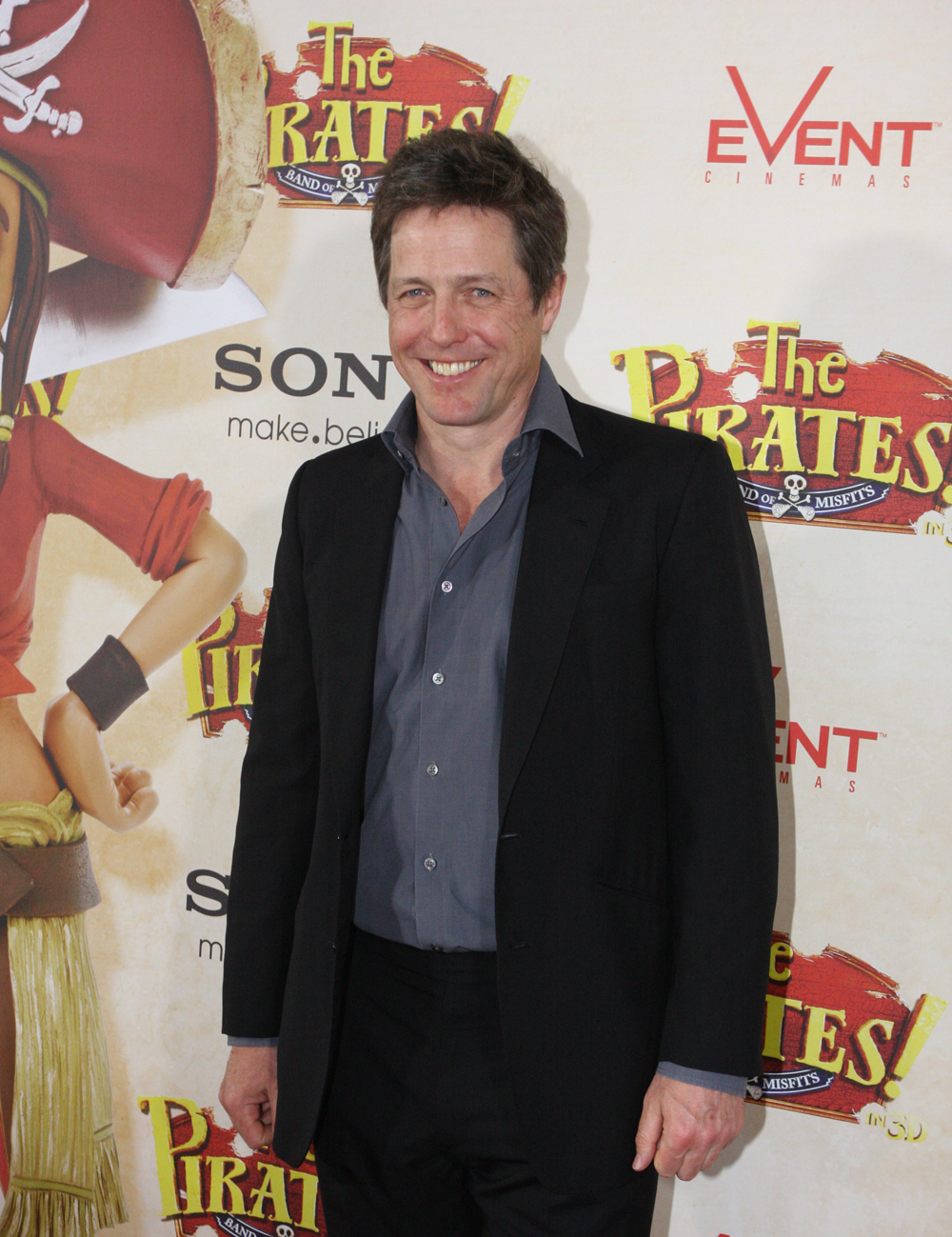
Hugh Grant in April 2012 at the film's premiere in Sydney, Australia

- Hugh Grant as The Pirate Captain
- Martin Freeman as The Pirate with a Scarf alias Number Two
- Imelda Staunton as Queen Victoria
- David Tennant as Charles Darwin
- Jeremy Piven as Black Bellamy
- Salma Hayek as Cutlass Liz
- Lenny Henry as Peg-Leg Hastings
- Brian Blessed as The Pirate King
- Russell Tovey as The Albino Pirate (United Kingdom)
  - Anton Yelchin as The Albino Pirate (United States)
- Brendan Gleeson as The Pirate with Gout
- Ashley Jensen as The Surprisingly Curvaceous Pirate
- Ben Whitehead as The Pirate Who Likes Sunsets and Kittens (United Kingdom)
  - Al Roker as The Pirate Who Likes Sunsets and Kittens (United States)
- Mike Cooper as Admiral Cuthbert Collingwood
- David Schneider as Scarlett Morgan

Additional voices were provided by Tom Doggart, Sophie Jerrold, Sophie Laughton, Kayvan Novak, David Schaal and director Peter Lord.

== Production ==
Aardman Animations, who primarily use stop motion, extensively used computer graphics to complement and enrich the primarily stop-motion film with visual elements such as sea and scenery.

Director Peter Lord commented, "With Pirates!, I must say that the new technology has made Pirates! really liberating to make, easy to make because the fact that you can shoot a lot of green screen stuff, the fact that you can easily extend the sets with CGI, the fact that you can put the sea in there and a beautiful wooden boat that, frankly, would never sail in a million years, you can take that and put it into a beautiful CGI scene and believe it." Jeff Newitt served as co-director on the film.

=== Naming ===
For the release outside the United Kingdom, the film was retitled The Pirates! Band of Misfits, as author/screenwriter Gideon Defoe's books do not have "the same following outside of the United Kingdom", so it was not necessary to keep the original title.

Hugh Grant, the voice of the Pirate Captain, said that the studio "didn't think the Americans would like the longer title". Lord's similar response was that "some people reckoned the United Kingdom title wouldn't charm/amuse/work in the United States. Tricky to prove eh?"

Quentin Cooper of the BBC analysed the change of the title and listed several theories. One of them is that the British audience is more tolerant of the eccentricity of the British animators. Another is that the filmmakers did not want to challenge American and other international viewers who do not accept the theory of evolution. He quoted science writer Jennifer Ouellette's 2010 statement at the Science & Entertainment Exchange that scientists are undesirable in American popular culture, being represented as "the mad scientist or the dweeby nerd that dress funny, have no social skills, play video games, long for unattainable women".

=== Controversy ===
In January 2012, it was reported that the latest trailer of The Pirates! attracted some very negative reactions from the "leprosy community". In the trailer released in December 2011, the Pirate Captain lands on a ship demanding gold, but is told by a crewmember, "We don't have any gold, old man. This is a leper boat!" before his left arm falls off.

Lepra Health in Action and some officials from the World Health Organization claimed that the joke depicted leprosy in a derogatory manner, and it "reinforces the misconceptions which lead to stigma and discrimination that prevents people from coming forward for treatment". They demanded an apology and removal of the offending scene, to which Aardman responded: "After reviewing the matter, we decided to change the scene out of respect and sensitivity for those who suffer from leprosy. The last thing anyone intended was to offend anyone..."

LHA responded that it was "genuinely delighted that Aardman has decided to amend the film", while the trailer was expected to be pulled down from websites, and the final version of the film has the leprosy reference replaced with "plague", with the crewmember's line changed accordingly so that he says "This is a plague boat, old man! I'd give my right arm for some gold", and then adding "Or my left!" once his left arm falls off.

=== Music ===
The film's score was composed by Theodore Shapiro in his animated feature score debut. The score was released digitally by Madison Gate Records on 24 April 2012, and as a CD-R on-demand on 17 May 2012. The film also includes a number of previously released songs by various artists, including "Swords of a Thousand Men" by Tenpole Tudor, "Ranking Full-Stop" by The Beat, "Fiesta" by The Pogues, "London Calling" by The Clash, "You Can Get It If You Really Want" by Jimmy Cliff, "Alright" by Supergrass, and "I'm Not Crying" by Flight of the Conchords.

== Release ==
=== Home media ===
The Pirates! was released on DVD, Blu-ray, and Blu-ray 3D on 28 August 2012 in the United States, and on 10 September 2012 in the United Kingdom., The film is accompanied by an 18-minute short stop motion animated film called So You Want to Be a Pirate!, where The Pirate Captain hosts his own talk show about being a true pirate.

The short was also released on DVD on 13 August 2012, exclusively at Tesco stores in the United Kingdom. As a promotion for the release of The Pirates!, Sony attached to every DVD and Blu-ray a code to download a LittleBigPlanet 2 minipack of Sackboy clothing that represents 3 of the characters: The Pirate Captain, Cutlass Liz and Black Bellamy.

== Reception ==
=== Box office ===
The film has grossed $123,054,041 worldwide. $26 million came from United Kingdom, $31 million from the United States and Canada, along with around $92 million from other territories, including the United Kingdom. As of 2017, it is the fourth highest-grossing stop-motion animated film of all time.

In North America, it ranked fifth on its opening day, taking in $2,749,959, slightly higher than Arthur Christmas' $2.4 million opening day. The film eventually made $11.1 million on its opening weekend and reached second at the box office behind Think Like a Man while averaging $3,315 through its 3,358 theatres, on its second weekend, it dropped by 50.6%, ranking fourth with $5,502,482, then to seventh place with $3,143,442, dropping by 42.9%.

In the United Kingdom, it opened to third with $3,486,095 behind The Hunger Games and Wrath of the Titans, averaging $6,443 through its 554 cinemas, it saw a 1.3% increase on its second weekend with $3,486,280, averaging $6,240 per cinema, and bringing the UK gross to $12,251,022.

=== Critical response ===
On review aggregator Rotten Tomatoes, the film has an 87% approval rating based on 150 reviews; the average score is 7.3/10. The website's consensus reads, "It may not quite scale Aardman's customary delirious heights, but The Pirates! still represents some of the smartest, most skillfully animated fare that modern cinema has to offer." Metacritic, which assigns a weighted average score out of 100 to reviews from mainstream critics, gives the film a score of 73 based on 31 reviews, indicating "generally favourable reviews". Audiences polled by CinemaScore gave the film an average grade of "B" on an A+ to F scale. This is the lowest score that an Aardman production has ever received.

=== Accolades ===
Awards Body	Category	Recipients	Result
Academy Awards	Best Animated Feature	Peter Lord	Nominated
Annie Awards	Best Animated Feature	Julie Lockhart, Peter Lord and David Sproxton	Nominated
Annie Awards	Character Animation in a Feature Production	Will Becher	Nominated
Annie Awards	Production Design in an Animated Feature Production	Norman Garwood, Matt Berry	Nominated
Annie Awards	Voice Acting in an Animated Feature Production	Imelda Staunton	Nominated
Annie Awards	Writing in an Animated Feature Production	Gideon Defoe	Nominated
European Film Awards	Best Animated Feature Film		Nominated
Visual Effects Society	Outstanding Animated Character in an Animated Feature Motion Picture	Will Becher, Jay Grace, Loyd Price	Nominated

== Cancelled sequel ==
By August 2011, Aardman had been already working on a sequel idea and by June 2012, a story had been prepared, awaiting Sony's backing of the project. Eventually, Sony decided not to support the project due to insufficient international earnings. According to Lord, "It got close, but not quite close enough. I was all fired up for doing more. It was such fun to do! We actually have a poster for The Pirates! In an Adventure with Cowboys! That would have been just great."
