= Pirate (steamboat) =

The steamboat Pirate was an early American expeditionary supply vessel that sank on the Missouri River near what is now Bellevue, Nebraska, in April 1839 after snagging. The sinking of the steamboat was witnessed by Pierre-Jean De Smet and lamented by Joseph N. Nicollet, who was depending on its supplies for his expedition. Pirate was also carrying American Fur Company supplies for Potawatomi Indians displaced from the east, including a village led by Billy Caldwell. De Smet later mapped the location of the wreck.
