= Skyjacked (film) =

1972 disaster film directed by John Guillermin

- Theatrical release poster
- Directed by: John Guillermin
- Written by: Stanley R. Greenberg
- Based on: Hijacked; 1970 novel by David Harper
- Produced by: Walter Seltzer
- Starring: Charlton Heston; Yvette Mimieux; James Brolin; Jeanne Crain; Roosevelt Grier; Walter Pidgeon; Leslie Uggams
- Cinematography: Harry Stradling Jr.
- Edited by: Robert Swink
- Music by: Perry Botkin Jr.
- Production companies: Walter Seltzer Productions, Inc.
- Distributed by: Metro-Goldwyn-Mayer
- Release date: May 24, 1972
- Running time: 101 minutes
- Country: United States
- Language: English
- Budget: $1.7 million
- Box office: $6.55 million (rentals)

Skyjacked is a 1972 American disaster film starring Charlton Heston and Yvette Mimieux. Directed by John Guillermin, the film is based on the David Harper novel Hijacked. James Brolin led an ensemble cast primarily playing the roles of passengers and crew aboard an airliner.

Skyjacked was the last of actress Jeanne Crain's 64 films. It was the film debut for several actors and actresses, including Susan Dey and Roosevelt "Rosey" Grier.

== Plot ==
During a flight from Oakland to Minneapolis, passenger Elly Brewster aboard Global Airways Flight 502, a Boeing 707, discovers a bomb threat written in lipstick on the mirror of a first-class bathroom. Captain Hank O'Hara believes it may be a hoax, but when a second lipstick threat is left on lead stewardess Angela Thatcher's serving tray, he is convinced to follow its instructions: "Bomb on plane divert to Anchorage, Alaska. No Joke, No Tricks. Death." To avoid an explosive decompression en route, he flies at lower altitude, increasing fuel consumption.

O'Hara is not convinced by passenger Gary Brown that his erratically behaving seatmate, Sgt. Jerome K. Weber, is the hijacker. Severe storms plague the trip north and drain even more fuel. Visibility approaching the airport is so poor that United States Air Force ground-controlled approach specialist Sgt. Ben Puzo is called in. His radar shows the airliner on a collision course with a small plane with radio failure, but Flight 502 has too little fuel for a go-around. O'Hara sees the other aircraft at the last moment and avoids a collision, then is talked down safely.

Once on the ground, passengers attempt to disarm Weber, a Vietnam veteran driven insane by war trauma, but he brandishes a pistol, then fends them off. He pulls the pin from a grenade and threatens to detonate it if anyone attempts to interfere with his plans. Weber goes to the cockpit and demands the aircraft be refueled. While he is occupied there, Angela oversees the escape of the economy-class passengers by emergency slide. Weber is upset when he discovers this, but allows the other three stewardesses to leave. He keeps the remaining crew and first-class passengers as hostages, including U.S. Senator Arne Lindner and the pregnant Harriett Stevens, who has gone into premature labor.

Weber demands to be flown to Moscow, where he intends to defect to the Soviet Union. Although the Soviets deny clearance into their airspace, Weber forces the pilots to continue on. As they enter Soviet airspace, O'Hara orders the landing gear down, reduces airspeed, and broadcasts their situation to Soviet ground control. The aircraft is surrounded by aggressive Soviet fighter jets, which escort the plane to the Moscow airport. Upon landing there, the airliner is ordered to stop on a siding, where it is encircled by armed soldiers.

The remaining crew and passengers are released, leaving only O'Hara and Weber. Weber, who had nursed fantasies of being received by the Soviets as a hero, is jubilant to have seemingly achieved his dreams and gloats to O'Hara that he never had a bomb. When he realizes the Soviet forces have deployed to attack rather than welcome him, he straps on a bandolier of grenades and produces an automatic weapon. When O'Hara tries to jump him, Weber shoots him and leads him down the airstair to the landing strip. As the soldiers prepare to fire and Weber pulls a pin from a grenade, O'Hara pushes free. A fusillade follows, and Weber is cut down, then falls on his own grenade. O'Hara survives and is placed on a stretcher. Gazing skyward, he smiles with relief.

== Cast ==
- Charlton Heston as Henry O'Hara
- Yvette Mimieux as Angela Thatcher
- James Brolin as Jerome K. Weber
- Claude Akins as Sgt. Ben Puzo
- Jeanne Crain as Clara Shaw
- Susan Dey as Elly Brewster
- Roosevelt Grier as Gary Brown
- Mariette Hartley as Harriet Stevens
- Walter Pidgeon as Senator Arne Lindner
- Ken Swofford as John Bimonte
- Leslie Uggams as Lovejoy Wells
- Ross Elliott as Harold Shaw
- Nicholas Hammond as Peter Lindner
- Mike Henry as Sam Allen
- Jayson William Kane as William Reading
- Maureen Connell as Mrs. O'Hara
- John Fiedler as Robert Grundig
- John Hillerman as Walter Brandt

== Production ==
Fighters escort the hijacked airliner over Soviet airspace

Between 1961 and 1973, nearly 160 hijackings took place in American airspace. David Harper's novel Hijacked was published in 1970. Film rights were bought by Walter Seltzer. The star was Charlton Heston, who had made four films with Seltzer.

Under the working titles Hijacked and Airborne, principal photography took place from early January to early March 1972. The production obtained a World Airways Boeing 707 (N374WA) to play the part of the "Global Airways" airliner. With 90% of the filming done inside a 707 set, Heston compared his work there to what director Alfred Hitchcock had achieved in filming Lifeboat (1944). Then-current Air National Guard North American F-100 Super Sabres of the 188th Fighter Squadron were painted as the Soviet interceptors. Oakland International Airport was used for the airport scenes. Some of the Soviet soldiers at the Moscow airport are carrying American M16 rifles. The sedans are Swedish Volvo 164s.

Filming took place in early 1972. Heston wrote about the experience in his diary:

January 4: I've never done a film with so many scenes I wasn't in. Still there was the 707, all becrewed and passengered. I did get a chance to try my uniform on. I look OK...January 5:...My first scene today consisted of walking out of the cockpit and into the can. Very demanding bit of emoting there. January 20: The opening shots went well, John Guillermin utilizing his talent for richly textured full shots, most with a moving camera. He provided a good introductory scene for me. I'm beginning to realize this is not a rich role, of course. Nonetheless, if the film comes off, it'll help me. I'm beginning to think it will, too...Skyjacked looks surprisingly good, I was relieved to see...It seems very tight. A pleasure for a change to be in a film that runs under two hours...it's been some time."

== Reception ==
=== Box office ===
The film was profitable. It was one of MGM's bigger hits of 1972, along with Shaft and Kansas City Bomber.

=== Critical ===
In 2020 FilmInk called it "is a solid piece of classical entertainment which is one of the best movies made at MGM under the regime of James Aubrey...Charlton Heston was born to play a pilot."

Paul Mavis writing for Movies & Drinks in 2022 appreciated its non-glossy approach to the disaster genre: "This is a straightforward, simple, mean little suspense thriller, extremely well-told by director John Guillermin and screenwriter Stanley R. Greenberg, and unpretentiously unembellished."

== See also ==
- List of American films of 1972
