= KC Space Pirates =

The Kansas City Space Pirates 2006 team logo

The Kansas City Space Pirates 2006 climber going up the ribbon

On May 20, 2021, KC Space Pirates won one of 4 $50,000 second place prizes in phase 1 of NASA's Watts on the Moon Challenge.

KC Space Pirates competed in the 2006, 2007, and 2009 Space Elevator Games. Prize money was from the NASA Centennial Challenges Power Beaming Challenge.

The competition was put on by the Spaceward Foundation. The goal of the competition was to encourage universities and groups to research and create designs for beaming power to distant objects. For the competition Spaceward used the Space Elevator concept to make it more challenging and to help show how beamed power could work. NASA has put up the top prize of up to US$2,000,000 ($900,000 for the 2 meters/second category and $1,100,000 for the 5 meters/second category) for the 2009 competition. The 2 meters/second prize was won during the 2009 competition. The 5 m/s challenge remained open for the 2010 competition that was canceled.

The competition was in the form of a race, 1 km (3,281 ft) straight up. The climbers are unmanned, have a maximum allowed weight of 25 kg (55 lbs), and may use no fuel or batteries to climb—they must only be powered by beamed energy. So far, the top designs have been reflected sunlight and laser. The KC Space Pirates used sunlight reflected off of a large array of mirrors concentrated onto a highly efficient array of solar cells in 2006 and 2007. They switched to using an infrared laser for the 2009 competition.

The KC Space Pirates was the only 2009 team to have a fully automated laser tracking system. They did well in each competition but fell short of the money.
