= The Pirates! in an Adventure with Whaling =

Second pirate novel by Gideon Defoe

The Pirates! in an Adventure with Whaling The Pirates! in an Adventure with Ahab
- Cover art for the Hardback edition
- Author: Gideon Defoe
- Language: English
- Series: The Pirates!
- Genre: Comedy novel
- Publisher: Orion Books
- Publication date: 1 September 2005
- Publication place: United Kingdom
- Media type: Print (hardcover & paperback)
- Pages: 160 pp
- ISBN: 0-297-84901-8
- OCLC: 60512658
- Preceded by: The Pirates! in an Adventure with Scientists
- Followed by: The Pirates! in an Adventure with Communists

The Pirates! in an Adventure with Whaling (also known as The Pirates! In an Adventure with Ahab and The Pirates! In an Adventure with Moby Dick) is the second book in The Pirates! series by Gideon Defoe, published in 2005 by The Orion Publishing Group.

After The Pirates! in an Adventure with Scientists, the pirates felt that their ship needed some repair. So they go to see Cutlass Liz, the beautiful yet ferocious pirate boat yard owner, where, after much showing off, the Pirate Captain buys the most expensive boat, The Lovely Emma. Having little gold, the Pirates are unable to pay for the boat, so they go on an adventure to find 6,000 dubloons.

They go to Las Vegas, and get mixed up with Ahab, who is hunting Moby-Dick. The pirate Captain goes mad, and the Prize ham plays a major part in the whole adventure.
