= Hijacking =

Hijacking, to forcibly seize control of something, may refer to:

== Transportation ==
- Aircraft hijacking, the unlawful seizure of an aircraft by an individual or a group
- Carjacking, a robbery in which the item stolen is a motor vehicle
- Maritime hijacking, or piracy

== Computing and communications ==
- BGP hijacking, the illegitimate takeover of groups of IP addresses
- Bluejacking, the unsolicited transmission of data via Bluetooth
- Browser hijacking, unwanted software that modifies a web browser's settings
- Clickjacking, a malicious technique of tricking a user into clicking on something different to what they perceive
- DLL hijacking, attacking a dynamic-link library
- DNS hijacking, subverting the resolution of Domain Name System queries
- Domain hijacking, illegitimate changing the registration of a domain name
  - Reverse domain hijacking
- Session hijacking, exploitation of a valid computer session to gain unauthorized access

== Other examples ==
- Brandjacking, the unauthorized use of a company's brand
- Credit card fraud

== See also ==
- Hijack (disambiguation)
- Hijacked (disambiguation)
- Hijacker (disambiguation)
- A Hijacking, a 2012 Danish thriller film
