= The Pirates! In an Adventure with Scientists =

First pirate novel by Gideon Defoe

- Cover art for the Hardback edition
- Author: Gideon Defoe
- Language: English
- Series: The Pirates!
- Genre: Comedy
- Publisher: Orion Books
- Publication date: 26 August 2004
- Publication place: United Kingdom
- Media type: Print (Hardcover)
- Pages: 144 pp
- ISBN: 0-297-84885-2
- OCLC: 59264433
- Followed by: The Pirates! in an Adventure with Whaling

The Pirates! In an Adventure with Scientists is the first book in The Pirates! series by Gideon Defoe dealing with a hapless crew of pirates. It was published in 2004 by Orion Books (ISBN 0-297-84885-2). The book was adapted into a stop-motion film by Aardman Animations.

== Plot ==
The book is set in 1837, and follows the adventures of "The Pirate Captain" and his crew of unorthodox pirates. They meet a young Charles Darwin and Mister Bobo, a highly trained and sophisticated "man-panzee", who have been exiled from London by a rival scientist. Having sunk the Beagle, which he believed was a Bank of England treasure ship thanks to a tip-off from Black Bellamy, the Pirate Captain agrees to take Darwin home and help him defeat his enemies and the very evil and angry Bishop of Oxford.

== Characters ==
The Pirate Captain is arrogant, naive and mostly incompetent as a pirate and as a sea captain, but he's ultimately well-meaning and very much respected by his crew. He doesn't appear to possess any of the stereotypical pirate accoutrements, though he dresses in the traditional manner, and much is made of his luxuriant beard. He is said to have a "pleasant, open face", though he is quite successful at terrifying non-pirates. He is also – as are all the rest of his crew – rather obsessed with ham.

His pirates are never given names, only descriptions, such as "the pirate with a scarf", "the pirate in green" and "the pirate with gout". These descriptions are used consistently throughout the series for each character, and the pirates occasionally refer to each other using them, but always use "The Pirate Captain" as if it were their captain's name.

We are also introduced to Black Bellamy, the Pirate Captain's cunning and black-hearted nemesis, Jennifer, a sensible Victorian Lady who becomes an invaluable member of the crew, Charles Darwin as their helper and the mean Bishop of Oxford as the villain.

== Series ==
The book introduces many themes and devices that are revisited throughout the series, including the Pirate Captain's bizarre behaviour and ridiculous schemes; the pirates' love of ham, and in particular the Pirate Captain's prize honey-glazed ham; the relationship between the Pirate Captain and his crew; and the use of footnotes to introduce historical and scientific facts relevant to the narrative.

== Film ==
Aardman Animations in cooperation with Columbia Pictures and Sony Pictures Animation has adapted the book into a 3D stop-motion animated film released on March 28, 2012, and directed by Peter Lord, the director of Chicken Run, with the script written by the book's author Gideon Defoe. The movie replaces the Bishop of Oxford with Queen Victoria as the main villain.
