= Word of Honor =

Word of Honor or Word of Honour may refer to:

- Word of Honor (1981 film), a 1981 film co-written by David Ackles
- Word of Honor (novel), a 1985 novel by Nelson DeMille
  - Word of Honor (2003 film), a 2003 film starring Don Johnson and based on the DeMille novel
- Word of Honor (TV series), a 2021 streaming Chinese TV series adaption of the novel Tian Ya Ke by Priest
- "Word of Honor" (Gunsmoke), a 1955 television episode
- "Word of Honour" (Upstairs, Downstairs), a 1973 television episode

== See also ==
- Palabra de honor (disambiguation)
