= The General's Daughter =

The General's Daughter may refer to:

- The General's Daughter (novel), a 1992 novel by Nelson DeMille
- The General's Daughter (film), a 1999 American adaptation of DeMille's novel
- The General's Daughter (TV series), a 2019 Philippine action drama series unrelated to DeMille's novel and the film above
