= Mayday (novel) =

1979 thriller novel by Thomas Block

- First edition
- Author: Thomas Block with Nelson DeMille
- Publisher: Richard Marek Publishers
- Publication date: November 1979
- Pages: 346
- ISBN: 0-446-60476-3
- OCLC: 38146516
- Preceded by: By the Rivers of Babylon
- Followed by: Cathedral (DeMille); Orbit (Block)

Mayday is a 1979 thriller novel by American author Thomas Block. The novel was updated in 1998 by authors Thomas Block and Nelson DeMille and re-released as a paperback.

== Plot summary ==
A supersonic passenger jet flying over the Pacific Ocean is struck by an errant missile. Due to the effects of decompression and oxygen deprivation, all but a handful of the passengers are incapacitated. Three survivors must attempt to land the airplane, despite attempts to cover up the disaster.

== Film adaptation ==
Mayday was adapted in a television film that premiered on CBS-TV as a Sunday night movie on October 2, 2005. The movie stars Aidan Quinn, Gail O'Grady, Dean Cain, Charles Dutton, Michael Murphy, and Kelly Hu.

The name of the airline in the original novel was Trans-United (a possible merger between TWA and United), but was changed in the movie to Pacific Global (a fictional airline from another thriller novel, Shadow 81 by Lucien Nahum). Other differences included navy pilot Peter Matos refusing to destroy the stricken airliner and diverting to an aircraft carrier (he was originally tricked into ditching his plane at sea), Harold Stein staying on board the flight (in the novel, he committed suicide by jumping from the airliner with his wife) and insurer Wayne Metz replaced by Anne Metz.
