= The Best from Fantastic =

- Cover of first edition
- Editor: Ted White
- Language: English
- Genre: Science fiction, fantasy
- Publisher: Manor Books
- Publication date: 1973
- Publication place: United States
- Media type: Print (paperback)
- Pages: 192
- OCLC: 3967434

The Best from Fantastic is an anthology of science fiction and fantasy short stories edited by Ted White. It was first published in paperback by Manor Books in 1973, as a companion to The Best from Amazing Stories, issued in the same year. The first British edition was published in hardcover by Robert Hale in 1976.

== Summary ==
White, editor of Fantastic and Amazing Stories magazines at the time the anthology was published, here collects nine fantasy short stories and novelettes that originally appeared in Fantastic, along with one from Amazing, in the period prior to his editorship.

== Contents ==
- "Foreword" (Ted White)
- "I'm Looking for 'Jeff'" (Fritz Leiber) (from Fantastic v. 1, no. 2, Fall 1952)
- "Angels in the Jets" (Jerome Bixby) (from Fantastic v. 1, no. 2, Fall 1952)
- "Paingod" (Harlan Ellison) (from Fantastic v. 13, no. 6, Jun. 1964)
- "The Malatesta Collection" (Roger Zelazny) (from Fantastic v. 12, no. 4, Apr. 1964)
- "Sally" (Isaac Asimov) (from Fantastic v. 2, no. 3, May/Jun. 1953)
- "The Roller Coaster" (Alfred Bester) (from Fantastic v. 2, no. 3, May/Jun. 1953)
- "Eye Times Four" (Poul Anderson) (from Fantastic v. 9, no. 4, Apr. 1960)
- "Final Exam" (Chad Oliver) (from Fantastic v. 1, no. 3, Nov. 1952)
- "April in Paris" (Ursula K. Le Guin) (from Fantastic v. 11, no. 9, Sep. 1962)
- "A Trip to the City" (Keith Laumer) (from Amazing Stories v. 37, no. 1, Jan. 1963)
