= The Cannibal (DeMille novel) =

1975 novel by Nelson DeMille

- First edition (originally as Joe Keller)
- Author: Nelson DeMille
- Language: English
- Genre: Fiction
- Publisher: Manor Books
- Publication date: 1975
- Publication place: United States
- Preceded by: The Smack Man
- Followed by: The Night of the Phoenix

The Cannibal is the fifth of Nelson DeMille's novels about NYPD Sergeant Joe Ryker. It was first published in 1975 with the protagonist originally as Joe Keller. The novel was then republished in 1989 with the author listed as Jack Cannon.
