= The Smack Man =

1975 novel by Nelson DeMille

- First edition (originally as Joe Keller)
- Author: Nelson DeMille
- Language: English
- Genre: Fiction
- Publisher: Manor Books
- Publication date: 1975
- Publication place: United States
- Pages: 190
- ISBN: 9780586204597
- OCLC: 20628984
- Preceded by: The Agent of Death
- Followed by: The Cannibal

The Smack Man is the fourth of Nelson DeMille's novels about NYPD Sergeant Joe Ryker. It was first published in 1975 with the protagonist originally as Joe Keller. The book was republished in 1989 with the author listed as Jack Cannon. The novel focuses on Joe Ryker's attempt to stop a murderer from poisoning illegal drugs coming into New York City.
