= Mayday (2005 film) =

2005 American television film directed by T.J. Scott

- Film poster
- Based on: Mayday by Thomas Block with Nelson DeMille
- Teleplay by: Kevin Lund; T. J. Scott
- Directed by: T. J. Scott
- Starring: Aidan Quinn; Dean Cain; Kelly Hu; Michael Murphy
- Music by: Sean Callery
- Country of origin: United States
- Original language: English

Production
- Producer: Judy Cairo
- Cinematography: Paul Elliott
- Editor: David B. Thompson
- Running time: 120 minutes
- Production companies: Laird McMurray Film Services Inc. Chautauqua Entertainment The Jerry Leider Company; Paramount Network Television

Original release
- Network: CBS
- Release: October 2, 2005

Mayday is a 2005 American television thriller film based on the 1979 novel by American author Thomas Block. The novel was updated in 1998 by authors Thomas Block and Nelson DeMille and re-released as a paperback. The film was directed by T. J. Scott and stars Aidan Quinn, Dean Cain, Kelly Hu, Michael Murphy, Charles S. Dutton and Gail O'Grady. It aired on CBS in the United States on October 2, 2005.

== Plot ==
A state-of-the-art supersonic passenger jet is flying from San Francisco to Tokyo. At 12 miles (19.2 km) above the Pacific Ocean, the Pacific Global Flight 52 is struck by an errant U.S. Navy missile that cripples the aircraft. The missile has killed the flight crew, and left almost all of the other crew and most of the passengers dead, near death, or psychologically deranged.

A handful of survivors on the airliner must now have to achieve the impossible: to land the aircraft despite weather, intrigues and technical problems. While terror and hysteria begin to increase for those on board, John Berry (Aidan Quinn), a weekend pilot is forced to take control of the airliner and navigate it to safety. Meanwhile, the U.S. military, Anne Metz (Gail O'Grady), a representative from the insurance company and executives from the Pacific Global Airline are all working to keep the incident a secret. U.S. Navy Commander James Sloan (Dean Cain) sends Lt. Peter Matos (James Thomas) to destroy the crippled airliner, but the pilot disobeys his orders.

U.S. Navy Admiral Randolf Hennings (Charles S. Dutton) also defies his superiors and pledges to tell the true story of the accident in his report to the Pentagon. Berry and flight attendant Sharon Crandall (Kelly Hu) survive another attempt to down the aircraft and eventually manage to control the stricken airliner and bring it back to a safe landing in San Francisco.

== Cast ==
- Aidan Quinn as John Berry
- Dean Cain as Commander James Sloan
- Kelly Hu as Sharon Crandall
- Michael Murphy as Captain Randall Williams
- Charles S. Dutton as Admiral Randolf Hennings
- Gail O'Grady as Anne Metz
- Sasha Roiz as Wayne Johnson
- Richard FitzPatrick as Jack Miller
- Tamara Hope as Linda Farley
- Gabriel Hogan as Daniel McVary
- Victoria Pratt as Simms
- Ron Lea as Harold Stein
- Matt Aquin as David Henderson
- Martin Roach as Carl Fessell
- Matt Gordon as Carson Evans
- Carin Moffat as Lieutenant Robin Ballantine
- Richard Yearwood as Ensign Kyle Eggers
- Michael McLachlan as Ensign Sam Nichols
- Sarah Orenstein as Amy Stein
- Charlotte Corbeil-Coleman as Erica Stein
- Deborah Odell as Rahcel Seymour
- Jonas Chernick as Mickey King
- Vick Sahay as Talk Ito
- Mike Realba as Stuart Henderson
- Jonathan Keltz as Dough Berry
- Karen Robinson as Marlene Cobb
- Darren Hynes as Barry Townley Freeman
- Leigh Bianco as Barabara
- James Thomas as Lieutenant Peter Matos
- Katie Bergin as Lieutenant Owen
- Brian Kaulback as Ground Controller
- Bryon Mumford as Paramedic
- Jane Luk as Attendant

== Production ==
Originally developed with TNT Network for the 2003–2004 season, the Mayday project was picked up for production for the 2005-2006 CBS season. Principal photography took place in Toronto, Ontario, Canada by Chautauqua Entertainment and the Jerry Leider Co. in association with Paramount Network TV, at the Toronto Film Studios. Filming took place from July 9, 2005, with shooting completed on August 6, 2005.

== Reception ==
Mayday was reviewed by Brian Lowry for Variety; he said: "Although "Mayday" is based on a bestselling novel, it's hard to escape the distracting sense that it feels like a sober-minded update of "Airplane!," what with a weekend pilot and attractive stewardess forced to land a wounded plane filled with incapacitated passengers."
