= The Night of the Phoenix =

1975 novel by Nelson DeMille

- First edition (originally as Joe Keller)
- Author: Nelson DeMille
- Language: English
- Genre: Fiction
- Publisher: Manor Books
- Publication date: 1975
- Publication place: United States
- Preceded by: The Cannibal

The Night of the Phoenix is the sixth of Nelson DeMille's novels featuring NYPD Sergeant Joe Ryker. It was first published in 1975 with the protagonist originally as Joe Keller. It was republished in 1989 with the author listed as Jack Cannon.
