= Spencerville =

Spencerville may refer to:

== Places ==
- Spencerville, Ontario, Canada
- Spencerville, New Zealand

=== United States ===
- Spencerville, Indiana
- Spencerville, Maryland
- Spencerville Adventist Academy, Maryland
- Spencerville, New Mexico
- Spencerville, Ohio
- Spencerville, Oklahoma

== Other uses ==
- Spencerville (novel), by Nelson DeMille
- Spencerville, the fictional location of children's television program Hallo Spencer
