= The Best from Amazing Stories =

Anthology of science fiction short stories

- Cover of first edition
- Editor: Ted White
- Language: English
- Genre: Science fiction
- Publisher: Manor Books
- Publication date: 1973
- Publication place: United States
- Media type: Print (paperback)
- Pages: 192
- OCLC: 4178733

The Best from Amazing Stories is an anthology of science fiction short stories edited by Ted White. It was first published in paperback by Manor Books in 1973, as a companion to The Best from Fantastic, issued in the same year. The first British edition was published in hardcover by Robert Hale in 1976 under the alternative title The Best from Amazing.

== Summary ==
White, editor of Amazing Stories magazine at the time the anthology was published, here collects eight science fiction short stories and novelettes that originally appeared in the magazine in the period prior to his editorship.

== Contents ==
- "No Charge for Alterations" (H. L. Gold) (from Amazing Stories v. 27, no. 4, Apr./May 1953)
- "The Augmented Agent" (Jack Vance) (from Amazing Stories v. 35, no. 10, Oct. 1961)
- "The Misfit" (Roger Zelazny) (from Amazing Stories v. 37, no. 10, Oct. 1963)
- "The Dowry of Angyar" (Ursula K. Le Guin) (from Amazing Stories v. 38, no. 9, Sep. 1964)
- "Placement Test" (Keith Laumer) (from Amazing Stories v. 38, no. 7, Jul. 1964)
- "The Horn of Time the Hunter" (Poul Anderson) (from Amazing Stories v. 37, no. 9, Sep. 1963)
- "Phoenix" (Marion Zimmer Bradley and Ted White) (from Amazing Stories v. 37, no. 2, Feb. 1963)
- "Rogue Psi" (James H. Schmitz) (from Amazing Stories v. 36, no. 8, Aug. 1962)
