= The Lion's Game =

2000 novel by Nelson DeMille

- Author: Nelson DeMille
- Language: English
- Genre: Fiction, Thriller, Mystery
- Publisher: Grand Central Publishing
- Publication date: January 6, 2000
- Publication place: United States
- Media type: Print, e-book
- Pages: 677
- ISBN: 9780446608268
- OCLC: 42719934
- Preceded by: Plum Island
- Followed by: Night Fall

The Lion's Game is a 2000 novel by American author Nelson DeMille. It is the second of DeMille's novels to feature the detective John Corey, now working as a contractor for the fictional FBI Anti-Terrorist Task Force in New York City. It is a sequel to Plum Island and is followed by the 2004 book Night Fall. The book also briefly mentions events from other DeMille novels like The Charm School and The Gold Coast, that are not strictly part of the Corey-universe.

== Plot ==
"The Lion" is scheduled to land at New York's JFK Airport, where an American task force awaits the Libyan terrorist as he prepares to defect to the West. Aboard Flight 175, an incident occurs prior to subsequent events. Former NYPD officer and Task Force contract agent John Corey, along with his new partner Kate Mayfield, investigates the case across the country. Their target is an adversary described as having the cunning of a man and the bloodlust of a lion. To succeed in a conflict without rules, Corey must devise a strategy that does not rely on luck.

== Film adaptation ==
According to the official Nelson DeMille website, a movie about The Lion's Game (and Plum Island) will be released. The rights to the novel were bought by Columbia Pictures in January 2000.

== Critical reception ==
George Hackett, writer for The Press of Atlantic City, said that "for sheer suspense, there's nothing better than the opening of Nelson DeMille's latest thriller".
