= The Panther (novel) =

2012 novel by Nelson DeMille

- Author: Nelson DeMille
- Language: English
- Series: John Corey; Paul Brenner
- Genre: Thriller
- Publisher: Grand Central Publishing
- Publication date: October 16, 2012
- Publication place: United States
- Pages: 437
- ISBN: 9781455518371
- OCLC: 799881877
- Preceded by: The Lion
- Followed by: Radiant Angel

The Panther is a 2012 novel by American author Nelson DeMille. It is the sixth of DeMille's novels to feature Detective John Corey, now working as a contractor for the fictional FBI Anti-Terrorist Task Force in New York City. The novel is the sequel to The Lion. The Panther is followed by DeMille's 2015 novel, Radiant Angel. Also featured in this novel is DeMille's other fictional character, Paul Brenner, who appears as the lead character in The General's Daughter and Up Country.

== Plot ==
Anti-Terrorist Task Force agent John Corey and his wife, FBI agent Kate Mayfield have been posted overseas to Sana'a, Yemen—depicted as one of the most dangerous places in the Middle East. While there, they will be working with a small team to track down one of the masterminds behind the USS Cole bombing: a high-ranking Al Qaeda operative known as The Panther.

He's shown to be wanted for multiple terrorist acts and murders—and the US government is determined to bring him down. As latecomers to a treacherous game, John and Kate do not know the rules, the players, or the score. What they do know is that there is more to their assignment than is obviou.
