= Invasion from 2500 =

Science fiction novel

Invasion from 2500 is a science fiction novel by American writers Ted White and Terry Carr in 1964 under the pseudonym Norman Edwards. It was published by Monarch Books in August 1964.
