= The Agent of Death =

1975 novel by Nelson DeMille

- First edition
- Author: Nelson DeMille
- Language: English
- Publisher: Leisure Books
- Publication date: 1975
- Publication place: United States
- Preceded by: The Hammer of God
- Followed by: The Smack Man

The Agent of Death is the third of Nelson DeMille's novels about NYPD Sergeant Joe Ryker. It was published in 1974. The book was republished in 1989 with the DeMille pseudonym Jack Cannon as the author and The Death Squad as the title. The story focuses on Ryker's attempt to stop an unstable CIA assassin in New York City.
