= Ted White (author) =

American science fiction writer (1938–2026)

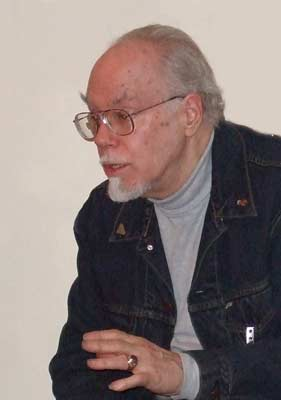
- White in 2007
- Born: Theodore Edwin White; February 4, 1938; Washington, D.C., U.S.
- Died: May 24, 2026 (aged 88)
- Occupations: Author, editor
- Spouse: Sylvia Dees (divorced)
- Writing career
- Pen name: (with Dave van Arnam) Ron Archer (with Terry Carr) Norman Edwards
- Notable work: Invasion from 2500
- Notable awards: Hugo Award for Best Fan Writer, 1968

Theodore Edwin White (February 4, 1938 – May 24, 2026) was an American science fiction writer, editor and fan, as well as a music critic. He wrote and edited as Ted White. In addition to books and stories written under his own name, he also co-authored novels with Dave Van Arnam as Ron Archer, and with Terry Carr as Norman Edwards. He won a Hugo Award in 1968.

== Author, editor, critic, and DJ ==
=== Fandom origins ===
From the time he was a teenager, White was a prolific contributor to science fiction fanzines, and in 1968 he won the Hugo Award for Best Fan Writer. His skill as an essayist is evident in "The Bet", a memoir of a tense day in 1960 when a dispute over a record owned by music critic Linda Solomon prompted fellow science fiction writer Harlan Ellison to bet his entire record collection against a single record in White's collection, and then renege on the deal.

Despite his considerable professional credits, White maintained that his achievements in fandom meant more to him than anything else he did. In 1953, he edited and published Zip, the first of many fanzines he published over the following decades. In 1956–57, he co-edited Stellar with Larry Stark, followed by Void when he joined the founding editors, Gregory Benford and James Benford (1960), Minac, Egoboo and others. In addition to helping others publish their own fanzines, he was a regular columnist in Yandro and Richard E. Geis' Psychotic/SF Review. He was also active in numerous fan events, such as organizing the 1967 World Science Fiction Convention in New York as co-chairman. As of 2018, he was still active on several of the fandom- and fanzine-oriented electronic mailing lists.

=== Radio ===
From 1977 into 1979, as Dr. Progresso, he did the Friday afternoon Dr. Progresso radio show on WGTB-FM (90.1).

=== Music critic ===
In 1959, at the age of 21, White moved from Falls Church, Virginia, to New York City with his first wife, Sylvia Dees White. That year, he began writing music criticism for Metronome and a column for Tom Wilson's Jazz Guide (later 33 Guide). As a music critic, he expanded into jazz writing and journalism for Rogue, along with LP liner notes, concert reviews and interviews. He was the only person to record an interview with Eric Dolphy (who died in 1964). Moving online, White became the music editor of the Collecting Channel website in 1999, and he maintained his own website of music commentary under his Dr. Progresso pseudonym.

=== Science fiction author ===
"Phoenix", a 1963 collaboration with Marion Zimmer Bradley, was White's first professionally published story, which he later expanded into the novel Phoenix Prime, beginning the Qanar series of books. His first novel, Invasion from 2500 (1964), was written in collaboration with Terry Carr under the pseudonym Norman Edwards. Between 1964 and 1978 he wrote two science fiction series and 11 standalone novels, including one Captain America novel. Two of the novels were written in collaboration with Dave van Arnam, one with David Bischoff and one, using White's Doc Phoenix character, with Marv Wolfman.

White was a 1966 Nebula nominee for his short story, "The Peacock King," written with Larry McCombs. He was also instrumental in kick-starting the professional careers of other writers, notably Lee Hoffman.

=== Editor ===
White held the position of assistant editor at The Magazine of Fantasy & Science Fiction from 1963 to 1968. From October 1968 until October 1978, he edited Amazing Stories and Fantastic, upgrading the quality of the fiction while showcasing a variety of talented illustrators. He also edited two 1973 anthologies, The Best from Amazing Stories and The Best from Fantastic.

His reputation as an editor impressed the publishers of Heavy Metal magazine, who hired him to introduce non-fiction and prose fiction into the magazine, which featured mainly graphic stories until White's arrival in 1979. White lasted at the helm of Heavy Metal until August 1980.

In 1985, he was an associate editor of the magazine Stardate.

=== Musician ===
White also played keyboards and saxophone. He performed with the Washington, D.C., area improvisational group Conduit.

== Death ==
White died on May 24, 2026, at the age of 88. He had suffered a fall at his home some time prior.

== Bibliography ==
=== Novels ===
- Invasion from 2500 (with Terry Carr, both writing as Norman Edwards), Monarch Books, August 1964, 126p.
- The Jewels of Elsewhen, Belmont, 1967, 172p.
- Lost in Space (with Dave van Arnam as by "Ron Archer" and Dave van Arnam) (an original novel of Lost in Space), Pyramid Books, 1967, 157p.
- Secret of the Marauder Satellite, Philadelphia, Westminster Press, 1967, 169p.
- Captain America: The Great Gold Steal, Bantam, 1968, 118p.
- Sideslip (with Dave van Arnam), Pyramid Books, 1968, 188p.
- No Time Like Tomorrow, Crown Publishers, Inc., 1969, 152p.
- By Furies Possessed, Signet, June 1970, 192p.
- Trouble on Project Ceres, Philadelphia, Westminster Press, 1971, 157p.
- Doc Phoenix. Weird Heroes #5: The Oz Encounter, (written by Marv Wolfman based on White's character), Pyramid Books, 1977, 216p.
- Forbidden World (with David Bischoff), Popular Library, ISBN 0-445-04328-8, 1978, 224p.

Android Tanner series

1. Android Avenger, Ace Double M-123 (with John Brunner's Altar of Asconel), 1965, 113p.
2. The Spawn of the Death Machine, Paperback Library, July 1968, 175p.

Qanar series

1. Phoenix Prime, Lancer Books, 1966.
2. The Sorceress of Qar, Lancer Books, 1966.
3. Star Wolf!, Lancer Books, 1971. (Part I originally appeared in the April 1971 issue of Fantastic, under the title Wolf Quest.)

=== Short fiction ===
Anthologies (edited)

- The Best from Amazing Stories, Manor Books, 1973, 192p.
- The Best from Fantastic, Manor Books, 1973, ISBN 0-532-95242-1, 192p.

Stories

Title	Year	First published	Reprinted/collected	Notes
The Philistine	2015	White, Ted (October 2015). "The Philistine". Analog Science Fiction and Fact. 135 (10): 52–58.		
