= The Cuban Affair =

2017 novel by Nelson DeMille

The Cuban Affair is Nelson DeMille's 20th novel. DeMille had earlier novels win a place on the New York Times bestseller list. According to Publishers Weekly, Simon & Schuster had scheduled its release for September 17, 2017.

On June 2, 2017, Publishers Weekly published a profile of DeMille, focused around The Cuban Affair. In that profile, DeMille traced his interest in Cuba to neighbors who were Cuban refugees he knew from his childhood. DeMille was finally able to visit Cuba in October 2015, where he was able to scout locations for the Cuban portion of the novel.

On September 5, 2017, DeMille and Alan P. Gross, who had been imprisoned in Cuba, appeared on a panel together, to discuss conditions in Cuba.

Another author, Jim Hughes, published a novel also named The Cuban Affair in 2010.

== Plot ==
The novel's protagonist is Daniel "Mac" MacCormick, a veteran who served five years in the U.S. Army as an infantry officer. Mac completed two tours of duty in Afghanistan and received the Silver Star and two Purple Hearts for his bravery. He resides in Florida, burderened with serious debt and works as a charter boat captain. As a last resort, he agreed to a covert operation by Cuban-Americans named Carlos, Eduardo and Sara Ortega to land in Cuba, and retrieve a cache of documents and funds.
