= The Gate House =

2008 novel by Nelson DeMille

- First edition
- Author: Nelson DeMille
- Language: English
- Publisher: Warner Books
- Publication date: October 28, 2008
- Publication place: United States
- Media type: Print (Hardcover)
- Pages: 688 (first edition, hardback)
- ISBN: 0-446-53342-4 (first edition, hardback)
- OCLC: 225870172
- Dewey Decimal: 813/.54 22
- LC Class: PS3554.E472 G38 2008
- Preceded by: The Gold Coast

The Gate House is a 2008 novel by American author Nelson DeMille. It is the sequel to The Gold Coast.

== Plot ==
After John Sutter's aristocratic wife killed her Mafia don lover, John left America and set out in his sailboat on a three-year journey around the world, eventually settling in London. Now, ten years later, he has come home to the Gold Coast, that stretch of land on the North Shore of Long Island that once held the greatest concentration of wealth and power in America, to attend the imminent funeral of an old family servant. Taking up temporary residence in the gatehouse of Stanhope Hall, John finds himself living only a quarter of a mile from Susan, his aristocratic ex-wife, who has also returned to Long Island. But Susan isn't the only person from John's past who has reemerged: Though Frank Bellarosa, infamous Mafia don and Susan's ex-lover, is long dead, his son, Anthony, is alive and well, and intent on two missions: Drawing John back into the violent world of the Bellarosa family, and exacting revenge on his father's murderer—Susan Sutter. At the same time, John and Susan's mutual attraction resurfaces and old passions begin to reignite, and John finds himself pulled deeper into a familiar web of seduction and betrayal. In The Gate House, acclaimed author Nelson DeMille brings us back to that fabled spot on the North Shore—a place where past, present, and future collides with often unexpected results.

== Release details ==
- 2008, USA, Grand Central Publishing (ISBN 0-446-53342-4), 28 October 2008, Hardback
