= The Hammer of God (DeMille novel) =

1974 novel by Nelson DeMille

- First edition
- Author: Nelson DeMille
- Genre: Fiction
- Publisher: Leisure Books
- Publication date: 1974
- Pages: 223
- ISBN: 0671632094
- OCLC: 21025729
- Preceded by: The Sniper
- Followed by: The Agent of Death

The Hammer of God is the second of Nelson DeMille's novels about NYPD Sergeant Joe Ryker. It was published in 1974; the book was republished in 1989 with Jack Cannon listed as the author.
