= The Lion (DeMille novel) =

2010 novel by Nelson DeMille

- First edition
- Author: Nelson DeMille
- Language: English
- Genre: Fiction
- Publisher: Grand Central Publishing
- Publication date: May 20, 2010
- Publication place: United States
- Pages: 437
- ISBN: 9780446580830
- OCLC: 464589699
- Preceded by: Wild Fire
- Followed by: The Panther

The Lion is a 2010 novel by American author Nelson DeMille. It is the fifth of DeMille's novels to feature Detective John Corey, now working as a contractor for the fictional FBI Anti-Terrorist Task Force in New York City. The novel is the sequel to The Lion's Game. The Lion is followed by DeMille's 2012 novel, The Panther.
