= Wild Fire (novel) =

2006 novel by Nelson DeMille

- Author: Nelson DeMille
- Language: English
- Genre: Fiction
- Publisher: Warner Books
- Publication date: November 6, 2006
- Publication place: United States
- Pages: 528
- ISBN: 978-0446617772
- OCLC: 70291934
- Dewey Decimal: 813/.54 22
- LC Class: PS3554.E472 W55 2006
- Preceded by: Night Fall
- Followed by: The Lion

Wild Fire is a 2006 novel by American author, Nelson DeMille. It is the fourth of DeMille's novels to feature Detective John Corey, now working as a contractor for the fictional FBI Anti-Terrorist Task Force in New York City. The novel is the sequel to Night Fall and takes place approximately one year later. Wild Fire is followed by DeMille’s 2010 novel, The Lion.

== Plot ==
Welcome to the Custer Hill Club—a men’s club set in a luxurious Adirondack hunting lodge whose members include some of America’s most powerful business leaders, military men, and government officials. Ostensibly, the club is a place to relax with old friends. But one fall weekend, the club’s Executive Board gathers to talk about the tragedy of 9/11—and finalize a retaliation plan, known only by its codename: Wild Fire.

That same weekend, a member of the Federal Anti-Terrorist Task Force is found dead. Soon it’s up to Detective John Corey and his wife, FBI Agent Kate Mayfield, to unravel a terrifying plot that starts with the Custer Hill Club and ends with American cities locked in the crosshairs of a nuclear device. Corey and Mayfield are the only ones who can stop the button from being pushed, and global chaos from being unleashed...
