= The Talbot Odyssey =

1984 novel by Nelson DeMille

- Author: Nelson DeMille
- Language: English
- Genre: Fiction
- Publisher: Delacorte Press
- Publication date: 1984
- Publication place: United States
- Pages: 422
- ISBN: 9780385293228
- OCLC: 10163038

The Talbot Odyssey is a 1984 novel by American author Nelson DeMille.

== Plot ==
Tony Abrams, a former police detective who served at the NYPD's Intelligence Division, is working as the office's investigator for the O'Brien, Kimberly, and Rose law firm of New York. He stumbles upon a swirl of intrigue that leads to discovery that for over forty years there is an active mole, code-named Talbot, within the CIA.

Talbot's mission is to carry out a secret plan devised by rogue elements in the USSR government, to attack the United States with a first-strike weapon, an unprecedented attack that would cause a mortal blow to the country. It is up to Abrams and the lawyer Katherine Kimberly to stop him.
