= Night Fall (novel) =

Book by Nelson DeMille

- First edition
- Author: Nelson DeMille
- Publisher: Warner Books
- Publication date: November 22, 2004
- Pages: 496
- ISBN: 0-446-57663-8
- OCLC: 55124504
- Dewey Decimal: 813/.54 22
- LC Class: PS3554.E472 N54 2004
- Preceded by: The Lion's Game
- Followed by: Wild Fire

Night Fall is a 2004 novel by American author Nelson DeMille.

== Plot ==
The story begins with the 1996 crash of TWA Flight 800 off Long Island, New York. A couple conducting an illicit affair on the beach witness the crash and flee the scene, having accidentally videotaped the crash and what appears to be a missile rising from the ocean towards the plane.

Five years later, Anti-Terrorist Task Force (ATTF, a fictional FBI department based on the Joint Terrorism Task Force) detective John Corey is encouraged to reinvestigate the crash by his wife Kate Mayfield, who had worked on the original investigation, which was officially blamed on mechanical failure.

The story is a sequel to The Lion's Game and reintroduces a number of characters from that novel. A sequel to Night Fall, titled Wild Fire, was released on November 6, 2006. One of the returning characters from The Lion's Game and Plum Island is CIA operative Ted Nash, whom DeMille has developed into Corey's antagonist and nemesis in his career with the ATTF.

Much of the action in the novel centers on the search for the couple who inadvertently videotaped the in-air explosion that brought down TWA Flight 800 off the coast of Long Island. At the center of Corey's investigation are witness statements claiming that the fatal explosion was caused by a missile and not by mechanical failure.

Corey is warned by his superiors not to look into the TWA crash, and he and his wife are temporarily assigned to anti-terrorist activities in Yemen and Tanzania to keep them from pursuing the case. They return to the U.S., however, in early September 2001, and Corey makes crucial discoveries which are quickly overshadowed by the events of September 11, 2001.

== Release ==
Night Fall debuted as number one on the New York Times Best Seller List on December 12, 2004, and remained on the list for 11 weeks.
