= Radiant Angel =

2015 novel by Nelson DeMille

- Author: Nelson DeMille
- Language: English
- Genre: Fiction
- Published: May 26, 2015, Grand Central Publishing
- Publication place: United States
- Pages: 311
- ISBN: 9780446580854
- OCLC: 890625614
- Preceded by: The Panther

Radiant Angel is a 2015 novel by American author Nelson DeMille. It is the seventh of DeMille's novels to feature Detective John Corey, now working as a contractor for the fictional FBI Anti-Terrorist Task Force in New York City. The novel is the sequel to The Panther. Radiant Angel debuted as No. 1 on the New York Times Best Seller list. It was released in England as A Quiet End.

In the plot, ex-NYPD Homicide Detective John Corey once again finds himself on the East End of Long Island attempting to tackle the threat of a Russian made nuclear bomb posed to annihilate the island of Manhattan.
