= Battle: Los Angeles =

2011 film by Jonathan Liebesman

- Theatrical release poster
- Directed by: Jonathan Liebesman
- Written by: Chris Bertolini
- Produced by: Neal H. Moritz; Ori Marmur
- Starring: Aaron Eckhart; Michelle Rodriguez; Ramon Rodriguez; Bridget Moynahan; Ne-Yo; Michael Peña
- Cinematography: Lukas Ettlin
- Edited by: Christian Wagner
- Music by: Brian Tyler
- Production companies: Columbia Pictures; Relativity Media; Original Film
- Distributed by: Sony Pictures Releasing
- Release dates: March 8, 2011 (Westwood); March 11, 2011 (United States)
- Running time: 116 minutes
- Country: United States
- Language: English
- Budget: $70 million
- Box office: $212 million

Battle: Los Angeles (Note: Also known as Battle: LA, stylised as Battle Los Angeles in the opening sequence, and internationally as World Invasion: Battle Los Angeles) is a 2011 American military science fiction action film directed by Jonathan Liebesman and written by Chris Bertolini. The film stars Aaron Eckhart, Michelle Rodriguez, Ramon Rodriguez, Bridget Moynahan, Ne-Yo, and Michael Peña. The film follows a Marine staff sergeant who leads a platoon of U.S. Marines, joined by other stranded military personnel, defending Los Angeles from an alien invasion.

The film was a co-production of Columbia Pictures, Relativity Media, producers Neal H. Moritz and Ori Marmur's Original Film, and distributed by Sony Pictures Releasing. The film won the BMI TV Music Award for composer Brian Tyler. The film score was orchestrated by Tyler in conjunction with the Hollywood Studio Symphony. The soundtrack was released by the Varèse Sarabande music label on March 8, 2011.

Principal photography began in September 2009, and the film was released in the United States on March 11, 2011. It grossed $212 million worldwide against a production budget of around $70–77 million, and received mostly negative reviews from critics. It was released on DVD and Blu-ray on June 14, 2011.

== Plot ==
On August 12, 2011, hostile alien spacecraft make landings off the coasts of large cities. Los Angeles is evacuated while Marines from Camp Pendleton arrive, including Staff Sergeant Michael Nantz, an Iraq War veteran. Nantz, who was to begin his retirement, is assigned to the 1st Platoon, Echo Company, of the 2nd Battalion, 5th Marines.

Under the command of 2nd Lieutenant William Martinez, the platoon arrives at a forward operating base (FOB) established at Santa Monica Airport. The alien ground forces have no apparent air support while using rapid dominance. Hence, the Air Force prepares a carpet bombing of the Santa Monica area, and the platoon is given three hours to retrieve civilians from a police station. As they advance through Los Angeles, they are ambushed and suffer multiple casualties. Nantz takes Marines Imlay and Harris to look for Lenihan, who is missing from the group. After fighting off an alien, they team up with some soldiers from the Army's 40th Infantry Division and an Air Force intelligence technical sergeant, Elena Santos. At the police station, the makeshift platoon finds five civilians: veterinarian Michele, children Kirsten, Amy, Hector, and Hector's father Joe. A helicopter arrives to evacuate wounded Marines but cannot take on the weight of the civilians. During takeoff, it is destroyed by alien air units, killing Grayston, Guerrero, Lenihan, and Simmons.

The Marines commandeer an abandoned transit bus for the evacuation. En route, they deduce that the alien air units are drones that target human radio transmissions; Santos reveals that her mission is to locate and destroy the aliens' command center controlling the drones. When their bus comes under attack by aliens on an elevated freeway, the Marines rappel the group to street level. In the ensuing battle, Marines Stavrou and Mottola and the remainder of the California Army National Guard soldiers are killed, while both Joe and Lieutenant Martinez are wounded. Martinez uses his radio to attract the aliens, then detonates explosives, sacrificing himself for his team. Nantz is now in command of surviving personnel Santos, Imlay, Kerns, Lockett, Harris, Adukwu, and the civilians, continuing their escape from the bombing zone. A scientist speculates on news media that the aliens seek Earth's water resources for fuel while exterminating the human population.

The planned carpet bombing fails to materialize. Reaching the FOB, the Marines find it destroyed, and the military retreats from the city. The Marines plan to escort the civilians to an alternate extraction point. When Joe dies from his wounds, Nantz comforts Hector. Lockett confronts Nantz regarding his brother, a Marine who, with four others, was killed during Nantz's last tour. They come to peace when Nantz explains that he continues to think of them and recites each one's name, rank, and serial number. Nantz motivates the group to move forward to honor their fallen comrades, including Joe, for his bravery. They reach the extraction point and evacuate by helicopter.

In flight, the chopper experiences a brief loss of power. Nantz theorizes that they are flying near the alien command center, transmitting intense radio messages to its drones. He orders his unit to accompany the civilians while he stays to reconnoiter the area, but his Marines join him. Searching through sewers, they confirm the presence of a large alien vessel. Kerns radios to request missiles, which Nantz manually directs using a laser designator while the others defend his position. Kerns is killed when a drone homes in on his radio, but the Marines succeed in guiding a missile to the command module, which is destroyed. The uncontrolled drones fall from the sky, and the alien ground forces retreat.

The remaining marines—Nantz, Imlay, Lockett, Harris, Adukwu, and Santos—are evacuated to a base in the Mojave Desert, greeted as heroes. They are told that their successful plan has been transmitted to the militaries battling alien forces in other cities, that Michele and the three children were rescued, and that they can now rest. Instead, they re-arm and depart to retake Los Angeles.

== Cast ==
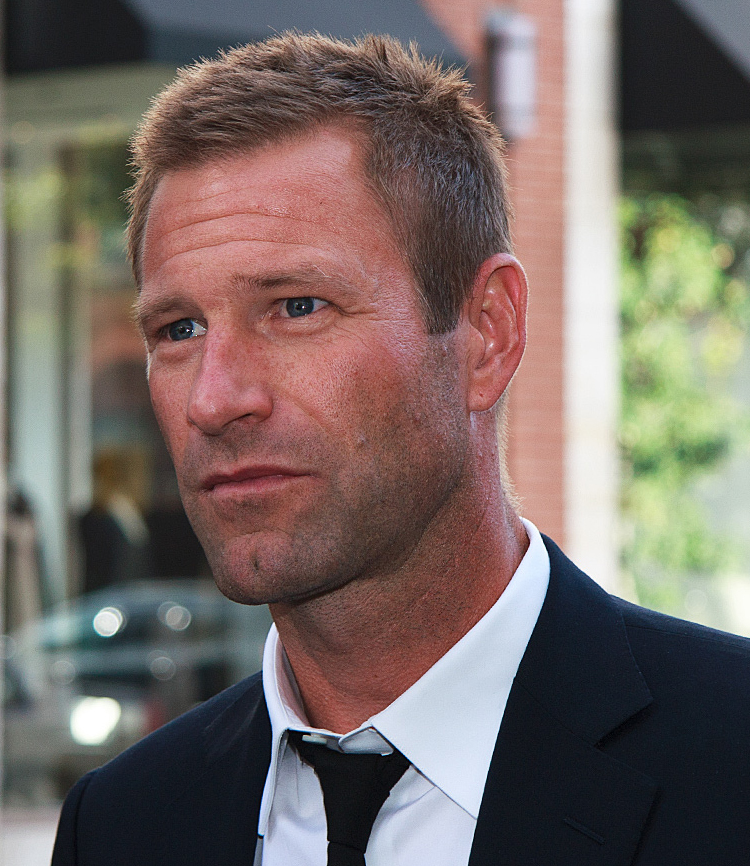
Aaron Eckhart portrayed United States Marine Corps Staff Sergeant Michael Nantz

- Aaron Eckhart as United States Marine Corps Staff Sergeant Michael Nantz
- Michelle Rodriguez as United States Air Force Technical Sergeant Elena Santos, 1st Force, 61 Air Base Wing
- Ne-Yo as United States Marine Corps Corporal Kevin J. "Specks" Harris
- Bridget Moynahan as Michele
- Michael Peña as Joe Rincon
- Cory Hardrict as United States Marine Corps Corporal Jason "Cochise" Lockett
- Jim Parrack as United States Marine Corps Lance Corporal Peter J. "Irish" Kerns
- Gino Anthony Pesi as United States Marine Corps Corporal Nick C. "Stavs" Stavrou
- Lucas Till as United States Marine Corps Corporal Scott Grayston
- Ramon Rodriguez as United States Marine Corps 2nd Lieutenant William Martinez, 1st Platoon
- Noel Fisher as United States Marine Corps Private First Class Shaun "Casper" Lenihan
- Adetokumboh M'Cormack as United States Navy Hospital Corpsman Second Class Jibril A. "Doc" Adukwu
- Will Rothhaar as United States Marine Corps Corporal Lee "Cowboy" Imlay
- Neil Brown Jr. as United States Marine Corps Corporal Richard "Motown" Guerrero
- Taylor Handley as United States Marine Corps Lance Corporal Corey Simmons
- James Hiroyuki Liao as United States Marine Corps Lance Corporal Steven "Motorolla" Mottola
- Joey King as Kristen
- Bryce Cass as Hector Rincon
- Jadin Gould as Amy

== Production ==
=== Development ===
Jonathan Liebesman intended the film to be a realistic depiction of an alien invasion in the style of a war film, taking inspiration from the films Black Hawk Down, Saving Private Ryan, and United 93 for his documentary style of filming. Liebesman also drew inspiration from YouTube videos of Marines fighting in Fallujah for the look of the film. As a result, the film was not shot in 3D as the director felt that combined with the handheld camera style of shooting would make the audience "throw up in two minutes." Instead, standard film was used, intercutting footage from three different cameras. The filmmakers tested shooting the film digitally on a Red camera, but found the camera could not capture the same quality image as standard film. The film was shot for a PG-13 rating, as the director felt making the film overly gory did not suit the more suspenseful tone they were trying to achieve. Screenwriter Chris Bertolini tried to include humour and suspense as well as action, which he felt were important elements to help draw the audience into the drama. In an interview with IGN, Liebesman described the interaction between actors, as well as the natural development of the film during pre-production exclaiming, "What comes out of that is a lot of tiny little details and tiny things that these guys bring out." He also noted, "Whether it's, just off the top of my head, Ne-Yo, who plays Harris, and Gino [Pesi], who plays Stavrou, have a great relationship, a lot of which they made up behind the scenes. Just little things, characters that you thought, 'Ah, s--t this wasn't really in the script.' These guys, like Guerrero (Neil Brown Jr.). He's one of the guys way back there but he's got a personality and he brought it and it was just stuff you don't expect."

=== Themes and analysis ===
The film's story was partly inspired by the Battle of Los Angeles, a rumored enemy attack and subsequent anti-aircraft artillery barrage that took place in Los Angeles during World War II, on the night of February 24, 1942. The incident occurred a day after the Bombardment of Ellwood when an Imperial Japanese submarine launched shells at US aviation fuel tanks; West-coast tensions were already running high in the months after the December 1941 Pearl Harbor Attack and entry of the US into World War II. Eyewitnesses and radar data reported an unknown aerial craft over the Los Angeles area on February 24, leading to fears of a Japanese attack on the US mainland. But a review of the incident found no proof of Japanese presence in the area and attributed the incident to an overreaction by US military forces. In later years, UFO investigators speculated the aircraft spotted on the night was an extraterrestrial craft.

This real incident was used as the main focus of an early teaser trailer to promote the film, in which it is strongly implied the alien invaders spent decades planning their attack and invasion. The filmmakers drew upon this historical event in an attempt to help ground the film in reality. Aaron Eckhart said that the objective of the film was to make as realistic an alien invasion movie as possible; "The goal was: this is a war movie, a documentary-style war movie—with aliens in it." The film, however, was not the first motion picture to touch upon the events surrounding the tale of the Pacific air raids. In 1979, the comedy drama film 1941 directed by Steven Spielberg, alluded to the 1942 shelling as well as other surprise military engagements. On March 12, 2011, a day after the official release for Battle: Los Angeles, a mockbuster produced by the independent film company The Asylum, entitled Battle of Los Angeles, premiered on the Syfy cable TV channel in the United States.

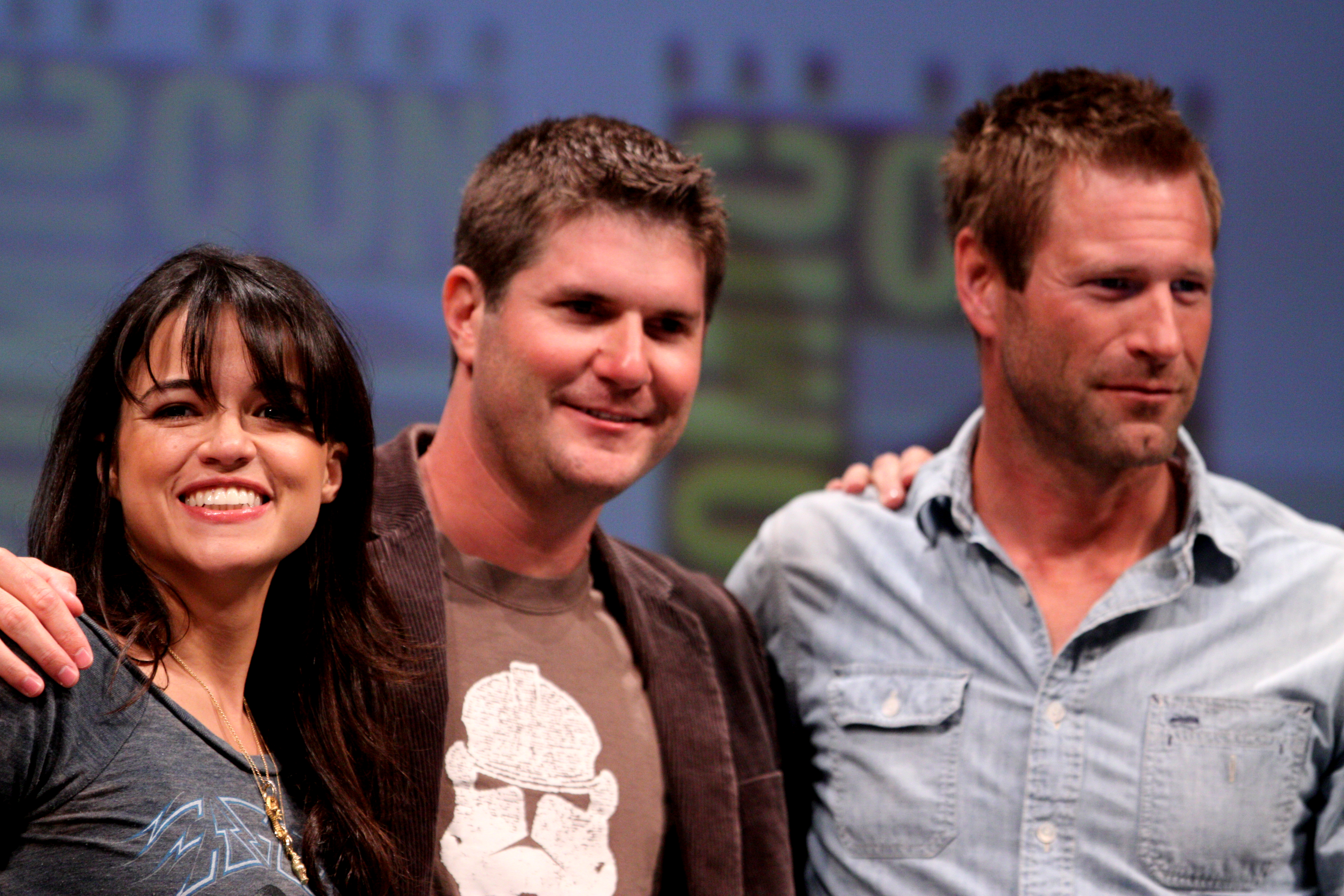
Michelle Rodriguez (left) and Aaron Eckhart (right), along with director Jonathan Liebesman at the 2010 San Diego Comic-Con.

=== Filming ===
Filming took place from September 2009 through December 2009 in Shreveport and Baton Rouge, Louisiana (with some scenes filmed at Camp Pendleton in San Diego, California). Louisiana was chosen instead of Los Angeles mainly due to financial advantages. Principal photography began in the second week of September in Shreveport with scenes depicting a destroyed interstate filled with cars, an overturned tanker truck, and a crashed helicopter. Post-production lasted throughout 2010 and into 2011. Special effects used in the principal photography included pyrotechnics. The most climactic of all was a large fireball-producing explosion which was said to have alarmed some residents and passers-by. Film crews used a large "green-screen" billboard at the base (end) of the "destroyed" interstate to use later for inserting CGI images of Los Angeles. The actors went through three weeks of boot camp, in order to learn how to realistically operate as a Marine platoon. In addition, Eckhart had done training with the Marines for a few months beforehand in weapons training and drills. On set, military technical advisors worked with the actors to ensure they gave a realistic performance. Eckhart broke his upper arm when he fell off a ledge during an action sequence, but continued to work for the remainder of the film without having it put in a cast.

There was military support for filming. Numerous Marine units assisted in filming, including infantry from 2nd Bn 7th Marines, 2nd Battalion, 1st Marines, MV-22 Ospreys from VMMT-204 (based at Marine Corps Air Station New River in North Carolina), CH-46 Sea Knights from HMM-268 and HMM-774 (based in Camp Pendleton and Naval Station Norfolk, respectively), and reservists from 3rd Battalion, 23rd Marines based in Belle Chasse, Louisiana.

=== Visual effects ===
While Liebesman tried to use practical effects whenever possible (although green screen and CGI were used), such as for explosions, 90% of the aliens are computer-generated, as the director felt they would be too difficult to achieve any other way. The invaders were designed by Paul Gerrard, who made them to appear "very alien", neither arthropod nor vertebrate, while Liebesman described them as "genocidal Nazis... They look at us like we look at ants." Liebesman wanted the aliens to appear to function as a real army, complete with medics and different ranking officers, and using tactics such as taking cover to protect themselves. Liebesman also confirmed that the aliens are invading for the Earth's natural resources, specifically because the Earth is 70% covered with water.

=== Legal dispute ===
Sony investigated the possibility of legal action against the filmmakers Greg and Colin Strause, who were hired to do visual effects work on Battle: Los Angeles through their special effects company Hydraulx. Sony suspected the Strause brothers had created their own Los Angeles–based alien invasion film Skyline, which would compete with the Battle: Los Angeles release, by using resources they had gained while working on the film without the consent of Sony Pictures. A spokesman for the Strauses responded by saying, "Any claims of impropriety are completely baseless. This is a blatant attempt by Sony to force these independent filmmakers to move a release date that has long been set by Universal and Relativity and is outside the filmmakers' control." Sony initiated arbitration against Hydraulx and the Strause brothers, but later dismissed the arbitration.

=== Music and soundtrack ===
The score was composed and conducted by Brian Tyler and performed by the Hollywood Studio Symphony. The soundtrack for the film released on March 8, 2011, by Varèse Sarabande. A song used in the trailer is "The Sun's Gone Dim and the Sky's Turned Black" by Jóhann Jóhannsson. "California Love" by 2Pac featuring Dr. Dre and Roger Troutman was used in the film but not included on the soundtrack album.

== Release ==
=== Premiere and theatrical release ===
The film had its world premiere in the United States on March 11, 2011. The next day, on March 12, it premiered in the Asia Pacific region in Taiwan. Other European markets in Germany and Denmark had the film premiering on April 14. The film made its debut in Sweden on April 20 and Switzerland on April 22. It went into general theatrical release in Latin America in Argentina on March 10. Certain Middle Eastern markets; the United Arab Emirates and Lebanon saw the premiere of the film on March 10, while in South Africa it screened later in the month on March 25.

=== Video game ===
A first-person shooter video game developed by Saber Interactive subsidiary Live Action Studios and published by Konami was released for Steam and Xbox Live Arcade on March 11, 2011, and for the PlayStation Network on March 22. The OnLive game service (as part of its Playpack subscription service) was made available to subscribers on March 15. Eckhart reprised his role for the game. Players assume the role of Corporal Lee Imlay throughout the game.

=== Home media ===
Battle: Los Angeles was released on home media on June 14, 2011, by Sony Pictures Home Entertainment.

Following its cinematic release in theaters, the Region 1 Code widescreen edition of the film was released on DVD by Sony Pictures Home Entertainment in the United States on June 14, 2011. Special features for the DVD include; Behind The Battle, Building the Aliens, Acting with Aliens, Shooting the Aliens, Preparing for Battle, and Creating L.A. in LA. Additionally, a combo two-disc Blu-ray Disc/DVD was also released on June 14, 2011. Special features for the DVD/Blu-ray Disc pack include, in addition to those present on the DVD release, a PlayStation 3 theme, The Freeway Battle, Command Control, Staff Sergeant Nantz, Marine Behind The Scenes, Aliens Ambush The Marines, Battling Unknown Forces, Technical Sergeant Santos, Alien Autopsy, Gas Station Explosion, Visual FX on the Freeway, Do You Believe in Aliens?, and Alien Command & Control.

Concurrently, the widescreen hi-definition Blu-ray version of the film was also released on June 14, 2011. Special features include, in addition to those present on the other two releases, a Resistance 3 game demo. A supplemental viewing option for the film in the media format of video on demand is available as well.

Battle: Los Angeles is one of the first titles to be re-mastered in the ultra-high resolution format 4K.

== Reception ==
=== Critical response ===
Review aggregator Rotten Tomatoes gave the film a rating of 37% based on 214 reviews, with an average rating of 4.9/10. The site's critical consensus reads, "Overlong and overly burdened with war movie clichés, Battle: Los Angeles will entertain only the most ardent action junkies." Review aggregator Metacritic assigned the film a weighted average score of 37 out of 100, based on 35 critics, indicating "generally unfavorable" reviews. Audiences polled by CinemaScore gave the film an average grade of "B" on an A+ to F scale.

Noted film critic Roger Ebert panned Battle: Los Angeles in a lengthy review, calling the movie "noisy, violent, ugly and stupid", giving the film a mere half star rating. Though he praised Aaron Eckhart's performance, Ebert heavily criticized the film's writing, effects designs, camerawork and editing. He closed his review by saying, "When I think of the elegant construction of something like Gunfight at the O.K. Corral, I want to rend the hair from my head and weep bitter tears of despair. Generations of filmmakers devoted their lives to perfecting techniques that a director like Jonathan Liebesman is either ignorant of, or indifferent to. Yet he is given millions of dollars to produce this assault on the attention span of a generation." Anthony Lane of The New Yorker gave the film a better review only by comparing it to films that were worse, stating: "Battle: Los Angeles is a lot more fun than bludgeoning, soul-draining follies like Terminator Salvation or the Transformers films."

Battle: Los Angeles was largely given poor reviews by the Los Angeles Times, The New York Times, USA Today, Entertainment Weekly, and Variety. One stand out, the San Francisco Chronicle, gave it a sympathetic review. Kim Newman of Empire rated the film 2 stars out of 5, conceding that the combat scenes were good, but criticizing its lack of originality, writing "Things blow up good and Eckhart is a classier actor than his role warrants, but we've all been here before." Nigel Floyd of Time Out rated the film 2 stars saying that it "... lumbers the flat military characters with hackneyed dialogue and corny sentimentality".

Neil Smith of Total Film magazine rated the film as 3 stars out of 5 and summarized, "Imagine Black Hawk Down with ET's instead of Somalis and you'll have the measure of an explosive if functional actioner that will do while we're waiting for summer's big guns to arrive". Movie critic Michael Phillips of the Chicago Tribune also rated the film 3 out of 5 stars, remarking how the story was "gratifyingly narrow: It's about a handful of people trying to get a handful of blocks to a safe zone on the west side of LA, and not get killed in the process. The saving-the-world part is almost an afterthought." In mild positive sentiment, Ty Burr of The Boston Globe emphatically stated that the film was a "loud, frenetic, viscerally gripping two-hour tour of duty that mostly plays fair by the rules of the genre and mostly avoids macho posturing." Similarly, Connie Ogle of the Miami Herald deduced that Battle: Los Angeles was "not so goofy as Independence Day, not so terrifying as War of the Worlds, and it utterly lacks the imagination and emotional resonance of District 9" but was a "solid popcorn movie, with plenty of action, explosions and low-key mayhem unlikely to scar even the most fragile of psyches." In his review for The Arizona Republic, critic Bill Goodykoontz called the film "good, dumb fun." Michael Phillips wrote in the Chicago Tribune, "Original, it's not. Exciting, it is. This jacked-up B-movie hybrid of Black Hawk Down and War of the Worlds is a modest but crafty triumph of tension over good sense and cliche."

=== Accolades ===
Battle: Los Angeles received an award nomination for actor Peña in the category of Favorite Movie Actor, along with a nomination for Rodriguez for Favorite Movie Actress from the ALMA Awards. Additionally, composer Tyler won the BMI TV Music Award for his work on the film.

=== Box office ===
Battle: Los Angeles debuted on March 11, 2011, in the United States screening at 3,417 theaters. It grossed $13,399,310 on its opening day, which was the best opening-day gross for 2011 until the record was surpassed by Fast Five. Overall, the film made $35,573,187 and ranked number one on its opening weekend ahead of Red Riding Hood and Mars Needs Moms. The film dropped to No. 2 after a week when Rango topped the box office on St. Patrick's Day. During its final week in release, Battle: Los Angeles opened in a distant 46th place with $68,843 in revenue. At the end of its run in 2011, the film has grossed $83,552,429 in the United States and Canadian markets and $128,266,925 in international markets, for a worldwide total of $211,819,354.

=== Awards and nominations ===
Year	Award	Category	Nominee	Result
2011	ALMA Award	Favorite Movie Actress - Drama/Adventure	Michelle Rodriguez	Nominated
2011	ALMA Award	Favorite Movie Actor	Michael Peña	Nominated
2011	BMI TV Music Award		Brian Tyler	Won
2011	Rondo Statuette	Best Film	Jonathan Liebesman	Nominated
2012	CinEuphoria Award	Best Special Effects (Sound or Visual) - International Competition	Battle: Los Angeles	Nominated

== Rumored sequel ==
In 2011, Aaron Eckhart talked about the possibility of a sequel, which Jonathan Liebesman also mentioned in a 2012 interview.
