= Plum Island (novel) =

1997 novel

- First edition
- Author: Nelson DeMille
- Language: English
- Genre: Fiction
- Publisher: Warner Books
- Publication date: April 1, 1997
- Publication place: United States
- Pages: 511
- ISBN: 9780446679084
- OCLC: 36277962
- Dewey Decimal: 813/.54 21
- LC Class: PS3554.E472 P57 1997
- Followed by: The Lion's Game

Plum Island is a 1997 novel by American author Nelson DeMille. This is the first novel to feature recurring character detective John Corey. Plum Island is followed by the 2000 novel The Lion's Game.

== Plot ==
In 1997, NYPD homicide detective John Corey is convalescing at his uncle's waterfront home on the North Fork of Long Island after surviving a line-of-duty murder attempt. As he convalesces, the local police chief, Sylvester “Max” Maxwell, asks Corey to act as consultant in a local murder investigation, paying a nominal salary of $1 per week.

Corey is personally acquainted with the two victims, Tom and Judy Gordon, both Ph.D.-level employees on the Plum Island Animal Disease Center, a facility suspected of conducting biological warfare research. Corey and Maxwell arrive to the Gordon residence, a waterfront property that appears to have been robbed or searched, and where the two victims have been shot in the head on their own dock. Corey concludes that the victims were shot at close range and presumably knew their killer. Corey and assigned Southold Town Police Department Detective Elizabeth “Beth” Penrose cannot find the slugs, but by the direction of the wounds conclude that the bullets are in the bay. Corey, from the outset, ignores Beth and searches the speed boat that the Gordons temporary docked. When he gets out of the boat she pulls his own gun on him and makes him state who he is. Just before he goes, he asks if they found the chest in the boat that the Gordons used as a trunk while boating; they reply that it's missing. Corey goes to the local bar and orders junk food. He is watching the game as Beth comes in. She invites him to come back to the Gordon house with her to see the government agents involved.

They return to the crime scene and go into the kitchen, where they meet George Foster, an FBI agent, and Ted Nash, who claims to represent the Department of Agriculture but whom Corey immediately recognises as a CIA agent due to being at a crime scene at the late hour. They discuss theories of the deaths, such as the Gordons trading the deadly diseases to which they have access for money and using the boat chest as a container for the items. The TV shows news coverage of the murder and exaggerates the importance of the Gordons' work. Corey silently dislikes how the reporter exaggerates it because there is no public evidence of the work connecting them to biological warfare or theft. Corey is jealous of Beth liking Ted Nash. The two clash over who is the alpha male of the room. Beth, Corey, and Max are able to make Ted cave in to letting them go on Plum Island the next day. Corey then goes through the Gordons' book shelves and pulls out a map of the local boating water. He notices a mysterious code written on one of the pages.

The next day he arrives early at the ferry station and sees George and Ted with the security director and other people in suits coming off the ferry, confirming his thoughts of a cover up. They do not see him and he gets on the ferry to Plum Island with the rest of the group from the previous night with Paul Stevens, the security director, who pretends he doesn't know Foster or Nash. They are brought to the island and given a bus tour. The group then walk through the long hallways with the head of the research center who has some humor, but seems to be scripted. The group meets a few scientists who are friends of Tom and Judy who were directing a project. The scientists also act like they are on a script and give cover up theories that suggest that the Gordons were underpaid government workers who stole a vaccine so they could "discover" it elsewhere and become rich and famous.

Ultimately, the killer is proven to be Frederick Tobin, owner of a local winery, whose motive was financial.
