= Up Country =

2002 novel by Nelson DeMille

- First edition
- Author: Nelson DeMille
- Language: English
- Series: Paul Brenner
- Genre: Thriller
- Publisher: Warner Books
- Publication date: 2002
- Publication place: United States
- Media type: Hardcover, paperback, audiobook
- Pages: 706
- ISBN: 9780446611916
- OCLC: 46976453
- Dewey Decimal: 813/.54 21
- LC Class: PS3554.E472 U6 2002
- Preceded by: The General's Daughter
- Followed by: The Panther

Up Country is a 2002 thriller novel by American author Nelson DeMille. It is the second novel featuring protagonist Paul Brenner.

== Plot ==
One of the last things that Chief Warrant Officer Paul Brenner wanted to do was return to work for the U.S. Army's Criminal Investigation Division, an organization that thanked him for his many years of dedicated service by forcing him into early retirement. But when his former boss calls in a career's worth of favors, Paul finds himself having to do the last thing he ever wanted-return to Vietnam.

His mission: Investigate a murder that took place during the war, thirty years before. But almost as soon as he returns to Vietnam, a country that still haunts him, he discovers that there is much more to this investigation than a forgotten murder. Brenner, former combat veteran, again finds himself in a battle for survival as he enters a world of corruption and double-crosses, where, for the second time in his life, he cannot distinguish friend from foe, and where his only allies are his wits and his bravery-and possibly a beautiful American expatriate named Susan Weber. She, like the country in which she has chosen to live, is exotic, sensual, and quite possibly dangerous.
