= Christopher Bertolini =

American film producer, writer

- Born: United States
- Other name: Chris Bertolini
- Occupations: Film writer, producer
- Spouse: Michele Bertolini (m. 1990)
- Children: 2

Christopher Bertolini is an American film writer and producer who is known for writing screenplays for Battle: Los Angeles. and The General's Daughter.

== Personal life ==
Bertolini has two children, a daughter named Georgia, born on December 20, 1989, and a son, Joey, born in August 1991.

== Filmography ==
Writer

- The General's Daughter (1999)
- Madso's War (2010) (Also executive producer)
- Battle: Los Angeles (2011)

Uncredited rewrites

- Exit Wounds (2001)

Unmade screenplays

Year	Title	Description	Ref.
1994	Already Dead	Undercover cop infiltrates New York mob. He endangers wife and son when he finds out mob's operation has reached global proportions and has ties to the White House.	
1998	Official Assassins	A thriller set in post-World War II Berlin involving Russian and American intelligence agencies.	
2002	White Out	Based on a novel by former New York Police Officer Jerry Speziale.	
