= Cathedral (novel) =

1981 novel by American author Nelson DeMille

- Author: Nelson DeMille
- Language: English
- Genre: Thriller
- Publisher: Delacorte Press
- Publication date: May 1981
- Publication place: United States
- Media type: Print (hardback & paperback)
- Pages: 575
- ISBN: 9780440011408
- OCLC: 7175079
- Dewey Decimal: 813/.54 19
- LC Class: PS3554.E472 C3

Cathedral is a 1981 novel by American author Nelson DeMille. The novel involves the seizing of St. Patrick's Cathedral by members of the Irish Republican Army on St. Patrick's Day.
