= Word of Honor (novel) =

Novel by Nelson DeMille

- Author: Nelson DeMille
- Cover artist: Gene Light
- Language: English
- Genre: Novel
- Publisher: Grand Central Publishing
- Publication date: November 1, 1985
- Publication place: United States
- Media type: Print (Hardback & Paperback)
- Pages: 518
- ISBN: 9780446512800
- OCLC: 12052966
- Dewey Decimal: 813/.54 19
- LC Class: PS3554.E472 W6 1985

Word of Honor is the fifth major novel by American writer Nelson DeMille and the first which involves the Vietnam War. It was originally published in 1985 by Warner Books. Time Magazine referred to it as "The Caine Mutiny of the 80s", while Publishers Weekly stated that it is comparable to the classic but has "wider implications". The novel covers broad themes associated with war, crime and punishment, culpability of leaders, guilt, justice, honor, and the Vietnam War.

The novel centers on a Vietnam veteran, Benjamin Tyson, who has made a great life for himself after serving as a lieutenant in the war. An investigative journalist uncovers a possible massacre similar to My Lai committed by Tyson's platoon in 1968. This sets off a series of events that affects Tyson's life. The Army seeks punishment while the public is conflicted. Complex issues of Tyson's culpability arise as DeMille slowly reveals more detail surrounding what really happened. The novel blends intense and accurate Vietnam War flashbacks with "intelligent and highly charged courtroom melodrama".

== Characters ==
- Benjamin Tyson – The main protagonist of the novel. He is in his 40s and is a successful executive. He is humorous, cynical, intelligent, caring, and honorable. He is more conservative than his liberal wife. Tyson served as an infantry platoon leader with the First Cavalry Division and fought in Vietnam.
- Marcy McClure Tyson – Ben's wife. In the late 60s, she was a poster child for the liberal peace movement.
- David Tyson – Ben's 16-year-old son.
- Andrew Picard – The writer of Hue: Death of a City, the book that illustrates the Misericorde Hospital Massacre and assigns blame on Ben Tyson, himself a veteran of the Marine Corps in Hue.
- Karen Harper – The officer assigned by the Army to investigate whether charges should be brought against Ben Tyson. While performing her job, however, she begins to like Tyson.
- Colonel Pierce – The main prosecutor attempting to convict Tyson of murder.
- Colonel Sproule – The judge of the Tyson court martial.
- Steven Brandt – The medic in Tyson's platoon in Vietnam.
- Richard Farley – One of the members of Tyson's platoon. He testifies against Tyson.
- Colonel Gilmore – He presides over Tyson's article 32 investigation hearing (pre-trial hearing).
- Vincent Corva – Tyson's defense attorney.
- John McCormick – Tyson's neighbor. Tyson first finds out about Picard's book from seeing him read it.
- Colonel Levin – Adjutant of the post that Tyson is ordered to stay at when he is recalled to duty.

== Plot ==
=== Part One: Chapters 1–14 ===
Ben Tyson finds and reads excerpts from Hue: Death of a City, a recently published book by Andrew Picard about the Battle of Hue during the Vietnam War. The book highlights an incident similar to the My Lai massacre and is based on information provided to Picard from two men in Tyson's platoon and from a nun who escaped the incident. It names Tyson as the leader of the platoon, which is shot at as it approaches a hospital, suffering one fatality and two injuries. According to the book, a doctor at the hospital refuses to help one of the American soldiers because his condition is too bad; after an American soldier shoots the doctor and others are killed in the hospital, chaos ensues and, according to Picard, the platoon decides to kill all the witnesses (everyone in the hospital). The book never mentions names except Tyson's, stating that he was the platoon lieutenant.

Tyson researches his possible options and learns that a platoon leader can be held accountable for the actions of his men if he should have anticipated them or possibly if he knew of them and did not report them. In this case, the charge would have to be murder since the statute of limitations ran out on other possible charges. Tyson tells his wife, Marcy, of the book and has her read it. He does not deny what the book charges, saying that on the whole it is accurate. Marcy is a liberal, was very active in the 1960s anti-war movement, and is somewhat skeptical of her husband's actions but still supports him.

The Tysons' social life begins to take a hit and the tabloids begin to focus first on Ben and second on Marcy. A famous picture of a nude Marcy which was first printed in Life in the 1960s is reprinted. Tyson is visited by Chet Brown, a mysterious high-level agent, who advises and warns him to play fair and not attack the Army, thereby further dirtying Vietnam and America's role in it. He also learns that the Army is looking into assigning him active orders again so that they will be able to court-martial him for murder.

=== Part Two: Chapters 15–41 ===
Tyson is given the notice that he has been summoned to return to active duty. The Army enlists Major Karen Harper to lead the investigation to see if Tyson should be court-martialed. The two meet and Tyson gives her a different story of the incident that contradicts Picard's. In his version, the platoon did not know the building was a hospital and that it was fortified by the Vietcong. His platoon defeated the Vietcong in the hospital. Tyson visits the Vietnam War Memorial and sees Larry Cane's name on it. Cane served in his platoon and died in the incident. According to Picard's book, he was shot by Vietcong as the platoon approached the hospital. Tyson reflects on the kind letter he wrote to the Cane family, speaking of his bravery, and ensuring them that he died quickly without pain. He then reflects that this latter part was the only truth, something he knew because he "shot him through the heart."

Tyson meets Major Harper again and tempers run high as he smashes a glass across the wall. Harper tells him of the two men who told Picard about the story: medic Steven Brandt and soldier Richard Farley. She also tells him the other infantrymen gave exactly the same story he did. Tyson and Harper are attracted to each other, but neither acts. They talk about truth and justice, the nun (Sister Theresa) whom Picard interviewed who is missing, and what should be done. It is revealed that the 25-year-old Tyson was leading a platoon of 17-, 18-, and 19-year-olds who had witnessed and participated in horrific battles over the last few months.

Tyson visits Picard and both men learn to respect the other. Picard seems to regret indicting Tyson in his book. Tyson decides to swim across the inlet from Picard's to the summer residence his family recently moved into to avoid publicity. His knee, which was injured in Vietnam, gives out and he almost drowns. He reconnects with his wife and then reports for active duty. He meets with Colonel Levin and is ordered to stay on base and serve as a museum guide. On Levin's recommendation, he gets a good defense attorney. He also meets with Major Harper again, who tells him she has found enough evidence to submit a charge of murder but at the same time suspects the government is tampering with the case. Harper asks if he can discredit Brandt. He says that he possibly could, but then he would be like Brandt, bringing up war horror that should be left as it was. The two almost embrace but Tyson's wife Marcy comes to the door just before they do.

A groundswell of public sentiment has been building for Tyson, as more and more people feel the war is over and the Army is hanging him out to dry. General William Van Arken, the Judge Advocate General of the Army who started the entire process, learns well-respected Colonel Horton that it is just that. Van Arken does not listen and says that it has already begun. Tyson sets up a meeting with and then punches the tabloid journalist who smeared his wife before Chet Brown and his guys intervene and talk with Tyson again. Tyson and his attorney Vincent Corva hear of and begin preparation for the trial process. It is revealed that two weeks after the Hue Hospital incident, Tyson was wounded by shrapnel and the medic Brandt tried to kill him by injecting a lethal dose of morphine.

A pre-trial Article 32 investigation takes place in which Corva pins Tyson with his medals for bravery in the Hue battle (one was never given to him and Karen Harper just procured it). This irritates Colonel Pierce, council for the prosecution. Major Harper interviews Andrew Picard and identifies that Sister Theresa told Picard that Tyson "spared" or "saved" her life. She spoke in French, however, and used "sauver" which could mean either. She asks Picard why he did not include this and he responds that it was an error of omission that he left out, because it did not fit with Brandt's story. Harper also gets Picard to admit that the nun said Brandt was a man who abuses young girls. Picard then explains that this trial of Tyson is a travesty and that he, now believes Brandt lied to him about Tyson ordering his troops to shoot anyone in the hospital and that he thinks Tyson's troops mutinied. Moreover, he states that even Tyson's platoon, in his estimation, were victims of "war, combat fatigue, and shock." Despite the positive results for Tyson, Col Gilmer decides to recommend a court martial in which Tyson will be tried for murder.

=== Part Three: Chapters 42–54 ===
The court martial begins with Pierce calling Richard Farley to the stand. Farley, a paraplegic, gives wrenching testimony against Tyson. He first explains an incident the morning of the Hue Massacre in which Tyson "ordered" his troops to shoot civilians, then explains the Hue Hospital Massacre, how Tyson had all the platoon swear to never tell of the incident to anyone, and how the group concocted a new, different story to explain it. Corva cross-examines him and it is learned that Farley stated that Tyson said to "waste them" in the hospital. Then, according to Farley, the platoon killed everyone. Corva gets Farley to admit that Tyson said to "waste the Gooks" and that Tyson meant only enemy soldiers.

Court is adjourned and Tyson meets Brandt in a back alley. Brandt is terrified and Tyson ambiguously talks about what Brandt did to him the last time they saw each other and how the other men are upset with him, and that there would be payback. Brandt's testimony supports Farley's and is damaging to Tyson. He explains how Tyson was very mad the hospital staff was not helping his wounded soldier and how the soldier was already past the point of life. Corva gains some on his cross-examination of Brandt as it becomes clear he may not be telling the whole truth. In particular, Corva attacks Brandt's explanation of the first shots that rang out in the hospital and that how he cannot identify who they were from. Corva also gets Brandt to tell the court that Beltran threw a grenade into one room when before he said he couldn't see who did that. A barrage of questions and dialogue ends with Corva asking, "Did you see Larry Cane shoot anyone?" and Brandt responding, "No." To which Corva responds, "Larry Cane was dead, Mr. Brandt."

The court members then question Brandt, asking him many questions about the incident and why he did not tell anyone until just recently. The prosecution rests, but after their performance Tyson's five platoon witnesses are unsure of testifying. Their lawyers are urging them not to because they could then face perjury charges. These witnesses offer to make statements in extenuation and mitigation if a guilty verdict is given. Tyson considers testifying but realizes it will be better to make a statement in the sentencing phase. The defense rests without calling any witnesses. There is a lengthy wait in which Tyson rejects seeing his family. The court members find Tyson guilty (2/3 concurring).

Chet Brown meets with Tyson and tells him that if he reads a given statement he will be pardoned and serve no jail time. Corva also learns that the Army has found Dan Kelly, Tyson's radiotelephone operator. Kelly's testimony is similar to Brandt's but with glaring differences. He first explains Tyson's sarcastic order to shoot the civilians the morning of the Hue massacre. He explains how it was Tyson's men who were overly aggressive in attacking them and that Tyson was irate and sarcastically left them with that remark. In fact, Kelly even reports on hearing Simcox and Farley talking about how Tyson is "too soft of the gooks."

Kelly also explains how earlier, he and Tyson found Brandt raping young adolescent Vietnamese. As punishment, Tyson kicked and threw Brandt into water filled with leeches. Brandt was then cared for and Tyson returned that night to him and told him that if he did not report back to his platoon he would be court-martialed on a variety of charges. Upon hearing the beginning of this, Brandt leaves the courtroom.

Kelly then explains the Hue Massacre. Colonel Sproule the judge, interrupts him, asking why he did not mention the death of Larry Cane outside the hospital. Kelly responds that this is because Cane was still alive in the hospital. Kelly explains how Peterson was dying at the feet of Tyson, begging for help. After the doctor refused to treat him, Tyson slapped him. Farley and Beltran then put Peterson on a hospital bed. An Australian then came into the room shouting obscenities at the American soldiers and America in general. Larry Cane screamed at him and then shot him. Beltran then shot two North Viets. Cane then fired his M-16 all over. Kelly and Tyson dove on the floor. Tyson drew his pistol, aimed it at Cane, and ordered him to drop his rifle. He didn't and Tyson shot him dead. Kelly then goes on explaining how pandemonium ensued, how Farley was livid that Tyson shot his friend, and how Beltran and the men mutinied and had their guns locked on Tyson. Tyson said they would all be charged and probably would have been shot, but Kelly punched him to remove the threat from Beltran and the others. Finally, Kelly explains how Tyson was a prisoner for a while, how he had to radio certain comments to remain alive, and how he eventually got control back by explaining that they would take an oath to never mention the incident again.

Court adjourns and Tyson sees his wife and son for the first time in a while. The court-martial is concluded with Tyson giving a speech. He explains that he will not give a speech of extenuation and mitigation and how he knows that the crime he committed was nothing that happened in the hospital but instead the fact that he never reported what happened. He explains how he briefly considered reporting it but only briefly. And that, even though he knows it was an immoral and illegal one, he would make the same decision. He does explain how he was somewhat protecting his men and that he is sad for them and their families now that the truth has come out. But at the same time he points out that this sadness is nothing compared to the innocent lives lost at the hospital. He ends by saying he cannot think of anything extenuating and mitigating. Corva then questions him to continue and an awkward questioning phase begins until Tyson admits that everything could come under battle fatigue.

Court adjourns and the members reach a decision quickly. They sentence Tyson to be dismissed from the Army and that is all. Pierce storms out of the courtroom. Tyson meets and embraces his family, and states, "Let's go home."

== Critical reception ==
"Does a 17-year-old incident still have the power to shock? Indeed it does, and Nelson DeMille, who served as a lieutenant in Vietnam, knows exactly how to employ his surge within us, but the military scenes have the gunmetal ring of authenticity. This is The Caine Mutiny of the '80s, a long, over-the-shoulder look at a time that grows larger as it recedes from sight." – Time

"If fiction can assuage the lingering moral pain of the Vietnam War, it's through the kind of driving honesty coupled with knowledgeability that DeMille (By the Rivers of Babylon) employs here, in a story which, as riveting as The Caine Mutiny but with wider implications, probes the conflicting concepts of honor, duty and loyalty as they relate to an event of the My Lai variety and assesses blame." – Publishers Weekly

"Word of Honor entertains without reaching for moral revelation or subtle psychological effects. It is about a nail-biting career complication in the life of a man whom, otherwise, you would like in your golfing foursome." – Richard Nalley, The New York Times.

"DeMille has hit a home run.... One is completely gripped by the question of what will happen to the haunted, guilt-resistant, essentially honorable man as his life and loved ones are massacred... Bears favorable comparison with Herman Wouk's The Caine Mutiny... [with its] deep-running themes." – Kirkus Reviews

"Moving...thought-provoking...it will hold you spellbound... This novel will make every reader stop and think about personal values, the moral issues of guilt or innocence, and culpability in wartime." – Richmond Times-Dispatch

Word of Honor has 4.5/5 stars on both amazon.com and bn.com as of June 2008.

== Film adaptation ==
The novel was made into the television movie Word of Honor, which aired on TNT on December 6, 2003. It was directed by Robert Markowitz and starred Don Johnson, Jeanne Tripplehorn, and Sharon Lawrence. Word of Honor was produced by Michael Jaffe, Howard Braunstein, Lance Robbins, Leslie Grief, and Wendy Hill-Tout.
