= The Sniper (novel) =

1974 thriller novel by Nelson DeMille

- First edition
- Author: Nelson DeMille
- Language: English
- Genre: Fiction
- Publisher: Leisure Books
- Publication date: 1974
- Publication place: United States
- Followed by: The Hammer of God

The Sniper is a 1974 thriller novel by American author Nelson DeMille. It was DeMille's first published novel. The Sniper introduces character NYPD Sergeant, Joe Ryker. Like the other books in the Joe Ryker series, it was re-published in 1989 with the author as "Jack Cannon."

== Plot ==
The Sniper is about a tough New York City Police Department Sergeant named Joe Ryker and his pursuit of a murdering sniper named Homer Cyrus. (In the later reprints of the book, the antagonist's name is changed to Henry Cyrus.) The sniper chooses his victims at random, killing with the cold skill of a professional. Detective Sgt. Ryker is going after him in a deadly battle; only one will survive!

== See also ==
- List of books, articles and documentaries about snipers
