= Palabra de honor =

Palabra de honor may refer to:

- Palabra de honor (film), a 1939 Argentine comedy film
- Palabra de honor (album), a 1984 album by Luis Miguel
