= By the Rivers of Babylon =

1978 novel by Nelson DeMille

- First edition
- Author: Nelson DeMille
- Language: English
- Genre: Thriller
- Publisher: Harcourt Brace Jovanovich
- Publication date: 1978
- Publication place: United States
- Media type: Print
- Pages: 391
- ISBN: 9780151152780
- OCLC: 3650663

By the Rivers of Babylon is a 1978 thriller novel by Nelson DeMille.

The plot focuses on two new Concorde jets that are flying to a U.N. meeting that will bring peace to the Middle East. However, en route to the meeting, the crews are advised by radio that bombs were hidden during the aircraft's manufacture; they are forced on to an alternate route. One jet ignores warnings and is destroyed by remote control, and the other crash lands near the ruins of Babylon. Once crashed, the occupants of the jet must defend themselves against an army of Palestinian troops while the Israelis attempt to mount a rescue mission.
