= The Charm School (novel) =

1988 novel by Nelson DeMille

- Author: Nelson DeMille
- Language: English
- Genre: Fiction
- Publisher: Warner Books
- Publication date: April 1, 1988
- Pages: 533
- ISBN: 9780446353205
- OCLC: 17300504

The Charm School is a 1988 spy thriller novel by American author Nelson DeMille; it is set in the Soviet Union.

In a 2010 FBI investigation, striking similarities were noted between a real-life case and DeMille's book.

== Plot ==
The novel's hero is U.S Air Force Colonel Sam Hollis, a former F-4 Phantom Fighter pilot who fought in Vietnam. Hollis was shot down during the war and was disqualified from flying. Later on he was transferred to US Air Force Intelligence and served as an intelligence officer and air attaché at the American embassy in Moscow. A young American MBA graduate driving in the Russian countryside encounters another American, claiming to have escaped a secret Russian POW camp—leaving numerous others behind who are still captive and being used to "Americanize" Soviet spies. When the information reaches Hollis, he begins to investigate and discovers a secret so dangerous that it might cost him his life.

== Potential film adaptation ==
The films rights were first optioned in 1992 by producer Robert Kline.

In March 2003, Variety reported that Crusader Entertainment had optioned the book, with Kevin Bernhardt penning the script, and Howard Baldwin producing.

In March 2005, it was reported that Frank Marshall had signed on as producer.

In August 2009, DeMille reported that Ericson Core was hired as director, and the screenplay was to be penned by Frank Pearson.
