= Nelson DeMille =

American author (1943–2024)

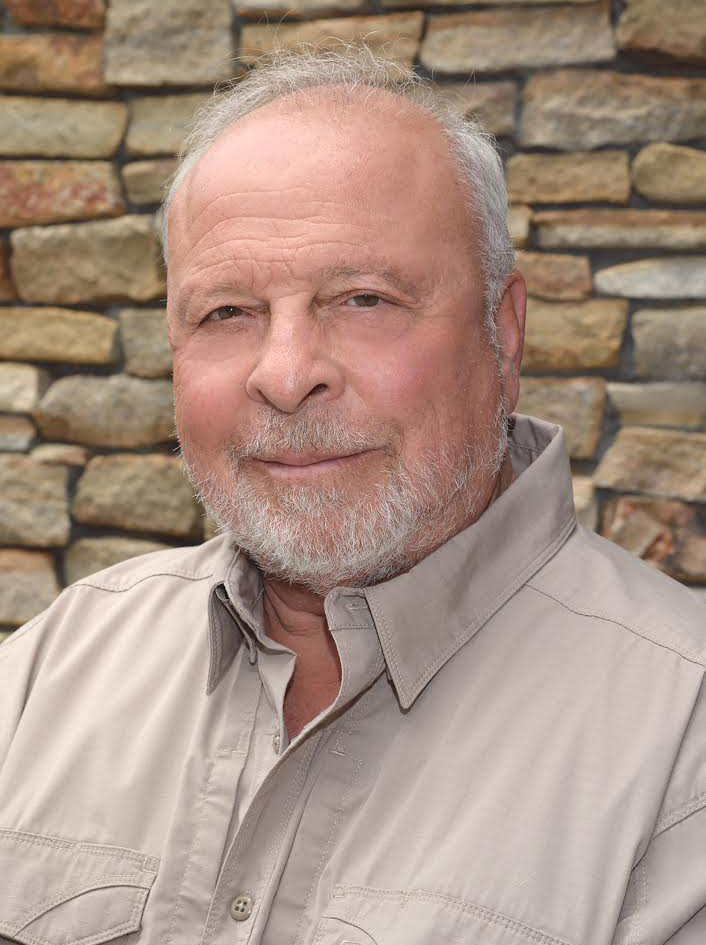
- DeMille in 2017
- Born: Nelson Richard DeMille; August 23, 1943; New York City, U.S.
- Died: September 17, 2024 (aged 81); Mineola, New York, U.S.
- Education: Hofstra University
- Occupation: Novelist
- Spouse: Sandy DeMille
- Children: 3
- Writing career
- Pen name: Jack Cannon; Kurt Ladner; Brad Matthews; Ellen Kay
- Genres: Crime fiction; Thriller; Suspense; Action adventure; Mystery
- Website: www.nelsondemille.net

Nelson Richard DeMille (August 23, 1943 – September 17, 2024) was an American author of action adventure and suspense novels. His novels include Plum Island, The Charm School, and The General's Daughter. DeMille also wrote under the pen names Jack Cannon, Kurt Ladner, Ellen Kay, and Brad Matthews.

== Biography ==
DeMille was born in Jamaica, NY on August 23, 1943, to Huron DeMille (1916–1992) and Antonia aka Molly Panzera (1919–1999). Huron was born in Hagersville, Ontario, Canada and immigrated to the United States circa 1935. Nelson moved as a child with his family to Elmont, Long Island, where he and his brothers were raised. He attended Elmont Memorial High School, where he played football and ran track. He was predeceased by his three brothers: Clark (1950–1980), Dennis (1947–2018) and Lance (1957–2022). There is a street in Elmont named Demille Avenue after his father, a builder who helped develop Elmont in its early years.

After spending three years at Hofstra University, DeMille joined the Army and attended Officer Candidate School. He was a first lieutenant in the United States Army (1966–1969) and saw action as an infantry platoon leader with the First Cavalry Division in Vietnam. He was decorated with the Air Medal, the Bronze Star, and the Vietnamese Cross of Gallantry, and was awarded the Combat Infantryman Badge.

DeMille returned to Hofstra University, where he received his degree in political science and history. He was married three times, and he had three children, Lauren, Alexander, and James. He lived in Garden City, New York.

DeMille's earlier books were New York City Police Department (NYPD) detective novels. His first major novel was By the Rivers of Babylon, published in 1978 and still in print, as are all his succeeding novels. He was a member of American Mensa and the Authors Guild, and president of the Mystery Writers of America. He was also a member of the International Thriller Writers, who honored him as 2015 ThrillerMaster of the Year. DeMille held three honorary doctorates: Doctor of Humane Letters from Hofstra University, Doctor of Literature from Long Island University, and Doctor of Humane Letters from Dowling College.

DeMille is the author of By the Rivers of Babylon, Cathedral, The Talbot Odyssey, Word of Honor, The Charm School, The Gold Coast, The General's Daughter, Spencerville, Plum Island, The Lion’s Game, Up Country, Night Fall, Wild Fire, The Gate House, The Lion, The Panther, The Quest, Radiant Angel, and The Cuban Affair. He also co-authored Mayday with Thomas Block, and The Deserter and Blood Lines with his son, Alex DeMille, as well as contributing short stories, book reviews, and articles to magazines and newspapers both online and in print.

DeMille died of esophageal cancer at NYU Langone Hospital – Long Island on September 17, 2024, at the age of 81.

== Writing style ==
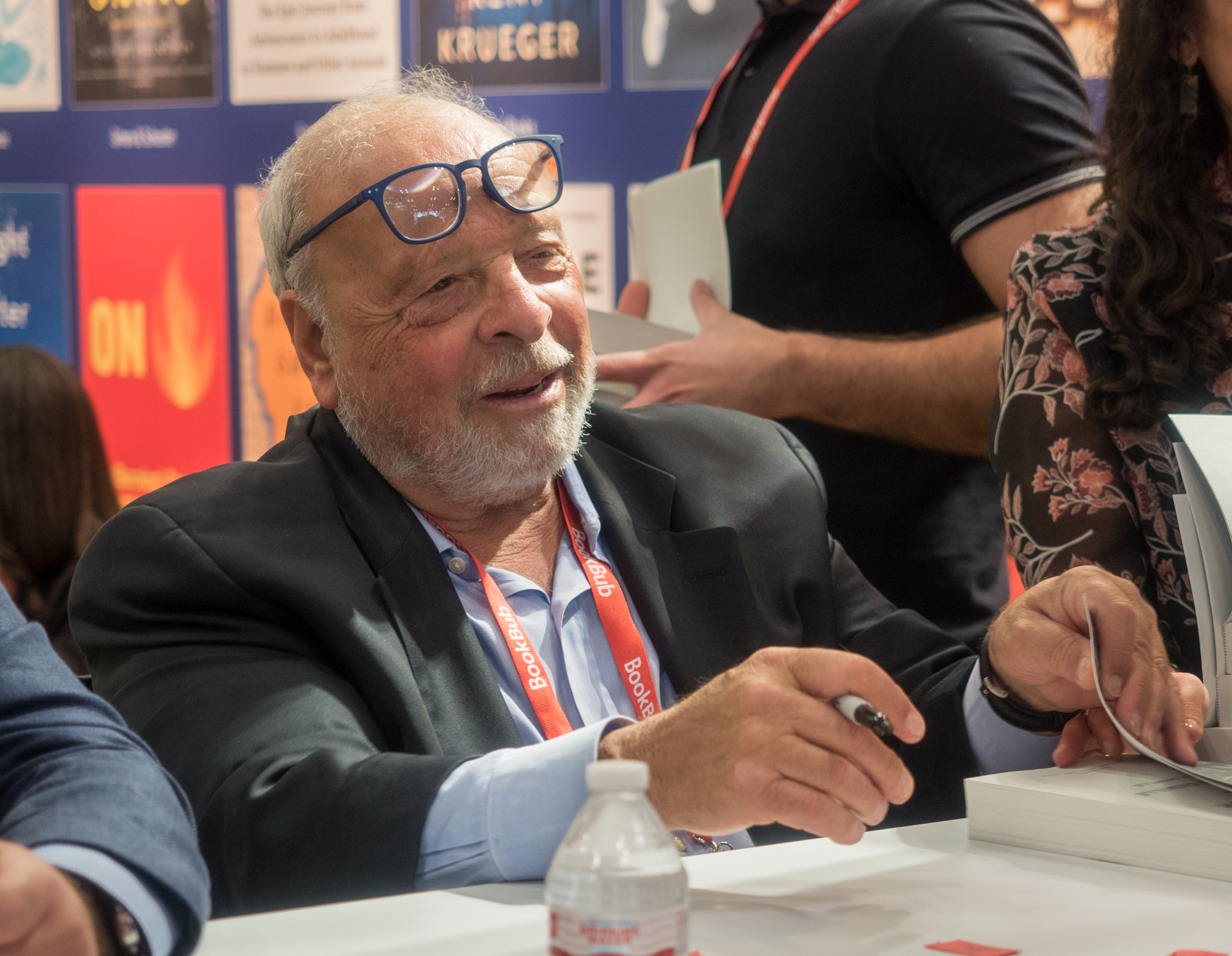
DeMille signing books at BookExpo America in 2019

Many of DeMille's books are written in the first person, following a linear plotline in which the reader moves along with the main character.

Although the tone of DeMille's writing varies from novel to novel, one of his consistent tools is liberal use of sarcasm and dry humor.

Most DeMille novels, especially the more recent ones, avoid "Hollywood" endings; instead, they finish either inconclusively or with the hero successfully exposing a secret or solving a mystery while suffering in his career or personal life as a result. There are generally loose ends left for the reader to puzzle over, such as in Night Fall.

== Works ==
DeMille's home Long Island is a setting in many parts of his novels, as in The Gold Coast, The Gate House, Plum Island, Word of Honor, Night Fall, and Radiant Angel. His most recent novels have followed two main characters, John Corey (starring in seven novels) and Paul Brenner (starring in two novels, with also a part in Corey's sixth novel). In earlier works, the storylines were completely separate, but there have been hints in the novels that they are part of a larger "DeMille Universe" that references events and characters in earlier novels, such as The Gold Coast and The Charm School.

DeMille spent approximately 16 months creating each of his novels due to the extensive research involved, and because he wrote them longhand on legal pads with a number one pencil.

== Written books ==
=== John Sutter series ===
1. The Gold Coast (1990)
2. The Gate House (2008)

==== Characters ====
John Sutter, Susan Sutter, Felix Mancuso, and several other characters of The Gold Coast reappear in the sequel The Gate House.

=== Paul Brenner series ===
1. The General's Daughter (1992)
2. Up Country (2002)
3. The Panther (2012), Paul Brenner teams up with John Corey on a case.

==== Characters ====
Paul Brenner, a criminal investigator/ Special Agent for the United States Army's Criminal Investigation Division (CID). He was introduced in The General's Daughter and reappears in Up Country, and The Panther. In the latter novel he has retired from the Army and works as a Special Agent for the US State Department's Diplomatic Security Service (DSS). His girlfriend is US Army CID investigator/ Special Agent Cynthia Sunhill.

Colonel Karl Hellman is Brenner's superior officer at the CID. He appeared in The General's Daughter and Up Country.

=== John Corey series ===
1. Plum Island (1997)
2. The Lion's Game (2000)
3. Night Fall (2004)
4. Wild Fire (2006)
5. The Lion (2010), direct sequel to The Lion's Game
6. The Panther (2012), John Corey teams up with Paul Brenner on a case.
7. Radiant Angel (2015)
8. The Maze (2022)

==== Characters ====
- John Corey, a former homicide detective, medically retired from the NYPD with 3 gunshot wounds, now working for the FBI’s Anti-Terrorist Task Force. He was introduced in Plum Island and reappears in The Lion's Game, Night Fall, Wild Fire, The Lion, The Panther, Radiant Angel, and The Maze.
- Kate Mayfield, an F.B.I. special agent. Introduced in The Lion's Game. She marries Corey and reappears in Night Fall, Wild Fire, The Lion, The Panther, and Radiant Angel.
- Asad Khalil, a Libyan terrorist. His family was wiped out in an American military attack in 1986, for which he swore revenge.
- Ted Nash, a CIA agent and arch-rival of Corey, who is introduced in Plum Island and reappears in The Lion's Game, Night Fall, and Wild Fire.

=== Joe Ryker series ===
1. The Sniper (1974)
2. The Hammer of God (1974)
3. The Terrorists (1974)
4. The Agent of Death (1975)
5. The Smack Man (1975)
6. The Cannibal (1975)
7. The Night of the Phoenix (1975)

==== Characters ====
NYPD Sergeant Joe Ryker, a tired, no-nonsense detective assigned to the NYPD Detective Bureau, whose natural understanding of his environment gives him an enhanced instinct for tracking down criminals. A loner, he carries two weapons: a standard police snub-nosed .38 Special revolver in an ankle holster, and a .357 Magnum revolver carried in a shoulder-holster. He appeared in the first six novels by DeMille. All were republished in 1989 bearing DeMille's nom-de-plume "Jack Cannon".

=== Scott Brodie and Maggie Taylor series ===
All three co-authored with DeMille's son, Alex DeMille.

1. The Deserter (2019)
2. Blood Lines (2023)
3. The Tin Men (2025)

==== Characters ====
U.S. Army Criminal Investigation Division Special Agents Scott Brodie and Maggie Taylor first join forces on a mission in Venezuela to locate and detain an infamous Army Special Forces deserter, and then in Berlin to find the killer of a CID colleague. The Tin Men was the final novel by Nelson DeMille, published posthumously in 2025.

=== Stand-alone novels ===
1. The Quest (1975, re-released 2013)
2. By the Rivers of Babylon (1978)
3. Cathedral (1981)
4. The Talbot Odyssey (1984)
5. Word of Honor (1985)
6. The Charm School (1988)
7. Spencerville (1994)
8. Mayday (1998)
9. The Cuban Affair (2017)

==== Characters ====
Colonel Petr Burov/Boris/Boris Korsakov: Though not explicitly stated, DeMille hints that Burov, the antagonist in The Charm School, is the same person as the mysterious "Boris," a character in The Lion's Game and The Lion who trained Asad Khalil.

=== Short fiction ===
1. The Mystery at Thorn Mansion (1976)
2. Life or Breath (1976)
3. "Revenge and Rebellion", in The Plot Thickens, (1997)
4. The Rich and the Dead (2011)
5. The Book Case (2011)
6. Death Benefits (2012)
7. Rendezvous (2012)

=== Other novels ===
1. Hitler's Children: The True Story of Nazi Human Stud Farms (1976) (as Kurt Ladner)
2. Killer Sharks: The Real Story (1977) (as Brad Mathews)

=== Non-fiction ===
1. The Five-Million-Dollar Woman: Barbara Walters (1976) (as Ellen Kay)

=== Contributed works ===
1. The Plot Thickens (1997)
2. Getting Your Book Published for Dummies (2000)
3. Takeoff! (2000)
4. The Best American Mystery Stories (2004)
5. Dangerous Women (2005)
6. The Book that Changed my Life (2007)
7. In the Shadow of the Master: Classic Tales by Edgar Allan Poe (2009)
8. The Rich and the Dead (2011)
9. The Book Case (2011)
10. Long Island’s Gold Coast (2012)
11. OHEKA Castle (2012)
12. Death Benefits (2012)
13. Rendezvous (2012)
14. The Mystery Writers of America Cookbook (2015)
15. The Books that Changed My Life (2016)
16. Great Minds Think and Write: 50 Years of the Mensa Bulletin (2016)
17. The Artists’ and Writers’ Cookbook: A Collection of Stories and Recipes (2016)
18. MatchUp (2017)

== Filmography ==
Novel adapted	Year of adaptation	Film/TV	Notes
The General's Daughter	1999	Film – Paramount	Starring John Travolta
Word of Honor	2003	TV – TNT	Starring Don Johnson
Mayday	2005	TV – CBS	Starring Aidan Quinn
