= Word of Honor (2003 film) =

2003 American television film

- DVD cover
- Genre: Drama
- Based on: Word of Honor by Nelson DeMille
- Written by: Jacob Epstein; Leslie Greif; Jean-Yves Pitoun; Tom Topor
- Directed by: Robert Markowitz
- Starring: Don Johnson; Jeanne Tripplehorn; Sharon Lawrence; John Heard; Arliss Howard; Peter MacNeill; Peter Stebbings; Jesse Johnson
- Music by: Gary Chang
- Country of origin: United States
- Original language: English

Production
- Executive producers: Michael Jaffe; Howard Braunstein; Wendy Hill-Tout; Lance Robbins; Leslie Greif
- Producer: Clara George
- Production location: Calgary
- Cinematography: Guy Dufaux
- Editor: David Beatty
- Running time: 91 minutes
- Production companies: Voice Pictures; Jaffe Braunstein Films; Greif Co.; Robbins Entertainment Group

Original release
- Network: TNT
- Release: December 6, 2003

Word of Honor is a 2003 American drama television film directed by Robert Markowitz, based on the 1985 novel of the same name by Nelson DeMille. The film stars Don Johnson, Jeanne Tripplehorn, Sharon Lawrence, John Heard and Arliss Howard. It aired on TNT on December 6, 2003.

== Premise ==
30 years after serving in Vietnam, ex-Army First Lieutenant Ben Tyson is brought forward for war crimes. Now a business executive, Tyson witnessed a massacre during the war. While he kept silent about it for decades, another veteran speaks out in a magazine article that mentions Tyson's involvement. A military attorney gets involved in the case, and a media frenzy ensues, as Tyson's family and military bonds begin to fray.

== Cast ==
- Don Johnson as Lieutenant Benjamin Tyson
- Jeanne Tripplehorn as Major Karen Harper
- Sharon Lawrence as Marcy McClure Tyson
- John Heard as Dr. Steven Brandt
- Arliss Howard as J.D. Runnells
- Peter MacNeill as General Norm Van Arken
- Peter Stebbings as Major Michael Taix
- Jesse Johnson as a Young Lieutenant Benjamin Tyson

== Production ==
Executive producer and co-writer Leslie Greif said of Don Johnson, "He can be the bad guy, he can be the good guy. He can walk that line." Johnson called his role a throwback to classic Henry Fonda and James Stewart characters. Filming took place in Calgary.

While the film came out at the start of the Iraq War amid conflicted opinions, and some writers drew those parallels, Greif said that they did not want the film to get "too political." The filmmakers, he said, instead wanted to explore broader questions of morality and the "murkiness of war."

== Critical reception ==
The film received several negative reviews. Ron Wertheimer of The New York Times wrote that it wasted its potential on "platitudes and plot contrivances." Brian Lowry of Variety called the film a disappointment, while praising the "top-notch cast".

== Nominations ==
- Nominated for a Golden Reel Award for Best Sound Editing in Television Long Form - Sound Effects & Foley - 2004
