= Spencerville (novel) =

1994 novel by Nelson DeMille

- Author: Nelson DeMille
- Language: English
- Publisher: Warner Books
- Publication date: October 1, 1994
- Publication place: United States
- Pages: 481
- ISBN: 9780446515054
- OCLC: 30544794
- Dewey Decimal: 813/.54 20
- LC Class: PS3554.E472 S67 1994

Spencerville is a 1994 novel by American author Nelson DeMille.

== Plot ==
The novel's hero is the Army Colonel Keith Landry, who served as an infantry platoon leader with the First Cavalry Division and fought in Vietnam. Later on he transferred to the Army Intelligence and served as an intelligence officer and operative for almost 25 years. After the end of the Cold War is over Landry retires and moves back to Spencerville, the small Midwestern town where he grew up. The town changed over the years. However, two people from Landry's old life are still there: Annie Prentis, his first love, and her possessive husband Cliff Baxter. Landry wants to get Annie back and that means a confrontation with Baxter, once the high school bully, and now Spencerville corrupt police chief.
