= The General's Daughter (film) =

1999 film by Simon West

- Theatrical release poster
- Directed by: Simon West
- Screenplay by: Christopher Bertolini; William Goldman
- Based on: The General's Daughter by Nelson DeMille
- Produced by: Mace Neufeld
- Starring: John Travolta; Madeleine Stowe; James Cromwell; Timothy Hutton; Clarence Williams III; James Woods
- Cinematography: Peter Menzies Jr.
- Edited by: Glen Scantlebury
- Music by: Carter Burwell
- Distributed by: Paramount Pictures
- Release date: June 18, 1999
- Running time: 116 minutes
- Country: United States
- Language: English
- Budget: $60–95 million
- Box office: $150 million

The General's Daughter is a 1999 American mystery thriller film directed by Simon West and written by Christopher Bertolini and William Goldman, based on the 1992 novel by Nelson DeMille. It stars John Travolta and Madeleine Stowe, with James Cromwell, Timothy Hutton, Clarence Williams III, and James Woods in supporting roles. The plot concerns the mysterious death of the daughter of a prominent Army general.

The General's Daughter was released in theaters in the United States on June 18, 1999, by Paramount Pictures. It received mixed-to-negative reviews from critics, but was a box-office success, grossing $150 million worldwide against its estimated budget of $60–95 million.

== Plot ==
Chief Warrant Officer Paul Brenner, an undercover agent of the United States Army Criminal Investigation Division Command (CID), masquerades as First Sergeant Frank White to broker an illegal arms trade with a self-proclaimed freedom fighter. At Fort MacCallum, Georgia, he gets a flat tire, and Captain Elisabeth Campbell, a psychological operations officer and the daughter of Lieutenant General Joseph "Fighting Joe" Campbell, the base commander, helps him change it.

The next evening, Elisabeth is found murdered. The base provost marshal, Colonel William Kent, secures the crime scene. Brenner and rape specialist Warrant Officer Sara Sunhill are brought in to investigate. Elisabeth's records show her grades plummeted in her second year at West Point.

Denied permission to search Elisabeth's house, Brenner and Sunhill break in and find a room containing video and BDSM equipment. An intruder attacks Brenner and removes the videotapes. Elisabeth's superior officer, Colonel Robert Moore, is arrested when he refuses to answer Brenner's questions.

When Sunhill is attacked at the crime scene in an attempt to intimidate the investigators, she notices an assailant wearing a silver claddagh ring which identifies him as Captain Jake Elby. At gunpoint, Elby confesses Elisabeth was sexually promiscuous as part of an extensive "psychological warfare" campaign against her father. Kent releases Moore from jail, confining him to quarters on the base.

There, Brenner and Sunhill find Moore dead of a bullet to the head. Campbell's adjutant, Colonel George Fowler, attempts to close the investigation, stating Moore killed himself out of guilt. However Brenner, doubting it was suicide, insists on continuing the investigation.

Brenner and Sunhill interview Elisabeth's psychiatrist, Colonel Donald Slesinger, at West Point. During a training exercise seven years earlier, several cadets gang-raped Elisabeth, leaving her staked down naked in the same position she was found murdered. Sunhill tracks down the former cadet who came forward about the initial attack. Guilt-ridden, he admits to witnessing it, explaining the male cadets hated her for surpassing them in the class standings.

A general corroborates the attack to Brenner, admitting he reluctantly agreed with another general who felt public mention of the attack would damage the cause of employing women in the military. The two generals convinced Elisabeth to stay silent, traumatizing her. Brenner deduces Elisabeth had Moore help her restage the attack scene, so she could force her father to see what he covered up. Campbell states that he threatened Elisabeth with a court martial due to her affairs with multiple officers, including Kent, and that she responded to his ultimatum with the staged attack scene. Unmoved, he left her tied naked to the stakes.

Brenner suspects Kent because of his release of Moore from prison, as well as taking Elisabeth's keys and sleeping with her. He joins him and Sunhill at the crime scene. Kent admits his obsession with Elisabeth, and her dismissal of him at the staged scene where she was upset over her father's lack of response. She spat in his face so he strangled her in a rage. After admitting to murdering Moore to evade detection, Kent commits suicide by stepping on a mine.

Brenner confronts Campbell as he prepares to board the plane to accompany Elisabeth's body to the funeral. He blames him for Elisabeth's death, as his betrayal effectively killed her, while Kent just put her out of her misery. Campbell warns him to keep silent, but Brenner has him court-martialed for conspiracy to conceal a crime.

== Cast ==
- John Travolta as CID Special Agent Chief Warrant Officer Three Paul Brenner
- Madeleine Stowe as CID Special Agent Warrant Officer One Sarah Sunhill
- James Cromwell as Lieutenant General Joe Campbell
- Timothy Hutton as Colonel William "Bill" Kent
- Leslie Stefanson as Captain Elisabeth Campbell, General Campbell's daughter and a psychological operations officer
- Daniel von Bargen as Chief of Police Yardley
- Clarence Williams III as Colonel George Fowler, adjutant to the general
- James Woods as Colonel Robert "Bob" Moore, Elisabeth's commanding officer
- Mark Boone Junior as Sergeant Dalbert Elkins
- John Beasley as Colonel Don Slesinger, Elisabeth's psychiatrist at West Point
- Boyd Kestner as Captain Jake Elby
- Brad Beyer as Captain Bransford
- John Benjamin Hickey as Captain Goodson
- John Frankenheimer as General Sonnenberg

== Production ==
The General's Daughter was directed by Simon West and produced by Mace Neufeld. It was an adaptation of the bestselling book of the same name, written by Nelson DeMille and published in 1992. William Goldman did some work on the script. Michael Douglas was originally attached to star.

Much of the film was filmed in various locations in and around Savannah, Georgia.

A love scene between John Travolta and Madeleine Stowe was cut from the final film.

Two key changes were made after test screenings: Travolta's character made a stronger moral stand at the end, and his being a military investigator working undercover was made clearer in the beginning.

Talking about filming the rape scene, Leslie Stefanson said, "It was horrible for me, but there was no way to avoid it. I don't want to necessarily ever do it again, but an important message could be brought up by it."

== Release ==
=== Home media ===
The General's Daughter was released on DVD and VHS on December 14, 1999.

== Reception ==
=== Box office ===
Against an estimated budget from $60 to $95 million, The General's Daughter grossed almost $103 million at the domestic box office, contributing to a worldwide gross of $150 million.

The General's Daughter earned $22.3 million during its opening weekend, ranking in third place behind Tarzan and Austin Powers: The Spy Who Shagged Me.

=== Critical response ===
The General's Daughter garnered mixed-to-negative reviews from critics. On the review aggregator website Rotten Tomatoes, 22% of 88 critics' reviews are positive, with an average rating of 5/10. The website's consensus reads: "Contrived performances and over-the-top sequences offer little real drama." Metacritic assigned the film a score of 47 out of 100, based on 24 critics, indicating "mixed or average" reviews. Audiences surveyed by CinemaScore gave the film a grade "B+" on scale of A to F.

Roger Ebert described The General's Daughter as well-made and with credible performances, but marred by a death scene that was "so unnecessarily graphic and gruesome that by the end I felt sort of unclean." Janet Maslin of The New York Times commended Travolta for carrying the film with "enjoyable ease" and Bertolini and Goldman for supplying "enough smart, amusing banter" in his interactions with Stowe and Woods, but criticized West's direction for "underutilizing good actors while pumping up the story's gratuitously ugly side" with lazy "fetishistic touches" of its subject matter, concluding that: "[A]ll the movie cares about is the deed itself and the way it was done." Russell Smith of The Austin Chronicle gave praise to the performances of Travolta, Stowe, and Woods, but felt a disconnect existed between the screenwriters and the director when crafting the narrative, concluding: "The General's Daughter inspires all kinds of cognitive dissonance with its blend of high-mindedness and cheesy titillation. Very odd, and very icky. Highly recommended for graduate psychology students in aberrant sexuality, but others can probably skip sans regret." Rolling Stone's Peter Travers also commended Travolta and Stowe for keeping the viewers "attractively distracted" with their chemistry and criticized West for sending his supporting cast "adrift" into "deep-fried Freudian melodrama", calling it "a lurid mess, a Southern gumbo simmering in Gothic cliche." Rita Kempley of The Washington Post criticized the film for playing up its "critical look at military injustice" by indulging in the misogyny of its overall plot, concluding that it "doesn't provide a compelling indictment of cronyism and duplicity within the military. While coverups and sex discrimination are continuing problems throughout society, this movie isn't offering any solutions. It's having its cheesecake and eating it, too."
