= The General's Daughter (novel) =

Book by Nelson DeMille

- Author: Nelson DeMille
- Language: English
- Series: Paul Brenner
- Genre: Thriller
- Publisher: Grand Central Publishing
- Publication date: 16 November 1992
- Publication place: United States
- Pages: 454
- ISBN: 978-0446364805
- OCLC: 54882951
- Followed by: Up Country

The General's Daughter is a 1992 military mystery novel by the American author Nelson DeMille. The novel introduces protagonist Paul Brenner, who is also featured in DeMille's novels Up Country and The Panther. The General's Daughter was made into a 1999 film of the same name, starring John Travolta and Madeleine Stowe. In the movie, Captain Ann Campbell's first name was changed to Elisabeth.

Reviews of the book describe it as an "immensely skilled and likeable page-turner", and a "deductive novel of unwavering excellence".
