= Manor Books =

- Founded: 1972
- Country of origin: United States
- Headquarters location: New York, NY
- Key people: Walter Weidenbaum, President
- Fiction genres: men's adventure, romance
- Imprints: King Size Gothic
- Official website: www.manorbookpublishers.com

Manor Books was an American publisher of paperback books. It was founded by Walter Weidenbaum in 1972 and based in New York City.

Manor's library was built on assets purchased from Macfadden Publications after the latter opted to exit the paperback business, and expanded with original titles. Manor ceased activities in 1981.

== Catalogue ==
Cover art for Robin Moore's Blind Spot (Manor Books, 1976)

The company's reprints were headlined by names who had previously graced the covers of Macfadden books, like Philip K. Dick and A.E. Van Vogt. Reprints of more minor works were sometimes packaged to highlight thematic connections with otherwise unrelated mainstream entertainment properties.

Most of the company's original catalogue consisted of novels in the thriller and men's adventure genre, competing with the likes of Leisure Books, Lancer Books and later Pinnacle Books, whom Weidenbaum had helped launch before divesting himself of his shares.

Prolific author Robin Moore (The Green Berets, The French Connection) wrote several books for Manor and was arguably its most famous contributor.

The company, like other paperback publishers, espoused a franchise-driven business model. Many series heroes were reminiscent of the 1970s movie tough guys epitomized by Clint Eastwood and Charles Bronson. Perhaps the best remembered are Keller by Nelson DeMille (The General's Daughter), a rework of the Joe Stryker novels DeMille wrote for Leisure Books, and The Enforcer, which Manor took over from ailing Lancer Books. Another series, Mace by Lee Chang, was one of the first to capitalize on the popularity of Asian martial arts films. In actuality, Chang was a pseudonym for Jewish-American paperback original veteran Joseph Rosenberger. Under his real name, Rosenberger penned blaxploitation-style books starring the African-American anti-hero Louis Luther King The Murder Master.

The company also released biographies. Titles exhumed from the Macfadden vaults included the memoirs of Groucho Marx and Mae West, while Manor would commission new titles to cash in on recent events involving a celebrity. Several of them were written by New York Post scribe George Carpozi.

The company made overture towards female readers with its King Size Gothic line dedicated to paranormal romance, a popular subject at the time. The name was both an indication of the books' somewhat generous content in comparison to most paperback original novels, and a ripoff of the Queen Size Gothic collection by rival Popular Library.

== Guaranteed Satisfaction ==

A marketing gimmick used by Manor was the Seal of Guaranteed Reader Satisfaction, which offered compensation if the customer was not pleased with his purchase.
