= 1902 in animation =

Events in 1902 in animation.

== Events ==
- Date uncertain - Nuremberg toy companies Gebrüder Bing and Ernst Plank were offering chromolithographed film loops for their toy kinematographs. The films were traced from live-action film footage. The technique is a precursor of rotoscoping.

== Films released ==
- April 3 - Fun in a Bakery Shop: Edwin S. Porter used stop-motion animation to depict clay loaves being sculpted into faces. The film's plot was only the pretext of showcasing the skills of a fast sculptor.

== Births ==
=== February ===
- February 9: Fred Harman, American animator, cartoonist, and illustrator (Kansas City Film Ad Company, business partner of Walt Disney), (d. 1982).

=== April ===
- April 27: Harry Stockwell, American actor and singer (voice of the Prince in Snow White and the Seven Dwarfs), (d. 1984).

=== June ===
- June 17: Sammy Fain, American composer (Walt Disney Animation Studios), (d. 1989).
- June 20: Antoine Payen, French animator, and illustrator (Les Enfants du Ciel, Cri-Cri, Ludo et l'orage), (d. 1985).
- June 30: Tom Palmer, Italian-American animator, animation director, and training film supervisor (Walt Disney Productions, Walter Lantz Studio, Warner Bros. Cartoons, creator of Buddy), (d. 1972).

=== July ===
- July 13: Dan Gordon, American comics artist, animator, director and screenwriter (Van Beuren Studios, Fleischer Studios, Famous Studios, Hanna-Barbera), (d. 1970).

=== September ===
- September 2: Norm Ferguson, American animator and sequence director, (Walt Disney Company, designed Peg-Leg Pete, the Big Bad Wolf, and Pluto, served as the primary animator of the witch in Snow White and the Seven Dwarfs), (d. 1957).
- September 25: Al Hoffman, American composer (Walt Disney Animation Studios), (d. 1960).

=== October ===
- October 2: William Timym, Austrian-English animator and comics artist (Bleep and Booster, and Bengo the Boxer), (d. 1990).

=== November ===
- November 1: Vivie Risto, American animator and comics artist (Walt Disney Company, Warner Bros Cartoons, Hanna-Barbera), (d. 1981).
- November 22: Ethel Smith, American organist (played organ during the "Blame It on the Samba" segment in Melody Time), (d. 1996).
- November 23: Victor Jory, Canadian-American actor (narrator in Tubby the Tuba), (d. 1982).

=== December ===
- December 14: Frances Bavier, American actress (model for Flora in Sleeping Beauty), (d. 1989).
- December 19: Ralph Richardson, British actor (voice of Chief Rabbit in Watership Down), (d. 1983).
- December 25: Vera Tsekhanovskaya, Russian animation director and illustrator (Belgoskino, Lenfilm, directed The Wild Swans), (d. 1977).
- December 27: Carman Maxwell, American animator, production manager and actor (Laugh-O-Gram Studio, Walt Disney Animation Studios, Warner Bros. Cartoons, Metro-Goldwyn-Mayer cartoon studio, animated Oswald the Lucky Rabbit, voiced Bosko), (d. 1987).

=== Date uncertain ===
- Fred Brunish, American painter and animator (Walter Lantz), (d. 1952).
- Enrique Riveron, Cuban-American cartoonist, animator and comics artist (Walt Disney Animation Studios), (d. 1998).
- Brian White, British animator and comics artist (Bonzo the Dog, Jerry the Tyke, Animal Farm), (d. 1984).

== External References ==
- Barrier, Michael (2003), "Warner Bros., 1933-1940", Hollywood Cartoons: American Animation in Its Golden Age, Oxford University Press, ISBN 978-0199839223
- Dobson, Nichola (2010), "Chronology", The A to Z of Animation and Cartoons, Rowman & Littlefield, ISBN 978-0810876231
- Niver, Kemp R. (1985), "Fun in a Bakery Shop", Early Motion Pictures: The Paper Print Collection in the Library of Congress, Motion Picture, Broadcasting, and Recorded Sound Division, Library of Congress, ISBN 978-0844404639
