= A Sheep in the Deep =

- Title card (unrestored)
- Directed by: Chuck Jones; Maurice Noble (co-director)
- Story by: Chuck Jones
- Starring: Mel Blanc
- Edited by: Treg Brown
- Music by: Milt Franklyn
- Animation by: Tom Ray; Ken Harris; Richard Thompson; Bob Bransford
- Layouts by: Maurice Noble; Corny Cole
- Backgrounds by: Philip DeGuard; William Butler
- Color process: Technicolor
- Production company: Warner Bros. Cartoons
- Distributed by: Warner Bros. Pictures
- Release date: February 10, 1962
- Running time: 6 minutes and 10 seconds
- Language: English

A Sheep in the Deep is a 1962 Warner Bros. Merrie Melodies cartoon directed by Chuck Jones and Maurice Noble. The short was released on February 10, 1962, and stars Ralph Wolf and Sam Sheepdog.

Like all Ralph Wolf and Sam Sheepdog shorts, this short is mostly composed of visual gags. Mel Blanc provided for the voices of all the characters. It is the sixth short featuring Ralph Wolf and Sam Sheepdog, as well as the last cartoon featuring Ralph Wolf and Sam Sheepdog to be directed by Jones (their next appearance was in Woolen Under Where, released in 1963 and directed by Phil Monroe and Richard Thompson). It was also the first of the last two cartoons featuring them to be written by Jones (the previous cartoons were written by Michael Maltese, who had already left for Hanna-Barbera in 1959. The second was Woolen Under Where).

== Plot ==
Like all Ralph Wolf and Sam Sheepdog shorts, this one revolves around Ralph Wolf trying to steal the sheep which Sam Sheepdog is guarding. Like Ready, Woolen and Able, this short begins with a juxtaposition of how Ralph and Sam get to work. Sam wakes up at dawn and takes a leisurely stroll to work as Ralph sleeps in and the sun rises. Just as Sam reaches the time clock and lifts his hair to read the time, Ralph's alarm clock goes off, triggering the conveyor system that he uses to get to work. A claw lifts his blanket, his bed tilts, dropping him into a trap door where he falls into the shower. After a second in the shower, a spring below him engages, sending him into a towel and onto a roller skate. As he rides the roller skate down its rail and dries off with the towel, he is fed a slice of toast and coffee. Finally, he grabs his lunch from a hook and rides the roller skate out his front door, down the path, and punches into work before Sam. As always, the two merrily greet each other.

1. Ralph begins with the straightforward approach of sneaking into the field and snatching a sheep. As he walks back, Sam drops a banana peel which Ralph slips on. Instead of falling immediately, Ralph slides around on the banana peel and on his way back Sam snags the stolen sheep with a lasso. As Ralph continues to slide forward, he begins to say "Ooh, I'd like to..." only to hit a tree face-first.

2. This time Ralph digs a hole under Sam and out the side of the cliff face and decides to try to snatch a sheep with a lasso in the same way Sam did in Ralph's last attempt. This is successful, but while Ralph is pulling the sheep up Sam leans over the edge and into Ralph's hole, where he glares at Ralph intimidatingly. Ralph innocently lowers the sheep down, but Sam grabs Ralph by the neck and hits him on the head, propelling him into a tree trunk. As Ralph climbs out of the tree trunk, he resembles a stack of pancakes.

3. Ralph's next plan is to tunnel under Sam, cut out a circle of earth around Sam with a saw, and raise that circle high into the air with a jack. Successful, Ralph ties a dinner napkin around his neck and prepares to steal a sheep. However, as he is doing this, Sam pulls out a corkscrew and removes the piece of earth that the jack is supporting, sending the entire chunk of earth crashing onto Ralph.

4. In Ralph's fourth attempt, he ties himself to a bunch of helium balloons and floats over Sam. Sam calmly pours a box of BB pellets into his mouth and shoots at Ralph's balloons with a blow gun. Ralph is left grasping on to a single balloon, but the knot on the balloon slips and Ralph is projected into Sam. Sam grabs Ralph by the neck and prepares to drop him off the cliff while Ralph starts praying softly. However, before that can happen, the time clock whistle blows and Sam puts Ralph back on the cliff and lets go of him, then the two of them head off for lunch. They enjoy their sandwiches and Sam shares his coffee with Ralph, then they have a smoke break. They both walk back to the cliff, and as soon as the whistle blows to signal the end of lunchtime, Sam grabs Ralph by the neck while holding him over the cliff and finally drops him.

5. Ralph's next plan is to build a large slide behind Sam and dropping a cannonball down the slide. Sam casually points a large spring at the end of the slide, sending the cannonball back up the slide and into Ralph's dropped jaw. Ralph angrily walks away as the cannonball inside his tail weighs him down.

6. Ralph then attempts to use a Warner Bros. Records album set titled "Music To Put Sheep Dogs To Sleep By Warner Bros. Records" to put Sam to sleep. This appears to be successful and Ralph tests to make sure that Sam really is asleep, in much the same way as he tested to make sure Sam could not see him in Double or Mutton. After walking off, stealing a sheep and preparing to eat it, the sheep turns out to be Sam in disguise, also similar to Double or Mutton. However, the two of them continue to remove disguises.

- Ralph turns out to be a sheep,
- Sam turns out to be Ralph,
- The sheep turns out to be Sam,
- Ralph turns out to be a sheep,
- Sam turns out to be Ralph.

Finally, Ralph grabs the sheep by the neck, and the sheep costume collapses. It turns out to have a stick of dynamite inside of it. However, Ralph is saved by the bell when the time clock whistles. Sam walks in off-screen and extinguishes the stick of dynamite by pinching it with his fingers, then says "It's too close to quittin' time, Ralph; let's pick it up there in the morning." The two amicably wish each other good night.

== Crew ==
- Co-Director & Layouts: Maurice Noble
- Animation: Tom Ray, Ken Harris, Richard Thompson & Bob Bransford
- Assistant Layouts: Corny Cole
- Backgrounds: Philip DeGuard & William Butler
- Film Editor: Treg Brown
- Voice Characterizations: Mel Blanc
- Music: Milt Franklyn
- Written & Directed by Chuck Jones

== Home media ==
This short is available on the Looney Tunes: Assorted Nuts Laserdisc. It is available restored on the Looney Tunes Collector's Vault: Volume 2 Blu-ray set.

== See also ==
- List of American films of 1962
- Ralph Wolf and Sam Sheepdog
- Looney Tunes and Merrie Melodies filmography (1960–1969)
