= List of fictional dogs in animation =

This is a list of fictional dogs in animation, and is subsidiary to the list of fictional dogs. It is a collection of various notable dogs that are featured in animated works including traditional animation, stop-motion animation, or CGI/computer animation.

Name	Origins	Breed	Notes
Ace Hart	Dog City	German Shepherd	Private Investigator of Dog City.
Akamaru	Naruto	Pyrenean Mountain Dog	Kiba Inuzuka's pet dog.
Atticus	Infinity Train	Corgi	The ruler of a Corgi kingdom in the Corgi Car.
Alexander	Fullmetal Alchemist	Pyrenean Mountain Dog	Alexander is the family pet of the Tucker family and Nina's closest best friend.
Alpha	Up	Doberman	The leader of Charles Muntz's pack of dogs. Although he has an intimidating appearance, his translating collar usually malfunctions by making his voice to sound high-pitched.
Annabelle	All Dogs Go To Heaven	Whippet	Annabelle is a canine angel who first welcomes Charlie Barkin to Heaven after he is killed by Carface Carruthers. Initially unnamed, the character is identified as Annabelle in the sequel.
Antoinette	Ouran High School Host Club	Golden Retriever	In the manga, the puppy is presented to Tamaki Suoh when he arrives in Japan as a gift to cheer him up and to keep him company. In the anime, she's Tamaki's impulse buy while he and the Hosts are visiting a commoner mall in Ep. 17.
Astro	The Jetsons	Great Dane	Clumsy and dim-witted, but loyal to the Jetsons. He is more advanced than present-day dogs, in that he had a rudimentary grasp of the English language, albeit with r's in many places they should not be, or replacing other letters. For example, "I love you, George" would be "I ruv roo, Reorge".
Augie Doggie and Doggie Daddy	Augie Doggie and Doggie Daddy	Dachshund	The title characters of the show.
Bad Bob	Rex the Runt		A plasticine dog who is featured on the telly.
Bandit	Jonny Quest	Bulldog	Bandit is a bulldog and the pet of the Quest family, named for the mask-like markings around his eyes.
Bandit Heeler	Bluey	Blue Heeler	Chilli's husband, Bluey and Bingo's father.
Balto	Balto	Siberian Husky cross Wolf	Led his team of sled dogs on the final leg of the 1925 sled run across Alaska to transport diphtheria antitoxin and combat an outbreak of the disease. Balto is based on the real-life dog of the same name, who was a purebred Husky. He is voiced by Kevin Bacon in the first movie and Maurice LaMarche in the sequels.
Barney	Barney	Old English Sheepdog	Anthropomorphized dog who lives in a house. His best mouse friend Roger lives in his hairy crop of fur on his head.
The Beagle Boys	Scrooge McDuck universe, DuckTales	Beagle	Created by Carl Barks, they are a gang of criminals who constantly try to rob Scrooge McDuck.
Belle	Belle and Sebastian	Pyrenean Mountain Dog	Belle ("Jolly" in the Japanese version) escaped into the French countryside. She is gentle and warmhearted, but her attempts to help those in need are misunderstood. She is labeled "The White Monster" and the police are constantly on her tail.
Beta	Dream Hunter Rem		Rem's pet puppy, who acts as support by transforming into a large wild dog when needed. Beta has the ability to track ghosts and spirits.
Benny	Top Dog and the Gang	Chihuahua	He is a blue Chihuahua.
Betty Boop	Fleischer Studios	Poodle	Grim Natwick's creation, Betty Boop, first appeared as a supporting character to Bimbo in Dizzy Dishes in 1930. Betty Boop was first created as an anthropomorphic poodle before evolving into human form.
Bimbo	Fleischer Studios	Boston Terrier	Bimbo first appeared in Fleischer's Out of the Inkwell series and was originally named Fitz. He later became the star of Fleischer's Talkartoons series, making his first appearance as Bimbo in Hot Dog (1930). Bimbo was relegated to a supporting character when his girlfriend, then drawn as a dog, Betty Boop became a more popular character.
Bingo Heeler	Bluey	Red Heeler	Bandit and Chilli's youngest daughter, Bluey's younger sister.
Bitzer	Shaun the Sheep	Sheepdog	Bitzer is the farmer's loyal, long-suffering Herding dog, dressed for work in a blue knit cap, black collar, knitted wristlet and large official-looking wrist-watch, carrying a clipboard and walking upright or on all fours as needed. He communicates, canine-fashion, via barks, growls, and the occasional whimper. He also gives instructions to the flock by blowing a whistle. Despite a tendency to be caught out listening to music, he takes his job very seriously, to the point of occasionally letting his power go to his head. He is however a generally good friend to Shaun and does his best to keep the whole flock out of trouble.
Black Hayate	Fullmetal Alchemist	Shiba Inu	Black Hayate is Riza Hawkeye's pet Shiba Inu puppy.
Blitz	Road Rovers	Doberman	Blitz is one of several dogs who were given anthropomorphic forms to combat General Parvo. His razor sharp teeth and claws can cut through anything. Blitz has romantic feelings for Colleen, often met only with feigned oblivion, often followed in short order by physical violence on her part.
Blue	Blue's Clues		A blue-spotted, blue-colored puppy. Every episode, she plays a game in which she tries to communicate something by leaving paw prints on three clues.
Bluey Heeler	Bluey	Blue Heeler	An anthropomorphic six-year-old (later seven-year old) Blue Heeler puppy who is characterised by her abundance of energy, imagination and curiosity of the world. Bandit and Chilli's oldest daughter, Bingo's sister.
Bob Heeler	Bluey	Blue Heeler	Radley, Bandit and Stripe's father, Bluey, Bingo, Muffin and Socks' paternal grandfather.
Bolivar	Mickey Mouse	St. Bernard	A non-anthropomorphic St. Bernard dog belonging to Donald Duck. Features on the Disney shorts Alpine Climbers and More Kittens.
Bolt	Bolt	White Shepherd	Bolt is a fictional White Shepherd and the eponymous protagonist of the 2008 animated feature film Bolt. In the film, he is voiced by John Travolta. His journey and the personal evolution it provokes in him is core to the film's main themes.
Booster	RoboGobo	Husky	A member of team RoboGobo, his Robo-suit gains him robo-speed, and Allie's love interest.
Boot	The Perishers	Old English Sheepdog	He lives with his boy, Wellington.
Brain	Inspector Gadget		Inspector Gadget's and Penny's faithful pet dog and companion.
Brain	Top Dog and the Gang	Standard Schnauzer	He is an orange Standard Schnauzer.
Brandy Cattle	Bluey	Red Heeler	Chilli's sister, Bluey and Bingo's maternal aunt.
Brandy	Brandy & Mr. Whiskers	Mongrel	An anthropomorphic mixed breed dog. Her age is unknown as there is no mention of this in the series at any point.
Brian	Family Guy	Labrador Retriever	A member of the Griffin family. He primarily works in the series as a struggling writer attempting essays, books, novels, screenplays and newspaper articles.
Bruno	Cinderella	Bloodhound	A crimson bloodhound dog belong to Cinderella. He turned into a human footman for taking Cinderella to the ball by her Fairy Godmother.
Bubble Puppy	Bubble Guppies		Gil's pet puppy and best friend.
Buford	Buford and the Galloping Ghost	Bloodhound	Buford is a smart but sleepy bloodhound who teams up with two teenagers, Cindy Mae and her older brother Woody, and the trio solves confusing mysteries that baffle Sheriff Muletrain Pettigrew and Goofer McGee. Buford's abilities are expanded with ears that revolve like radar dishes, and his nose responds to clues like a geiger counter. He also howls his heart out when the moon comes out and has a running feud with a brown raccoon.
Buddy	Bluey	Pug	Good friends with Bingo and the rest of the kids in Mrs Retriever's kindy class. He is a loud breather and is often seen picking his nose, falling asleep at the top of the slide, or staring into space at nothing at all.
Bullet	Paradise PD	German Shepherd	Bullet is the Paradise PD's drug dog.He is addicted to the confiscated drugs.
Buttons	Animaniacs	German Shepherd	A dog that takes care of Mindy. He will follow Mindy where ever she goes trying to keep her out of trouble, which she is always getting into. Buttons tries desperately to keep Mindy safe and he always succeeds, except he gets hurt and in trouble himself with Mindy's mom (and on rare occasions with her dad).
Byron Basset	Tiny Toon Adventures	Basset Hound	A slow, lazy dog who turns around by retracting his head and tail into his body and out the other side.
Calypso	Bluey	Australian Shepherd	Bluey's teacher.
Cecil	Hickory, Dickory, and Doc		
Cezar	Castlevania animated series	Pug	Cezar is Hector's reanimated pet dog in the Castlevania animated series. It is a black zombie pug with one eye missing and the other appears to glow a faint blue color, probably related to its undead status.
Charles	The Loud House	American Pit Bull Terrier	Charles is the Loud family's pet dog. He was adopted into the family when Lana found him and cried until they agreed to keep him. Although he generally does not play a large role, Charles makes frequent cameo appearances throughout the series.
Charlie Barkin	All Dogs Go To Heaven	German Shepherd	A gambling, rugged, but still lovable German Shepherd.
Charlie Dog	Little Orphan Airedale	Mongrel	Created by Chuck Jones who often pesters Porky Pig to be his owner.
Chase	Paw Patrol	German Shepherd	Police officer pup that covers searching, safeguarding and excavation.
Chilli Heeler	Bluey	Red Heeler	Bandit's wife, Bluey and Bingo's mum.
Chloe	Bluey	Dalmatian	Bluey's best friend.
Christine Heeler	Bluey	Blue Heeler	Radley, Bandit and Stripe's mother, Bluey, Bingo, Muffin and Socks' paternal grandmother.
Chucky	Bluey	Golden Retriever	Pat and Janelle's youngest son, Lucky's brother, Bluey and Bingo's neighbourhood friend.
Choo-Choo	Top Dog and the Gang	Dachshund	He is a pink Dachshund.
Clifford	Clifford the Big Red Dog		
Coco	Bluey	Poodle	Bluey's friend.
Colleen	Road Rovers	Rough Collie	Colleen is one of several dogs who were given anthropomorphic forms to combat General Parvo. She is skilled in martial arts and is a trained medic.
Corneil	Watch My Chops!		Corneil is a very intelligent dog that has the ability to speak, read, write, walk on two paws, etc. But he keeps his brilliance a secret (except for his dog-sitter Bernie) in fear that he may lose his simple dog life and be experimented on. His owners are very wealthy; as he lives in an extravagant home in the city. Corneil can be arrogant and very cunning to get what he wants. He tends to challenge his brain through playing chess with computers, plays the violin in his spare time, and is very artistic.
Courage	Courage the Cowardly Dog		An easily frightened dog who lives in Nowhere, Kansas. Most sources say that he is a beagle (just like Snoopy from Peanuts), but others claim that he is a mutt or some sort of terrier.
Cujo	Danny Phantom		A well-intentioned and eager ghost, Cujo is able to slip out of the ghost zone at will, trying to retrieve his lost toy. Although typically a small, cuddly-looking spirit, when aggravated he grows significantly in size and certainly spooks some. Appears previously trained due to work at Axon Labs as a guard dog. (Named after the Stephen King novel Cujo, about a dog who was bitten by a bat and went crazy.)
Danny Dog	Peppa Pig		One of Peppa's friends.
Dante	Coco	Xoloitzcuintli	Miguel's dog.
Deputy Dawg	Deputy Dawg		An anthropomorphized deputy sheriff in the Mississippi bayous of the United States.
Digger	Bluey	Red Kelpie	Rusty's oldest brother
Dinah the Dachshund	The Sleepwalker	Dachshund	Pluto's affectionate and compassionate love interest.
Dog	CatDog		Very fun-loving and enjoys chasing garbage trucks, chasing cars, and exploring many things in which Cat does not want to take part.
Dog	Footrot Flats: The Dog's Tale	Border Collie	He has a real name but despises it and does not allow anyone to reveal it
Dog	WordWorld		Dog is one of the main WordFriends in WordWorld.
Dog	Family Dog	Bull Terrier	A bull terrier simply called "the dog", who often gets into trouble with the family.
Dogbert	Dilbert	Beagle	Dilbert's evil genius dog
Doggie	King of the Hill	West Highland White Terrier	The Souphanousinphone' family dog.
Dogmatix (Idefix)	Asterix	Terrier	Obelix's minuscule dog.
Doki	Doki		A curious dog whose love of adventure makes crazy situations no problem for him.
Don	Van Beuren Studios		A short statured dog who is the best buddy of Waffles the cat.
Doxie Dachshund	Oswald the Lucky Rabbit	Dashshund	The second pet dog of Oswald after Elmer the great dane.
Dougal	The Magic Roundabout		This main character was a Skye terrier (also called Pollux in the French version) 1965 to 1977 revived 2006 to 2007.
Dougie	Bluey	Cavapoo	Bingo's friend who is a deaf character and use Auslan to communicate.
Droopy	Droopy	Basset Hound	From cartoons created by Tex Avery for MGM. A master detective who keeps showing up no matter where criminals run off to.
Dudley	T.U.F.F. Puppy	Mongrel	He is the very heart and soul of T.U.F.F. even though he's an airheaded and hyperactive, white and black, mixed-breed, dog who usually wears nothing more than a shirt.
Dug	Up	Golden Retriever	A golden retriever who can communicate with humans through a device on his collar.
Duggee	Hey Duggee	Labrador Retriever	A friendly big brown male dog and the leader of the Squirrel club.
Dukey	Johnny Test		Anthropomorphic mutt owned by Johnny.
Dusty	Bluey	Red Kelpie	Rusty's youngest sister
Dynomutt	Blue Falcon		
Ein	Cowboy Bebop	Welsh Corgi	
Ellie	Family Guy	Saluki	She is a dog Brian falls in love with, in the episode "Boy (Dog) Meets Girl (Dog)".
Elsa	HouseBroken	Pembroke Welsh Corgi	Elsa is a main character and acts as second-in-command with the therapy group run in the show, frequently trying to be as good as Honey and always making sure she's always right.
Everest	Paw Patrol	Husky	Purple-hued husky pup who operates in heavy work and snow-based emergencies.
Exile	Road Rovers	Siberian Husky	Exile is one of several dogs who were given anthropomorphic forms to combat General Parvo. He is friendly and easygoing, but often clashes with Blitz. Exile possesses superhuman strength as well as heat, ice, and night vision.
Fancy-Fancy	Top Dog and the Gang	Husky	He is an orange Husky.
Fifi	Open Season	Poodle	Though having a feminine name, he is a male poodle. Fifi serves as the antagonist in Open Season 2. In Open Season 3, he became an ally to his former enemies.
Fleegle	The Banana Splits	Beagle	A dog who is the guitarist of the Banana Splits.
Frisky Heeler	Bluey	Cocker Spaniel	Radley's wife, Bluey and Bingo's paternal aunt
Fu Dog	American Dragon: Jake Long	Shar-Pei	A magical dog who is best friends with Jake. He is voiced by John DiMaggio.
Gaspard and Lisa	Gaspard and Lisa		Two best friends who engage in numerous adventures.
Ginger	Winx Club	Poodle	Ginger is Stella's fairy pet, a teacup poodle.
Goliath	Davey and Goliath		A dog with audible thoughts, companion dog to Davey
Goddard	Jimmy Neutron		Mechanical dog, built by his owner Jimmy Neutron.
Goofy	Mickey Mouse universe	Black and Tan Coonhound	Friend of Mickey Mouse. A tall, anthropomorphic dog with a Southern drawl.
Goopy Geer	Merrie Melodies		A tall, lanky humanoid dog with scruffy whiskers and long, expressive ears.
Gorga	The Zula Patrol		Gorga is the Zula Patrol's space pet.
Gromit	A Grand Day Out	Beagle	Wallace's mute, sensible and scientific assistant.
Ham and Ex	I Haven't Got a Hat	St. Bernard	A pair of St. Bernard pups. They at times served as Beans' nephews.
Hachi/Ichi	Doraemon: Nobita in the Wan-Nyan Spacetime Odyssey		Ichi also known as Hachi is a dog that was once owned by Nobita.
Honey	Bluey	Beagle	Bluey's friend.
Hong Kong Phooey	Hong Kong Phooey		An anthropomorphic dog who uses Chinese martial arts to fight crime, he's also known as the janitor Penry.
Huckleberry Hound	Huckleberry Hound	Bluetick Coonhound	A blue dog that speaks with a Southern drawl and has a relaxed, sweet, and well-intentioned personality. He first appeared in the series The Huckleberry Hound Show, and was also a star of a television film The Good, the Bad, and Huckleberry Hound. Huckleberry Hound's southern drawl and laid back mannerisms bear close resemblance to the character "Southern Wolf" in the MGM cartoons including those produced by Hanna and Barbera.
Hunter	Road Rovers	Golden Retriever mix	Hunter is the leader of the Road Rovers and one of several dogs who were given anthropomorphic forms to combat General Parvo. He possesses super speed, and is prone to listing a range of other "powers" such as super-loyalty, super-trust, and super-luck. He and Colleen have romantic feelings for each other.
Hector the Bulldog	Peck Up Your Troubles	Bulldog	A muscle-bound bulldog with gray fur and walks pigeon-toed. His face bears a perpetual scowl between two immense jowls. He wears a black collar with silver studs.
Indy	Bluey	Afghan Hound	Bluey's friend.
Iggy	Jojo's Bizarre Adventure	Boston Terrier	A boston terrier, Iggy is an ally of Jotaro Kujo in part 3 of Jojo's Bizarre Adventure Stardust Crusaders. His stand, The Fool, is a mechanical being that is able to manipulate sand and dust.
Itchy	All Dogs Go to Heaven	Dachshund	A dachshund who is Charlie's best friend.
Jack Russell	Bluey	Jack Russell Terrier	Rusty's best friend, Bluey's friend.
Jake	Adventure Time		Finn's sidekick, pet and adoptive brother.
Janelle	Bluey	Golden Retriever	Pat's wife, Lucky and Chucky's mother, Bandit, Chilli, Bluey and Bingo's neighbourhood friend.
Jasper	Family Guy	Labrador Retriever	Brian's gay cousin.
Jasper G	Bluey	Dobermann	Jasper W's best friend, Bingo's friend.
Jasper W	Bluey	Rottweiler	Jasper G's best friend, Bingo's friend.
Jenna	Balto	Siberian Husky	Jenna is Balto's mate and mother of Kodi, Dingo, Saba and Aleu. She was voiced by Bridget Fonda in the first movie, and Jodi Benson in the sequels.
Jerry the Tyke	Jerry the Tyke		A black and white dog from the silent era of British animation. Jerry is aware that he is a cartoon creation and interacts with his animator.
Josef	Alps no Shoujo Heidi	St. Bernard	The extremely lazy, but stout and reliable dog of Heidi's grandfather, the Alm-Öhi. He is an original supporting character exclusively created for the series, and does not appear in Johanna Spyri's story on which it is based.
Judo	Bluey	Chow Chow	Wendy's daughter, Bluey and Bingo's neighbourhood friend.
Junkers	Junkers Come Here	Schnauzer	A talking schnauzer that grants three wishes to his owner Hiromi Nozawa.
Kipper	Kipper the Dog		Kipper is warm-hearted, friendly and curious.
K-9	Looney Tunes		K-9 is Marvin the Martian's pet alien dog
Kyle	Despicable Me		Gru's ferocious, black, grey-eyed pet dog of an unknown species, which has the personality of a bulldog and the fang-like teeth of a piranha. At first, Kyle won't hesitate to take a bite of anything that looks food to him, also hates to be hugged by Agnes. Along with Gru, Kyle warms up over the course of the film; at the end, Kyle ends up not minding about sleeping with the girls, especially Agnes.
Lady	Lady and the Tramp	Cocker Spaniel	A beautiful female Cocker Spaniel, who lives with her pet owners Jim Dear and Darling.
Ladybird	King of the Hill	Bloodhound	The Hills' fourteen-year-old purebred Bloodhound. Her companionship temporarily relieved Hank's stress (and narrow urethra), allowing him to impregnate Peggy.
Lila	Bluey	Maltese	Bingo's best friend.
Loyal Heart Dog	Care Bears		One of the Care Bear Cousins. He has blue fur with a white heart-shaped patch over one eye, and his tummy symbol is a red heart-shaped medal.
Lucky	Pound Puppies	Golden Retriever/German Shepherd	Lucky is the leader of the Shelter 17 Pound Puppies unit. He is the main character of the series. Lucky is a Golden Retriever/German Shepherd mix. His job is to find homes for stray dogs. He is an alpha male, who has a calm and professional attitude. He secretly loves Cookie, a Boxer mix.
Lucky	Bluey	Golden Retriever	Pat and Janelle's oldest son, Chucky's brother, Bandit, Chilli, Bluey and Bingo's neighbourhood friend.
Luiz	Rio	Bulldog	A bulldog who helps Blu and Jewel.
Mackenzie	Bluey	Border Collie	An adventurous Border Collie who is Bluey's friend from school, and originally from New Zealand.
Magenta	Blue's Clues		Magenta is Miranda's pet and Blue's next-door neighbor and best friend. Magenta looks exactly like Blue, except she's a magenta color with darker magenta spots and a dark magenta nose.
Marc Antony	Feed the Kitty	Bulldog	Marc Antony is a burly bulldog that is usually brown with a tan belly and black ears, though his coloration varies in few shorts. Mostly he provides love and protection for the little kitten Pussyfoot but is an opponent in Go Fly a Kit.
Missy	Bluey	Australian Terrier	One of Bluey and Bingo's friends. She is in Mrs. Retriever's kindy class. Initially a shy and nervous young girl who felt terrified when playing games, she has come out of her shell in her quest to become braver. She is implied to have been adopted, due to her mother being a German Spitz and no father appearing in the show.
Mort Cattle	Bluey	Red Heeler	Brandy and Chilli's father, Bluey and Bingo's maternal grandfather
Mr. Peabody	The Rocky and Bullwinkle Show	Beagle	Genius dog and history expert.
Mr.Pickles	Mr.Pickles	Border Collie	Mr.Pickles is a satanic dog who murders and mutilates numerous victims. He has an underground lair beneath his doghouse.
Mr. Tadakichi	Azumanga Daioh	Great Pyrenees	Chiyo Mihama's pet Great Pyrenees.
Ms. Lion	Spider-Man and His Amazing Friends	Lhasa Apso	A pet of Firestar.
Muffin Heeler	Bluey	White Heeler	Socks's sister, Stripe and Trixie's oldest daughter, Bluey and Bingo's cousin
Muttley	Wacky Races	Mongrel	Muttley is an anthropomorphic dog (according to the original Wacky Races narrator, a combination of bloodhound, pointer and hunting dog). He is the mostly faithful sidekick of Dick Dastardly.
Marshall	Paw Patrol	Dalmatian	Firefighting pup that also covers emergency medical treatment. He is well known by his clumsy character.
Max	The Secret Life of Pets	Jack Russell Terrier	Katie's dog who lives in an apartment in New York City.
Max Goof	Goof Troop/A Goofy Movie/An Extremely Goofy Movie	Black and Tan Coonhound	Son of Goofy
Muzzle	Road Rovers	Rottweiler	Muzzle, formerly named Scout, is the pet of Professor Shepherd, the overseer of the Road Rovers. He was previously experimented on by General Parvo and driven insane, leading him to be restrained at all times.
Nana	Peter Pan	Newfoundland	Pet of the Darling family and the children's nursemaid. Portrayed as a St. Bernard in later adaptations
Nero	Urban Vermin	Chihuahua	A scientifically enhanced cybernetic chihuahua. Zity decided to enhance him, to make him better, stronger, faster... But he is on GLF's side. He first appeared in "Dog of War".
New Brian	Family Guy	Border Collie	A minor character, intended to replace Brian in the episode "The Man with Two Brians". He met his unfortunate end after Stewie found out about his teddy bear, Rupert, being raped.
Odie	Garfield	Dachshund	He is Garfield's best friend, and a kind but (slightly) unintelligent yellow-furred, brown-eared beagle/dachshund mix.
Ootsie and Bootsie Snootie	PB&J Otter	Poodles	
Pal	Arthur	Golden Retriever mix English Setter	Arthur Read's pet dog. He is a Golden Retriever/English Setter mix.
Pat	Bluey	Golden Retriever	Janelle's husband, Lucky and Chucky's father, Bandit, Chilli, Bluey and Bingo's neighbourhood friend.
Mr. Peanutbutter	BoJack Horseman	Labrador Retriever	An anthropomorphic Labrador Retriever who is BoJack's former sitcom rival and Diane's boyfriend (and later husband). He loves BoJack almost like a brother and, despite their rivalry, admires him for his work on Horsin' Around. He's as energetic and friendly as any dog.
Penelope	Blinky Bill’s Extraordinary Balloon Adventure	Poodle	She is a pink Poodle from France. Blinky and his friends first meet Penelope when she was a rope-dancer in the Circus Brothers' Circus. Blinky rescues her along with the other circus animals and she travels with him around the world.
Peter Puppy	Earthworm Jim	Not specified	Peter is an anthropomorphic dog and the sidekick of Earthworm Jim. He was once an ordinary dog before being possessed by a demon, which gave him anthropomorphism, sapience, and the capability of speech, but causes him to transform into a monstrous form resembling the demon whenever he is hurt or scared.
Perdita	101 Dalmatians	Dalmatian	Anita's pet, mother to 15 puppies and adoptive mother to 84 other dalmatian puppies.
Peridot	Jewelpet	Papillon	A yellow and green Papillon who symbolizes dream fulfillment. She wears a green hairclip shaped like a butterfly, and a yellow and green flower garland around her neck. Usually depending on the series, she is more notable due to her bilingual skills and athletics.
Pinkie	Pinkie Cooper	Cocker Spaniel	An anthropomorphic Cocker Spaniel, who is obsessed with everything fashion and is the founder of the Pinkie Post website.
Pluto	Mickey Mouse universe	Mongrel	He is a light brown (most recently yellow), medium-sized, short-haired dog. Unlike Goofy, Pluto is not anthropomorphic beyond some characteristics such as facial expression. He is most often the companion of Mickey Mouse, although he first appeared as Minnie Mouse's dog Rover in the film The Picnic (1930).
Pompompurin	Sanrio	Golden Retriever	He is a beige-colored Golden Retriever that usually wears a brown beret that resembles pudding (flan).
Pom Pom	Bluey	Pomeranian	Bluey and Bingo's friend
Pongo	101 Dalmatians	Dalmatian	Roger's pet, father to 15 puppies and adoptive father to 84 other dalmatian puppies.
Porkchop	Doug	Bull Terrier	Porkchop is Doug Funnie's dog and best friend. He doesn't speak but acts like human in that he walks upright and has human-like mannerisms.
Pretzel	Bluey	Chihuahua	A student in Bluey's class. Initially depicted as moody to play with his friends, he eventually becomes open to playing with them after seeing his classmates work together. He has a pet guinea pig that ran away. His parentage is unknown, but dialogue in "The Sign" shows that he is implied to have two mothers; this would make them the first LGBTQ+ characters in the series.
Pudgy	Betty Boop		Pudgy is a white little puppy with black spots and he was first seen in Betty Boop's Little Pal in 1934. Pudgy was created by Myron Waldman while at Fleischer Studios. Pudgy makes his last appearance in the 1938 Betty Boop short entitled The Foxy Hunter alongside Betty's nephew (Junior).
Pufferty	Tickety Toc		Pufferty is a dog train hybrid that is happy to drive the people behind the clock to wherever they want.
Ren	The Ren & Stimpy Show	Chihuahua	Ren is a psychotic Chihuahua who lives with his best friend Stimpy, a Manx cat.
Radley Heeler	Bluey	Mix Red & Blue Heeler	Bandit's oldest brother, Bluey and Bingo's paternal uncle
Rex	Paw Patrol	Bernese Mountain Dog	A dog that takes care of the dinosaur-based missions, and is handicapped.
Rex	Rex the Runt	Generic	A mauve-colored plasticine dog who goes on adventures on the telly with his friends.
Rocket	Shimmer and Shine	Beagle	Zac's pet hound dog who appears in most Season 1 episodes of the show and made cameos in the CGI seasons
Rollo	The Animals of Farthing Wood (TV series)	St. Bernard	An English Mastiff in the books, but in the television series he is a St. Bernard.
Rowlf the Dog	The Muppets		A brown dog who plays the piano.
Reddy	The Ruff & Reddy Show		A good-natured and brave (but not overly bright) dog voiced by Daws Butler.
Rump	Dino Squad	Bull Terrier	A mischievous dog
Ruff Ruffman	Fetch! with Ruff Ruffman	Mongrel	Ruff Ruffman is a chubby bespectacled orange dog who is the proud host of the titular game show, FETCH! with Ruff Ruffman. He works alongside Blossom the cat and Chet the mouse to run the game show to tell Fetchers on the show what to do and what topics are being discussed. Ruff is a mutt and is proud of it.
Rocky	Paw Patrol	Mongrel	Mixed-breed pup that takes part in repairing jobs and likes recycling. Credited as the recycling pup.
Roxanne	A Goofy Movie		Max's girlfriend, whom he tries to impress.
Roxie McTerrier	Littlest Pet Shop: A World of Our Own	Boston Terrier	A Boston Terrier with a seal coat who cares a lot about her friends. She loves to have fun and eat food, as well as Roxie has a crush on Austin Goldenpup.
Rubble	Paw Patrol	Bulldog	Builder pup, operates in construction operations.
Ruffy	Timmy Time		Ruffy is one of the main characters of Timmy Time.
Rusty	Bluey	Red Kelpie	Jack Russel's best friend, Bluey's friend.
Sam Sheepdog	Don't Give Up the Sheep	Sheepdog	A large, burly Berger the Brie (Briard Sheepdog) with white or tan fur and mop of red hair that usually covers his eyes. He very rarely runs and tends to be sedentary in his movements. He does, however, possess sufficient strength to incapacitate Ralph with a single punch once he catches him.
Santa's Little Helper	The Simpsons	Greyhound	He is the pet greyhound of the Simpson family. The dog was introduced in the first episode of the show, the 1989 Christmas special "Simpsons Roasting on an Open Fire", in which his owner abandons him for finishing last in a greyhound race. Homer Simpson and his son Bart, who are at the race track in hope of earning some money for Christmas presents, see this and decide to adopt the dog.
Sapphie	Jewelpet	Cavalier King Charles sSaniel	A yellow and blue Cavalier King Charles Spaniel who symbolizes friendship. She wears a pink and blue flower tiara and a necklace shaped like a blue Treble Clef. The highest ranking Jewelpet in Jewel Land magic-wise, She is friendly and also studious, being a very good scientist and magician at the same time. One of the three main characters of the series.
Scooby-Doo	Scooby-Doo	Great Dane	The title character in the Scooby-Doo animated television series created by the popular American animation company Hanna-Barbera. Scooby-Doo is the male dog and lifelong companion of Shaggy Rogers and in many iterations, including the original series, is regarded as a unique Great Dane dog who is able to speak in broken English, unlike most other dogs in his reality, and usually puts the letter R in front of words spoken.
Scooby-Dum	Scooby-Doo	Great Dane	Scooby-Dum is a supporting character in The Scooby-Doo Show, voiced by Daws Butler. Scooby-Dum, a Blue Merle Great Dane with spots and buck teeth is Scooby-Doo's slow-witted cousin/brother (his lineage is dubious because Shaggy has said that he is his brother on one occasion but also his cousin, though it is most likely that they are cousins). In the episode "The Chiller Diller Movie Thriller", his cousin Scooby-Dee stars.
Scrappy Cornelius Doo	Scooby-Doo	Great Dane	A puppy created by Hanna-Barbera Productions in 1979, with the famous catchphrase Let Me At 'Em and is the nephew of Hanna-Barbera cartoon star Scooby-Doo. Scrappy has appeared in a number of the various incarnations of the Scooby-Doo cartoon series.
Scud	Toy Story	Bull Terrier	Sid Phillips' vicious Bull Terrier who destroys toys.
Seymour	Futurama	Border Terrier	Philip J. Fry's dog from the 20th Century
Shag	Road Rovers	Old English Sheepdog	A sheepdog who is a member of the Road Rovers. Unlike the other members of the group, Shag is not fully anthropomorphic and is incapable of speech.
Sharky	Eek! the Cat		A shark-dog hybrid, who has greater dog characteristics.
Shiro	Crayon Shin-chan	Maltese	Shiro is a white pup Shin-chan found in a cardboard box and later adopted by the Noharas. Shiro and Shin-chan are born in the same year, which means that they are both 5 years old.
Shishimaru	Ninja Hattori-kun	Terrier	Shishimaru is one of the main characters in Ninja Hatttori-kun. He is Hattori and Shinzo's dog.
Skye	Paw Patrol	Cockapoo	A pup that provides aerial support and transport.
Slinky Dog	Toy Story	Dachshund	Slinky Dog (better known as Slinky) is a supporting character in the Toy Story franchise. He is a toy dachshund who speaks with a graveled Southern accent.
Slip	Shaun the Sheep Movie		Slip is a character in the 2015 stop-motion film Shaun the Sheep Movie.
Slap T. Pooch	Oh Yeah! Cartoons		
Snickers	Bluey	Dachshund	Bluey's friend.
Snoopy	Peanuts	Beagle	Charlie Brown's pet dog
Snowy	Tintin	Wire Fox Terrier	Tintin's companion in all his adventures. Clever and high IQ white Wire Fox Terrier that helps Tintin out of pinches
Snuffles "Snowball"	Rick and Morty	Maltese	The Smith's pet dog, who becomes self-aware after Rick gives him a device that makes him intelligent. He is inspired by Justin Roiland's dog, Jerry, who is a Maltese.
Socks Heeler	Bluey	Blue Heeler	Muffin's sister, Stripe and Trixie's youngest daughter, and Bluey and Bingo's cousin
Spike	Tom and Jerry	Bulldog	Often beats Tom up.
Sparky	The Fairly OddParents		Sparky is a fairy dog that joined Timmy Turner and his fairy family in Season 9. He was introduced on the Season 9 premiere episode, "Fairly OddPet", becoming a new addition to the show's main cast.
Spank	Ohayō! Spank		A main character of the series.
Spike	Rugrats	Hound	Spike is the Pickles family pet. Tommy claims him to be his best "animal" friend. It is mentioned that his breed is the fictional Siberian Tiger Hound, which is in universe an extremely rare and highly valuable breed of dog worth thousands of dollars.
Spot Helperman/Scott Leadready II	Teacher's Pet		
Spook	Top Dog and the Gang	St. Bernard	He is a green St. Bernard
Spunky	Rocko's Modern Life	Bull Terrier	Spunky is Rocko's Bull Terrier, and a main character of Rocko's Modern Life.
Stripe Heeler	Bluey	Blue Heeler	Bandit's youngest brother, Bluey and Bingo's paternal uncle
Stu	Littlest Pet Shop		Stu is one of the five diminute animals who live in the eponymous fictional pet shop. He is a bumbling, gluttonous blue dog who wears a green cap and he has black floppy ears.
Tyke	Tom and Jerry	Bulldog	Spike's son from the cartoons.
Tetsunoshin	Tetsunoshin	Poodle	Tetsunoshin is a male toy poodle. His owner is Rumi Inuyama and Tetsunoshin is the main character of this series. He and his family lived in Kyushu prior to moving to Hoppongi Hills in Tokyo.
Toby	Toby the Pup		A dog created by former Fleischer employees, hence the character's close similarity to Bimbo.
Tomato Telerin	Cleo & Cuquin	Bulldog	Cleo's family dog.
Towser	Towser	Terrier	Based on books published by Anderson Press, the children's television show released in fall of 1984 was narrated by Roy Kinnear and featured a dog with a bull terrier appearance.
Topaz	Jewelpet	Yorkshire Terrier	A grey and brown Yorkshire Terrier who symbolizes radiance (confidence in the case of the first series). She wears a light purple bow and a purple jewel necklace. Unlike many Jewelpets, she has long hair.
Top Dog	Top Dog and the Gang	Border Collie	He is a yellow Border Collie and he is the leader of the gang.
Tracker	Paw Patrol	Chihuahua	A pup that works in a jungle that has extreme hearing capability.
Tramp	Lady and the Tramp	Mongrel	A stray dog who lives on the streets and becomes Lady's love interest.
Trixie Heeler	Bluey	White Heeler	Stripe's wife and Bluey and Bingo's paternal aunt.
Two Curious Puppies	Merrie Melodies	Boxer	A golden boxer with brown ears and a cocker spaniel, white with black patches and a docked tail. They are part-time friends and part-time opponents.
Underdog	Underdog	Beagle	An anthropomorphic superhero. The premise was that "humble and lovable" Shoeshine Boy, a cartoon dog, was in truth the superhero Underdog. George S. Irving narrated, and comedy actor Wally Cox provided the voices of both Underdog and Shoeshine Boy.
Vince	Rex the Runt		A plasticine dog who suffers from Random Pavarotti Disease.
Vinny	Family Guy	Hound	Vinny is a dog purchased by the Griffins at Quahog Pets as a replacement for Brian in "Life of Brian" following Brian's death. Vinny is a "pussy hound" who claims to be 1/16th cat. Due to Brian's death being averted two episodes later, Vinny never replaces him, but he is slated to return sometime later.
Weed	Ginga Densetsu Weed	Akita mix Kishu	Weed is the protagonist of Ginga Densetsu Weed. Weed is a brindle Akita-Kishu mix with the fur color silver and with blue eyes.
Wendy	Rex the Runt		A female plasticine dog who has adventures on the telly.
Wendy	Bluey	Chow Chow	Judo's mum, Bandit, Chilli, Bluey and Bingo's neighbourhood friend.
Wordsworth	Jamie and the Magic Torch	Old English Sheepdog	An Old English Sheepdog that could speak, in a West Country accent, when in Cuckoo Land.
Wowser	Wowser	Bobtail	Based on the Belgian comics series Cubitus by Dupa.
Winston	Feast	Boston Terrier	A Boston Terrier who loves to eat
Winton	Bluey	Bulldog	Bluey's friend.
Winona	My Little Pony: Friendship Is Magic	Shepherd dog	Applejack's pet.
Zed	Ben 10: Omniverse		Zed is an Anubian Baskurr, an alien which resembles a cross between a dog and a reptile, with some feline features. Originally the hunting dog of the villain Khyber, Zed is later abandoned by him and subsequently adopted by Kevin Levin.
Zuma	Paw Patrol	Chocolate Labrador	A pup particularly operates in water-based missions, although sometimes work as the backup and helping hand in various missions.
Zoe Trent	Littlest Pet Shop	Cavalier King Charles Spaniel	A purple Cavalier King Charles Spaniel; she is most famous for being fashionable and loves singing. Her owners are John and Clarissa, and her little sister is Gail.
Zwei	RWBY	Cardigan Welsh Corgi	Ruby Rose and Yang Xiao-Long's pet, a valuable resource in combat, shown to be quite effective taking down the towering beasts known as Grimm.
