= British animation =

Animation made in United Kingdom

Animation in the United Kingdom began at the very origins of the art form in the late 19th century. British animation has been strengthened by an influx of émigrés to the UK; renowned animators such as Lotte Reiniger (Germany), John Halas (Hungary), George Dunning and Richard Williams (Canada), Ray Harryhausen, Terry Gilliam and Tim Burton (United States) have all worked in the UK at various stages of their careers. Notable full-length animated features to be produced in the UK include Animal Farm (1954), Yellow Submarine (1968), Watership Down (1978), and Wallace & Gromit: The Curse of the Were-Rabbit (2005).

== Conceptualizing British animation history ==
The history of British animation has gone through several stages of development, significantly influenced by both internal and international political, economic, and cultural factors. Important among these is the relative impact of the international animation industry, which in several instances has been seen as both a challenge to produce more local content, and as a creative and/or commercial inspiration to follow or work against.

To clarify the emergence and interplay of the different agendas, aesthetics, and industrial relationships that have shaped British animation history, media scholar Van Norris posits a rough chronological taxonomy of animation's development in the UK along three distinct "waves", the first comprising the establishment of the British animation industry, the second detailing the impact of the incursion of dissident politics, fringe artistic communities, and emergent distribution systems in the industry, and the third representing the neoliberal re-consolidation of all of these tendencies into more commercially driven and comedic popular media.

== Early experiments in form and commerce ==
Belgian scientist Joseph Plateau introduced stroboscopic animation in 1833 and in the same year published his designs with Ackermann in London as the Phantasmascope and later as the Fantascope, after the device had become known as the phénakistiscope through a publisher in Paris. Many British stroboscopic disc releases followed.

In 1872, English-born Eadweard Muybridge, a photographer living in San Francisco, started his series of sequential photographs of animals in motion. Books of his work are still widely used for reference by artists and animators.

"Matches Appeal", produced by Arthur Melbourne-Cooper of St. Albans for the Bryant May match company is thought to have been a 1899 stop motion commercial (according to Dutch researchers Tjitte de Vries and Ati Mul). In this film, stop-frame puppets made of matches were filmed frame by frame as they wrote on a blackboard. According to Elaine Burrows of the British Film Institute, the first animated film proper made in Britain was Cooper's Dolly’s Toys, produced in 1901, and featuring a mixture of live-action and stop-motion puppetry. In 1925, Cardiff-based animator Sid Griffiths working with Brian White, created the silent short Jerry the Tyke for Pathe, which was shown on their fortnightly magazine, Pathe Pictorial, on cinema screens around the world. Griffiths and Brian White set up together in Charing Cross Road, London in 1929, producing animated advertisements for the Superads agency. In 1927 the 40 minutes long and now lost cutout animated movie The Story of the Flag, by Anson Dyer, was released. Dyer's producer Archibald Nettlefold decided to split it into six parts and release them as a series of theatrical shorts instead, as he did not have enough faith in it as the main theatrical attraction.

== First wave: establishment of an industry ==
In the 1930s, the creation of public information films from the GPO (Post Office) unit and later wartime and post-war information films allowed for greater experimentation than the more market driven work across the Atlantic. John Grierson established GPO Film Unit and produced many films using animation as Grierson believed it was an ideal medium to communicate information. For these films he hired experimental animators such as Norman McLaren and Len Lye.

These GPO productions and the many wartime propaganda films led to an industry of animators with a diversity of design styles, well versed in conveying messages efficiently and clearly. The influence of the combined demand from smaller commercial and governmental contracts would encourage the development of a variety of boutique production companies, as opposed to the more monolithic system developing concurrently in the United States. Halas and Batchelor maintained their position as one of the leading European animation companies, producing many commercials and short films during most of the second half of the twentieth century, and in 1954 produced the influential and groundbreaking animated feature Animal Farm. It would set a darker tone for future animation production in UK.

=== Emergence of children's TV ===
The popularization of television broadcasting in the UK during the 1950s brought with it both new avenues for animation production and a shift in the demographic orientation of animation to the realms of children's programming. In 1950, the children's TV series Watch with Mother (1950–74) was broadcast, which featured several puppet-based segments (such as Andy Pandy and Flower Pot Men) that would go on to become staples of British children's popular imagery and animation.

BBC's investment in resources and personnel oriented to children's media during this time also provided avenues for the service's eventual inclusion of animation—particularly stop-motion animation, which could be derived from some of the same resources and skill-sets as live action puppetry. Puppeteer Gordon Murray for example, would branch off from his work on the Watch with Mother to create several stop motion animated children's series in the 1960s, including Camberwick Green (1966), Trumpton (1967) and Chigley (1969). Modelmaker Peter Firmin and writer Oliver Postgate similarly created several stop-motion animated works for children during this period, including Pingwings (1961–1964), Pogles' Wood (1966–1967) and Clangers (1969–1972). It is also during this period that ties between children's animation and British media grew. The shows of this period provided a blueprint for future children's TV focusing on rural communities and day-to-day interpersonal relationships. The transition from puppetry to stop-motion also demonstrates the influence of Eastern European animation such as that of Czech animator Jiří Trnka, with its proclivity for wood and felt puppets and static facial features.

=== Aesthetics and influence ===
The later impact of the music and film industries that brought the UK to the cultural fore during the 1960s and early 1970s created new markets and areas of influence for British pop culture. The 1968 animated feature film Yellow Submarine, which featured characters based on the Beatles and was produced by TVC Animation, was a worldwide success, and was highly influential in the course of animation and design in subsequent years for both its incorporation of psychedelic influences and the aesthetic continuity it established between these emergent aesthetics and the modernist graphic art. A few years later, Terry Gilliam developed his own distinctive style of anarchic cut out animation for Monty Python's Flying Circus (1969–1974) by employing similar motifs drawn from British culture, figures, and localities. This deviation from the Disney-codified squash and stretch approach would become a staple of Britain's boutique-driven animation culture, and would inform the more experimental films and TV segments that emerged in the following decades.

In the 1970s, this experimental tendency was fostered in large part by the British television system's commitment to and experimentation with educational programming formats. Vision On (1964–76) for example was a show created to cater to deaf children, featuring several animated segments, as well as fostering a growing pool of animation talent. Other programs in this vein included Take Hart, (1977-1983), a predominantly live-action educational show about art which featured some of Aardman's first work, with their character Morph, who would appear in a handful of other shows as well.

In the realm of theatrical animation, 1978 saw the release of Watership Down, adapted from a novel of the same name, which was commercially successful while at the same time featuring a much darker thematic approach to the cel-animated artform than its US contemporaries.

== Second wave (1979–1996) ==
The growing diversity of artistic approaches fostered during the 1970s came to fruition in the next decade, helped in some cases by funding from Channel 4. Alison de Vere was one of the first independent women animators to make an impact such as Mr Pascal (1979), which gained the Grand Prix at the Annecy Festival, and The Black Dog (1987). Other women also began to emerge during the 1970s, making films with overtly feminist and political themes.

Channel 4 was a fundamental supporter of fringe media on British broadcast TV, pushing for increased representations of underexposed issues of ethnicity and sexuality, as well as fostering political critique and artistic experimentation. This, coupled with a political climate that fostered a strong cultural response from more leftist groups, provided a fertile environment for work produced by many animators who had been working on the fringes, including that of Aardman, Joanna Quinn, Alison de Vere, David Anderson, the Brothers Quay, Paul Vester, Phil Mulloy and others. In addition to providing exposure and monetary support, this fostering of fringe animators allowed many of these animators to make contact with the wider artistic and entertainment community of the UK.

Though much of the animated work screened by Channel 4 during this time proved too experimental for mainstream tastes, some of it would yield global commercial successes. The television animated special The Snowman, an adaptation of Raymond Briggs novel, again produced by TVC Animation and directed by Dianne Jackson, was a substantial popular and financial success that remains a perennial Christmas favourite. It is during this time that Aardman would break through to the mainstream as well, thanks in large part to the shorts Creature Comforts (1989) and the Wallace and Gromit films, all of which were directed by Nick Park. Stop-motion would likewise continue to have a strong presence in children's TV, with Postman Pat. Mechanised puppetry mixed with limited stop-motion animation would similarly continue to be used in a few successful shows created during this time, such as Thomas the Tank Engine.

=== Cooperation and competition with American-based production companies ===
Walt Disney Productions established a British branch during this time that would be responsible for Who Framed Roger Rabbit in 1988. In 1991, Steven Spielberg's Amblimation would be established as well, producing several features as well as broadcast programming, including An American Tail: Fievel Goes West (1991), We're Back! A Dinosaur Story (1993), and Balto (1995). Though Amblimation would close in 1997, with some of its staff going on to join DreamWorks Animation.

In international interaction, several British animated shows produced during this time found success through syndication in the United States, including Cosgrove Hall's shows Danger Mouse (1981–1992) and Count Duckula (1988–1993), which, among others, were screened during the 1980s and early 1990s on the then-new children's cable network Nickelodeon.

The American media made its presence felt in Britain during the 1990s in other ways as well. With the explosive success of The Simpsons and the many adult-oriented animated sitcoms that followed in its wake Britain's TV companies saw the potential to generate substantial income from prime-time animated media franchises. Though Channel 4 would abandon its remit for fringe media in the wake of the emergence of both a less confrontational political climate during the 1990s and new narrowcasting platforms such as Sky TV (launched in 1993), the mantle of supporting animation would in turn be taken up by the wider commercial media.

== Third wave (1997–present) ==
The late 1990s brought with them substantial changes to the British cultural and media environment. Politically, the rise of New Labour would mean a softening of leftist dissidence in experimental animation. The new government's third way politics meant that it also embraced the market deregulation which forced broadcasters to re-prioritise commercial interests over public broadcasting agenda. The Broadcasting Act 1990 had already rendered Channel 4 a self-funding entity, thus making monetary profit a new priority for the broadcaster. New sources of competition emerged particularly in the realm of children's programming. Sky TV system brought entire channels of US and international TV content to the British media for the first time. With regard to children's TV, this would occur at first with the incursion of Nickelodeon in 1993, then Disney Channel in 1995, and Cartoon Network in 1999, with many new and derivative channels emerging since.

This rise in broadcasting competition and establishment of new priorities had several effects in the British animation production environment. To begin with, it offered further avenues for children's media producers to seek funding and distribution. This was beneficial to the existing animation boutique system production community which allowed for a variety of approaches and aesthetics. In the following years, there would be increased opportunities for transnational cooperation between producers based in the UK and the United States, Canada, France and others. This caused the general push to adapt fringe aesthetics and content to more mainstream tastes. In this respect, The Simpsons and later South Park would provide the primary blueprint, with a variety of shows produced in the following years that played with the line between adult humour and the stigma of childhood attached to animation, and further tie "adult-oriented" animated programming to the parameters of live-action sitcoms. It is leading up to and during this period that several shows aiming to marry avant garde aesthetics, subversive humour and prime-time appeal were produced, including Crapston Villas (1995–1997), Pond Life (1996–2000), Stressed Eric (1998–2000), Bob and Margaret (1998–2001), Rex the Runt (1998-2005), Monkey Dust (2003–2005), Modern Toss (2004–2008), I am Not an Animal (2004) and Popetown (2005).

=== Millennial children's animation ===
The BBC ceded a significant amount of the children's demographic to new channels. Instead doubled down on its flagship live-action children's programming and on preschool programming with the launch of CBeebies, a network fully devoted to early childhood programming, in 2002. Due to the financial success of Teletubbies in the late 1990s and early 2000s, focus was increased on the generation and recuperation of popular franchises. The 2000s thus witnessed the nostalgic recuperation of many once-successful animated shows from the last several decades. Notable original productions during the contemporary era adopt a similarly didactic tone as these shows, with maternal/paternal voiceover featuring prominently, as can be seen in Peppa Pig (2004–) and Sarah & Duck (2013–2017). The CGI animated show Octonauts (2010-2021) was designed to teach about sea life. Octonauts would later air on other channels such as Disney Junior and the Australian Broadcasting Corporation.

=== New and transnational media ===
During the 1990s and 2000s, the UK saw the emergence of a local video game industry, with derivative areas of production devoted to computer motion graphics generated in their wake. By the turn of the century, the UK had a strong local digital animation and computer graphics industry, with post production companies such as Framestore and Double Negative producing visual effects and computer graphics animation for a variety of local and international filmic works. Several British animations online developed international cult followings, such as Salad Fingers, EddsWorld and Don't Hug Me I'm Scared.

Similar transnational relationships would develop between established and emerging filmic and televisual animation studios and larger foreign companies. Aardman would sign co-financing and distribution deals with DreamWorks Animation for Chicken Run (2000), Wallace and Gromit: Curse of the Were-Rabbit (2005) and Flushed Away (2006), Columbia for Arthur Christmas (2011) and Pirates! In Adventures With Scientists (2012) and StudioCanal for Shaun the Sheep Movie (2015), Early Man (2018) and Farmageddon A Shaun the Sheep Movie (2019). They would likewise produce programing and interstitials for Nickelodeon much like the ones they once made for Channel 4 in the 1980s. Cartoon Network would also foster relationships with British producers, as their British and European division would be involved in many different co-productions with other animation studios around the world such as Fat Dog Mendoza, The Cramp Twins, Robotboy , Skatoony, Chop Socky Chooks and Hero 108 ,with their flagship series The Amazing World of Gumball (2011–2019), which was created, written, and partially animated in the UK, with British voice actors voicing many of the main characters.

Due to the early fragmentation of the industry which created a culture of interrelating but independent production companies, the UK has been able to continuously generate aesthetically innovative and often socially incisive animated works. British animation has managed for the most part to maintain both several markers of identity and niches within the global animation marketplace.

== Notable British animations ==
- 1899: Arthur Melbourne-Cooper's "Matches Appeal"
- 1925: Jerry the Tyke
- 1954: Animal Farm
- 1966: Trumptonshire Trilogy
- 1968: Yellow Submarine
- 1969: Clangers
- 1973: The Wombles
- 1974: Bagpuss
- 1976: Paddington
- 1978: Watership Down
- 1981: Danger Mouse
- 1981: Postman Pat
- 1982: Pink Floyd The Wall
- 1982: Plague Dogs
- 1982: SuperTed
- 1982: The Snowman
- 1984: The Wind in the Willows
- 1984: Thomas the Tank Engine & Friends, based on the Reverend W. Awdry's The Railway Series
- 1985: Dire Straits "Money for Nothing" (music video)
- 1986: Peter Gabriel "Sledgehammer" (music video)
- 1986: The Trap Door
- 1986: When the Wind Blows
- 1987: Fireman Sam
- 1988: Count Duckula
- 1989: Wallace and Gromit debut in A Grand Day Out
- 1989: A Tale of Two Toads
- 1989: Ric the Raven
- 1989: TUGS
- 1989 : Bangers and Mash
- 1989: The BFG
- 1990: The Dreamstone
- 1992: Noddy's Toyland Adventures
- 1993: The Animals of Farthing Wood
- 1993: The Thief and the Cobbler
- 1993: The Wrong Trousers
- 1995: A Close Shave
- 1997: Stage Fright
- 1999: Bob the Builder
- 1999: Watership Down
- 2000: Chicken Run
- 2000: Thomas and the Magic Railroad
- 2004: Peppa Pig
- 2004: Salad Fingers
- 2005: Wallace & Gromit: The Curse of the Were-Rabbit
- 2006: Flushed Away
- 2007: Shaun the Sheep
- 2008: Thomas & Friends switches from live-action models to CGI
- 2008: A Matter of Loaf and Death
- 2010: Octonauts
- 2011: The Amazing World of Gumball
- 2011: Don't Hug Me I'm Scared
- 2011: Arthur Christmas
- 2012: The Pirates! In an Adventure with Scientists!
- 2015: Shaun the Sheep Movie
- 2015: Danger Mouse returns for a brand new reboot series
- 2016: Ethel & Ernest
- 2018: Early Man
- 2018: Sherlock Gnomes
- 2018: Hilda
- 2019: Farmageddon: A Shaun the Sheep Movie
- 2021: Ron's Gone Wrong
- 2023: Chicken Run: Dawn of the Nugget
- 2024: Wallace & Gromit: Vengeance Most Fowl
- 2025: Doctor Who: Lux

== See also ==
- British Animation Awards
