= 1939–40 Baylor Bears basketball team =

American college basketball season

1939–40 Baylor Bears men's basketball
- Conference: Southwest Conference
- Record: 12–9 (7–5 SWC)
- Head coach: Ralph Wolf

1939–40 Southwest Conference men's basketball standings
	Conf.				Overall
Team	W		L	PCT	W		L	PCT
Rice	10	–	2	.833	25	–	4	.862
Texas	8	–	4	.667	18	–	5	.783
Baylor	7	–	5	.583	12	–	9	.571
Arkansas	6	–	6	.500	12	–	10	.545
Texas A&M	5	–	7	.417	11	–	11	.500
SMU	5	–	7	.417	7	–	13	.350
TCU	1	–	11	.083	7	–	16	.304

The 1939-40 Baylor Bears basketball team represented the Baylor University during the 1939-40 college men's basketball season.

== Schedule ==
Date time, TV	Opponent	Result	Record	Site city, state
*	Dr. Pepper AAU	L 36-41	0-1	Waco, TX
*	Southeastern Oklahoma State	W 41-34	1-1	Waco, TX
*	Southeastern Oklahoma State	W 47-32	2-1	Waco, TX
*	Dr. Pepper AAU	L 36-45	2-2	Waco, TX
*	Tulsa	W 46-32	3-2	Oklahoma City, OK
*	Central Missouri State	L 37-39	3-3	Oklahoma City, OK
*	Montana State	W 57-41	4-3	Oklahoma City, OK
*	Pittsburg State	L 43-48	4-4	Oklahoma City, OK
	SMU	L 44-47	4-5	Waco, TX
*	Mexico YMCA	W 60-42	5-5	Waco, TX
	at Texas A&M	L 30-40	5-6	College Station, TX
	Arkansas	W 40-26	6-6	Waco, TX
	Arkansas	W 47-39	7-6	Waco, TX
	Rice	W 45-43	8-6	Waco, TX
	at Rice	L 44-52	8-7	Houston, TX
	Texas A&M	W 68-36	9-7	Waco, TX
	at TCU	W 52-30	10-7	Fort Worth, TX
	at Texas	L 47-51	10-8	Austin, TX
	TCU	W 49-34	11-8	Waco, TX
	Texas	L 47-51	11-9	Waco, TX
	at SMU	W 48-30	12-9	Dallas, TX
*Non-conference game. (#) Tournament seedings in parentheses.
