= Steal Wool =

1957 Warner Bros. Looney Tunes cartoon directed by Chuck Jones

- Title card
- Directed by: Chuck Jones
- Story by: Michael Maltese
- Starring: Mel Blanc
- Edited by: Treg Brown
- Music by: Milt Franklyn
- Animation by: Richard Thompson; Ken Harris; Abe Levitow
- Layouts by: Maurice Noble
- Backgrounds by: Philip DeGuard
- Color process: Technicolor
- Production company: Warner Bros. Cartoons
- Distributed by: Warner Bros. Pictures; The Vitaphone Corporation
- Release date: June 8, 1957
- Running time: 7 minutes
- Language: English

Steal Wool is a 1957 Warner Bros. Looney Tunes cartoon directed by Chuck Jones. The short was released on June 8, 1957, and stars Ralph Wolf and Sam Sheepdog.

Mel Blanc provided for the voices of all the characters in this cartoon; however, like all Ralph Wolf and Sam Sheepdog shorts, this short is mostly composed of visual gags.

This is the fourth short featuring Ralph Wolf and Sam Sheepdog. The title is a play on steel wool.

== Plot ==
Like all Ralph Wolf and Sam Sheepdog shorts, this one revolves around Ralph Wolf trying to steal the sheep which Sam Sheepdog is guarding. Sam wakes up to his alarm and presses it harshly before it goes back to its original position. As he is leaving the house with his lunch box, he tosses a newspaper in front of Ralph's door and he comes out eating a doughnut. The two co-workers cordially bid each other good morning.

1. Ralph's first plan is to sneak under a sheep and carry it off, tiptoeing away while wearing it as a disguise. When Ralph is caught by Sam (possibly after the sheep bleated and despite Ralph's efforts to silence it), he attempts to push the sheep away and act innocent, but Sam punches him in the nose, turning his nose into an accordion.

2. As in all three earlier episodes, Ralph devises a plan that involves tunneling under the field and digging very small holes through the surface. This time, he creates the hole a safe distance away and surveys the area with a periscope. After spotting a sheep, he attempts to capture it with a lasso, but accidentally snags Sam, who punches him in the head. This time, Ralph walks away with his entire body turned into an accordion.

3. Ralph's third plan is to build a simple suspension bridge out of firecrackers and lure Sam to the other side. When Sam passes, Ralph grabs a sheep, lights the firecrackers, and runs across the bridge, ensuring that Sam has no way to return. However, Sam uses his uncanny ability to appear at the other end of the bridge, where he prompts Ralph to hand over the sheep. Ralph begins running toward the burning end of the bridge (which is now floating in midair, against the law of gravity, but not the laws of cartoon physics) and extinguishes the firecracker. However, Sam has lit the other end of the bridge, and Ralph's bridge disappears beneath him.

4. Ralph then attempts to place a makeshift teeter totter under Sam and jump on the other end from a great height. However, because of Sam's weight, the board merely acts as a springboard, tossing Ralph into Sam's arms. Sam places Ralph on one end of the teeter totter and slams the other end down as hard as he can, sending Ralph flying through the air.

5. Next, Ralph wheels a giant lit cannon up a hill behind Sam. As Ralph runs away, giddy, the cannon begins to roll down after him. As Ralph notices this, he runs as fast as he can, until he reaches the edge of a cliff, which has a very small cliff immediately below it. Ralph climbs onto the cliff and turtles. The cannon stops on the edge of the cliff, but has enough momentum to flip the cannon over so that it is pointing straight down at Ralph. Ralph, curious to see if he is safe, stands up, only to discover that he is inside the cannon just before it is about to fire.

6. In Ralph's final attempt, he sneaks up behind Sam and attaches each end of a very large elastic band to rocks on either side of Sam to create an over-sized slingshot. As Ralph pulls the band back, the rocks loosen and fire past him, anchoring themselves into opposing sides of a chasm, and slinging Ralph through the chasm. On the other side of the chasm, Ralph grabs hold of a tree and holds on for dear life, but the elasticity of the rubber band slings the two rocks into Ralph, sending Ralph, the two rocks, and a piece of the tree flying, while the rubber band is still wrapped around the rest of the tree. Ralph manages to free himself from the two rocks and the piece of tree, only to run into a cliff face and be crushed by the items. As Ralph crawls out from under the wreck, the rest of the tree slings into Ralph.

Finally, the time clock whistle blows and Ralph and Sam walk home. Ralph has two black eyes, an arm in a sling, and is stumbling around from the injuries that he sustained from the items that crushed him. Sam reassuringly suggests that Ralph has been working too hard, that he take the next day off and that Sam can handle both jobs. "Gee, th-thanks, Sam", Ralph says, staggering back into his house. "You're a....pal."

== Reception ==
Animation historian Greg Ford writes, "Much of the mythic resonance of Wile E. Coyote's all-consuming, Sisyphean scrambles after the Road Runner would seem to stem from the lunar emptiness of the desert and the absence of any more civilized environment. Yet when Chuck Jones deposited the coyote in a more 'human', workaday context and set his struggles against a verdant, ironically bucolic backdrop, his plight registers as even more absurdist. For Coyote (graced with a red nose and recast as Ralph Wolf) had an alternative life as half of an adversarial pairing with an affable sheepdog named Sam. Unluckily for the wolf, Sam's sight-obscuring mop top hides an ability to see everything, materialize everywhere, and ubiquitously mete out swift, draconian justice."

== Home media ==
This cartoon is featured on disc 4 of Looney Tunes Golden Collection: Volume 3 and disc 1 of Looney Tunes Platinum Collection: Volume 3.

== See also ==
- List of American films of 1957
- Ralph Wolf and Sam Sheepdog
- Looney Tunes and Merrie Melodies filmography (1950–1959)
