= Don't Give Up the Sheep =

- Title card
- Directed by: Charles M. Jones
- Story by: Michael Maltese
- Starring: Mel Blanc
- Music by: Carl Stalling
- Animation by: Ken Harris; Ben Washam; Lloyd Vaughan
- Layouts by: Robert Gribbroek
- Backgrounds by: Carlos Manriquez
- Color process: Technicolor
- Production company: Warner Bros. Cartoons
- Distributed by: Warner Bros. Pictures
- Release date: January 3, 1953
- Running time: 7 minutes
- Language: English

Don't Give Up the Sheep is a 1953 Warner Bros. Looney Tunes cartoon directed by Chuck Jones. The short was released on January 3, 1953, and stars Ralph Wolf and Sam Sheepdog.

Mel Blanc provided for the voices of all the characters in this cartoon. However, like all Ralph Wolf and Sam Sheepdog shorts, this short is mostly composed of visual gags.

This is the first short featuring Ralph Wolf and Sam Sheepdog and is the prototype for the following six shorts (here, Sam is referred to as Ralph, while Ralph Wolf is unnamed, although he is later given the name "George" in Sheep Ahoy, before both of their names became consistent as Sam and Ralph in Double or Mutton). The title is a play on the expression "Don't give up the ship". Like all Ralph Wolf and Sam Sheepdog shorts, this one revolves around Ralph Wolf trying to steal the sheep which Sam Sheepdog is guarding, though Ralph does not work with Sam in this one, unlike later shorts (not counting Sheep Ahoy).

== Plot ==
The short starts with Sam Sheepdog (named Ralph in this short) clocking in to work and begins his shift. Ralph Wolf (unnamed in this short) comes along, sees the sheep and devises a plan to steal the sheep without being noticed by Sam: first, Ralph tricks Sam into going home early by turning the time on the punch clock forward and setting the whistle off. Sam is initially tricked into thinking that the whistle indicated lunch and then quitting time, punches out, and heads home. However, he sees the clock of a church and hurries back to see Ralph carrying a large pile of sheep. Sam suddenly appears behind a tree and breaks a tree branch over Ralph's head, driving Ralph into the ground (although this all happens off-screen, and the viewer is left to figure out what happened after seeing the aftereffects).

Ralph disguises himself as a bush. After stealing a sheep and starting to run away, he runs past Sam, who himself is disguised as a tree and starts to follow Ralph. Sam hits Ralph on the head with a branch, leaving Ralph very confused and with a large lump on his head. After attempting to run further, this occurs once more, and Ralph is left with two lumps on his head. Ralph then gives up and carries the sheep back to the field as Sam impatiently taps his foot (disguised as a tree root).

Ralph reads a book of Greek myths which explains that Pan would "lull shepherds to sleep with the music of his pipes and then steal the sheep." Disguising himself as Pan, Ralph attempts to lull Sam to sleep with a pan flute, but Sam merely punches Ralph in the face and Ralph stumbles away and continues to play his song, out of tune.

Ralph tunnels under the field and pulls each sheep down through very small holes. This is mostly successful, until Ralph unwittingly pulls Sam underground and gets punched in the face. Ralph politely returns all the sheep and refills his tunnel.

Ralph places an Acme wild cat behind Sam. Ralph carefully opens the box with a rope from a distance behind another hill, but the wildcat simply runs in circles towards Ralph, maims him and scratches him.

Ralph swings on a rope over the field to snatch a sheep. Unfortunately, he unwittingly snatches Sam out of the flock. After realizing this, he leaves Sam at the bottom of the rope and climbs to the branch that the rope is tied to and saws the end of the branch off. After seemingly sending Sam crashing to the ground, Sam appears on further down the branch and saws it off at that point, sending Ralph falling. After Ralph seemingly hits the ground, he appears at the start of the branch. This gag continues until Sam is on the end of a cliff and Ralph uses a pick axe to detach the edge of the cliff and send Sam falling. The cartoon then disobeys gravity and leaves Sam's piece of earth floating in the air, as the rest of the cliff which Ralph is standing on falls down, leaving Sam confused.

Ralph snatches a sheep which is drinking from edge of a lake. He uses a hollow rush to swim through the lake unnoticed. Sam notices the rush sticking out of the water and drops a stick of dynamite into it. Damaged by a small underwater explosion, Ralph surfaces and then sinks like a ship.

Sam walks toward the punch clock as his replacement Fred Sheepdog punches in and greets him. Sam hits him over the head with a club, and the viewers see that Fred is really Ralph in a flawless disguise (complete with latex mask). As Sam begins spanking Ralph with the club, the real Fred Sheepdog shows up and takes over for him, continuing to spank Ralph.

== Home media ==
This cartoon is featured on disc 3 of Looney Tunes Golden Collection: Volume 1 (2003).

== See also ==
- Ralph Wolf and Sam Sheepdog
- Looney Tunes and Merrie Melodies filmography (1950–1959)
