= Sheep Ahoy =

- Title card (unrestored)
- Directed by: Charles M. Jones
- Story by: Michael Maltese
- Starring: Mel Blanc
- Music by: Milt Franklyn
- Animation by: Richard Thompson; Abe Levitow
- Layouts by: Maurice Noble
- Backgrounds by: Philip DeGuard
- Color process: Technicolor
- Production company: Warner Bros. Cartoons
- Distributed by: Warner Bros. Pictures; The Vitaphone Corporation
- Release date: December 11, 1954
- Running time: 6 minutes and 40 seconds
- Language: English

Sheep Ahoy is a 1954 Warner Bros. Merrie Melodies cartoon directed by Chuck Jones. The short was released on December 11, 1954, and stars Ralph Wolf and Sam Sheepdog.

Mel Blanc provided for the voices of all the characters in this cartoon, however, like all Sam Wolf and Ralph Sheepdog shorts, this short is mostly composed of visual gags.

This is the second short featuring Ralph Wolf and Sam Sheepdog. The title is a play on the phrase "Ship ahoy!"

== Plot ==
This story revolves around Ralph Wolf (here named George) trying to steal the sheep guarded by Sam Sheepdog (here called Fred), who has just exchanged shifts with co-worker Fred Sheepdog (here called Ralph). As Ralph runs off with a sheep, Sam pushes a rock over the ledge, which falls on the wolf's head. Ralph promptly lets the sheep go before falling over in a daze, a lump consequently growing on his head.

1. Ralph first attempts to drop a large boulder on Sam, but a tree branch catches the boulder and propels it upwards again as it crushes Ralph.

2. Ralph then tries to pole vault over Sam, but Sam grabs the pole, lowers it over the edge until Ralph is eye level with Sam, and punches him in the face.

3. Ralph surrounds himself with a cloud of smoke from an Acme smoke bomb to avoid detection. However, Sam, having headed him off at the pass, drops a stick of dynamite in his smoke cloud, blowing Ralph up. Ralph stumbles backwards uncoordinated and, unable to watch where he's going, falls off a log perched above a cliff.

4. Ralph uses an Acme disguise, an artificial rock, but Sam isn't fooled; he pulls out a sledgehammer, walks over to the "rock", and hits it with such force that Ralph breaks apart into a number of pebbles, which all move into Ralph's cave.

5. Ralph dives off a cliff while tied to a very large helium balloon and carrying a fishing rod to snag a sheep. He accidentally snags his balloon with his fish hook and rips it, sending him flying into the horizon before he finally comes crashing down.

6. Ralph tunnels under the field. As he reaches up through the holes, he feels what appears to be a sheep and pulls it into his tunnel. Unfortunately, it's actually four fake sheep legs strapped to a drum of TNT (presumably placed there by Sam), which goes off. After the explosion, Ralph places the drum back where it was sitting before politely refilling his hole.

7. Ralph swims through a stream with a pedal-powered submarine to catch a sheep which is taking a drink of water. As he swims towards his target, Sam holds a sign in front of his periscope which reads "DETOUR". Ralph follows it and realizes too late that he was tricked into going over a waterfall. Ralph vainly tries to pedal back as he falls off the waterfall. By the time he re-emerges from the water, pedaling off in a fit of delusion, the submarine is badly damaged and broken.

8. Finally, Ralph tries to propel Sam off his perch by placing a teeter totter under Sam and dropping a rock on it from a large height. Sam is propelled straight upward toward Ralph's cliff, where he grabs Ralph by the neck and begins punching him in the face. Eventually, the time clock whistle blows and Ralph and Sam change shifts with their respective replacements, a wolf resembling Wile E. Coyote named George Wolf (here named Sam), and Fred Sheepdog. Their replacements stand in the same position that Sam and Ralph were standing in before the whistle blew and Fred begins punching George in the face.

== Production notes ==
Like Don't Give Up the Sheep, the names of the characters are inconsistent in this short compared to the rest of the shorts. At the beginning of the short, Sam the sheepdog is coming on duty to replace another sheepdog named Fred. As the two pass, Fred calls Sam "Fred" and Sam calls Fred "Ralph". At the end of the short they reverse the names.

This is the second short of Ralph Wolf and Sam Sheepdog in which the two are not colleagues, but in this case working for respective and distinct agencies of Sheepdogs and Wolves.

This is also the only Ralph Wolf/Sam Sheepdog cartoon to feature Wile E. Coyote (the character Ralph has the same design too), he appears as Ralph's replacement named George Wolf, but is called "Sam" in this short.

== Home media ==
This short is available on the Looney Tunes Collectors Edition: Canine Corps VHS from Columbia House.

It was later made available on the Looney Tunes Collector's Choice Volume 3 Blu-Ray disc in 2024.

== See also ==
- Ralph Wolf and Sam Sheepdog
- Looney Tunes and Merrie Melodies filmography (1950–1959)
