= Woolen Under Where =

- Title card (unrestored)
- Directed by: Chuck Jones (planned, uncredited); Phil Monroe; Richard Thompson (both finished)
- Story by: Chuck Jones
- Starring: Mel Blanc
- Edited by: Treg Brown
- Music by: Bill Lava
- Animation by: Richard Thompson; Bob Bransford; Tom Ray; Ken Harris
- Layouts by: Maurice Noble (design); Alex Ignatiev
- Backgrounds by: Philip DeGuard
- Color process: Technicolor
- Production company: Warner Bros. Cartoons
- Distributed by: Warner Bros. Pictures
- Release date: May 11, 1963
- Running time: 6 minutes
- Country: United States
- Language: English

Woolen Under Where is a 1963 Warner Bros. Merrie Melodies cartoon co-directed by Phil Monroe and Richard Thompson. The short was released on May 11, 1963, and stars Ralph Wolf and Sam Sheepdog.

Mel Blanc provided for the voices in this cartoon, however, like all Ralph Wolf and Sam Sheepdog shorts, this short is mostly composed of visual gags.

It is the seventh and final short featuring Ralph Wolf and Sam Sheepdog. The title is a play on "woolen underwear". The short is notably the only instalment in the Ralph/Sam series to not be directed by Chuck Jones, who was fired early in production. However, Jones was still responsible for writing the story and is credited as such.

== Plot ==
Like all Ralph Wolf and Sam Sheepdog shorts, this one revolves around Ralph Wolf trying to steal the sheep which Sam Sheepdog is guarding. This short begins with Sam and Ralph enjoying breakfast (apparently as roommates) and walking to work. However, Sam appears far more bumbling while off duty in this short than in all the others, and he walks into trees on his way to work. Ralph punches Sam's card in, telling him as he runs into the tree where the punch clock is that he has done this. Before the whistle blows, Sam falls off the end of his cliff, just barely catching the cliff with his foot.

1. As the whistle blows, Ralph is prepared to sprint toward the sheep and even has a starting line drawn at his position. As he grabs a sheep and races back, Sam is climbing back onto his perch and unwittingly looses a rock on top of Ralph's head. Ralph races back to the position where he stole the sheep, puts it down, then races back to where the rock fell on his head, all while balancing the rock in position. Finally, he drops to the ground.

2. Ralph's next plan is to crawl under the grass of the field, lifting it like a carpet. After crawling under a sheep and trying to carry it away, Ralph is met with Sam, who has also crawled under the grass. Ralph attempts to run, but he is caught up in the grass, in much the same way as he was caught in the parachute in Ready, Woolen and Able. Sam punches Ralph and sends him sliding to the edge of the grass, where his head sticks out and the bump on his head lifts the grass up further.

3. Ralph now decides to try using plate armour to protect himself from Sam. He fearlessly walks up to Sam and gives him a raspberry. Sam pulls Ralph out through his helmet by his tongue, then shoves him back through the helmet, upside down and backwards. Ralph walks away, frustrated.

4. Ralph takes the idea of using armour further and fashions a tank out of a cannon, some metal shielding, and a unicycle. It takes Ralph some time to get into position with the unwieldy unicycle and he almost falls off the cliff. Once he does get into position, Sam simply closes the flap over Ralph's gun, causing Ralph to blow himself up. Ralph circles around uncoordinated and finally suffers from gravity.

5. Ralph now attempts to burrow under Sam and deposit a reservoir of dynamite. After firing off the dynamite, the earth directly beneath Sam remains, while the circle of earth around him flies into the air. Naturally, one of the boulders lands on Ralph.

6. Ralph then notices a sheep drinking by the edge of the pond. He dons a full suit of diving gear and jumps off his own diving board made out of a plank and a rock. However, he does not jump forward far enough and lands on the plank, which falls, sending the rock after it. Ralph and the plank land on another rock, creating a teeter totter, and when the falling rock lands on the other side Ralph is launched into the air and falls into Sam's arms. Ralph stands up and dives from there, falling head-first into the ground. Unfettered, Ralph swims through the earth with a front crawl.

7. In his final plan and gag for the final cartoon, Ralph finally decides to attempt every possible attack he can on Sam, all at once. All in back of Sam (with him seemingly unaware of this), he places a guillotine, two average-sized cannons, two large cannons, an extremely large rocket, various melee weapons and a series of gears underneath Sam that intend to pull the ground out from under him, dropping him into a tank of water with two alligators in it, but before he can fully pull the master control switch to set the process in motion, the punch clock whistle blows and he and Sam both have to go home. As the two punch out, Sam tells Ralph, "Well, better luck next time, Ralph", to which Ralph replies, "Oh sure, you can't win em' all, you know. Thanks." As they walk off into the sunset, Ralph ends the cartoon by saying, "Nice day, huh, Sam?" to which Sam replies, "Yep. Good to be alive, Ralph."

== Home media ==
This short is available on disc 1 of the Looney Tunes Collector's Vault: Volume 2 Blu-ray set.

== See also ==
- Ralph Wolf and Sam Sheepdog
- Merrie Melodies
- Looney Tunes and Merrie Melodies filmography (1960–1969)
