= Bonzo the Dog =

British cartoon character

Bonzo the Dog is a fictional cartoon character first created in 1922 by British comic strip artist George Studdy. The pup quickly rose to popularity in the 1920s. He starred in one of the world's first cartoons, inspired mass-marketed merchandise, and became a favourite among children and adults.

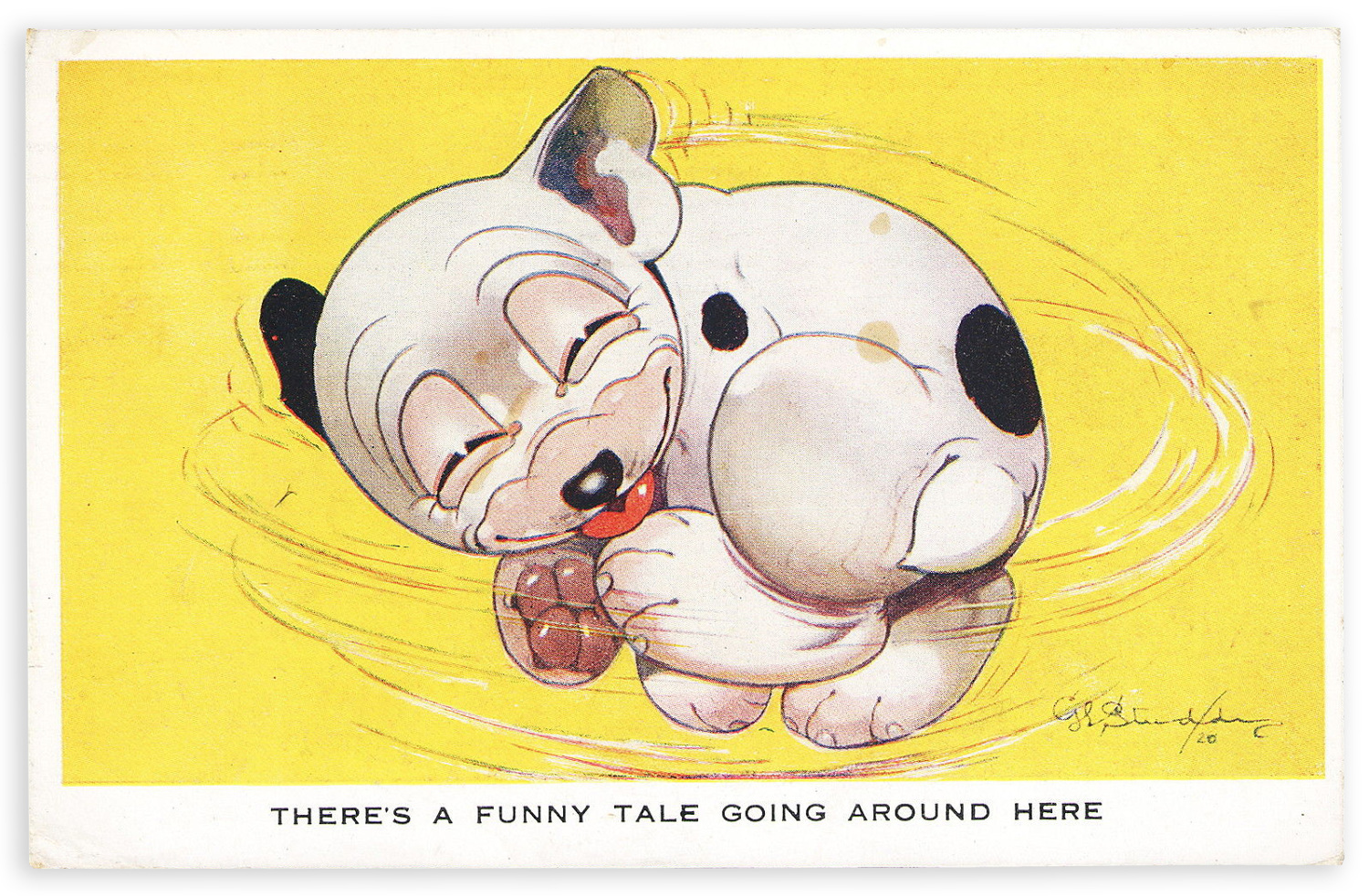
1928 Bonzo postcard

== Creation ==
In 1912 George Studdy signed a contract with The Sketch to produce a weekly full-page drawing. Bonzo originally first appeared in several of Studdy's sketches in 1922 in The Sketch magazine. When war broke out, he was commissioned by Gaumont to produce a series of short films called Studdy's War Studies. Studdy later introduced Bonzo into his sketches. Other "Studdy Dogs" had previously appeared in The Sketch, Pearson's Magazine, Bemrose Prints, Bystander, Holly Leaves, and Tatler. Bonzo also made appearances in The American Weekly, Fantasio, and Tit-Bits.

Bonzo is a chubby, white pup with a droopy face and saggy skin with big blue eyes and expressive ears. Other features include one black ear, one white, scattering of small black spots and a short, stubby tail.

Created around the same time as similar cartoons like Felix the Cat, Bonzo quickly became a popular icon not only in the United Kingdom, but was one of the first cartoon characters to be loved around the globe.

Some of Studdy's most famous Bonzo sketches include: "Bonzo discovers the Bonzosaurous egg", "Bonzo recognizes a lost brother", "Bonzo finds a trace of his ancestral courage in an old tapestry", "Bonzo finds his Father – and wonders where the cash went". There were all drafted in 1924 as part of the sketch series "Bonzo in search of his forefathers".

Bonzo's stage debut was in 1923 in Jack Buchanan's production of "Battling Butler" at London's Adelphi Theatre, followed by "From Dover Street to Dixie" at the London Pavilion. George Atterbury played the part of Bonzo in a velvet dog costume in both productions. He also appeared alongside Lupino Lane in pantomime.

Bonzo's film career launched in 1924 at the Marble Arch Pavilion with the premier of the first of 26 cartoons, Sausage Snatching Sensation. Brian White was one of the New Era Films Ltd. animation team and went on to work on Pathé's Jerry the Tyke film series in 1925.

Bonzo, wearing a set of headphones, became associated with the Crosley Pup, an affordable mass-produced AM radio introduced by Powel Crosley Jr. in the United States in 1925. Years later, both Bonzo commercial items and Crosley Pup radios became valuable as collectibles. A paper mâché Crosley Bonzo is on display at the Smithsonian Institution in Washington, D.C.

== Merchandise ==
Bonzo was the source of inspiration for a major merchandise campaign. In the 1920s several bookstores, department stores, and toy stores were selling Bonzo merchandise. Merchandise was mass-produced and manufactured not only in Bonzo's home country of England, but also in America, Austria, Belgium, Czechoslovakia, Denmark, France, Germany, Japan, and the Netherlands.

Some of the major merchandising campaigns include: Dean and Son's annuals and other books, Valentine & Sons postcards (approximately 500), the Artisco series of plaster figures, badges and pins, celluloid figures, Chad Valley and Steiff stuffed toys, Cowan & McKay toffee tins, Royal Grafton China, Royal Worcester and Royal Doulton figures, German and Japanese produced ceramics and most recently The Richard Dennis China Collection.

== Impact ==
A well-known dog breeder, Major J.E. Power, sought Studdy's help and advice in attempting to produce a new breed of terrier inspired by Bonzo to be named the Bonzo Terrier. His attempts were a failure.

The British rock group Bonzo Dog Doo-Dah Band and "Bonzo" brand dog food take their name from the eponymous terrier.

In the novel “Busman’s Honeymoon” by Dorothy L. Sayers a Bonzo vase is mentioned. The vase is described as “So amusing, isn’t it, holding the flowers in his mouth like that, and his little pink waistcoat?”

== Notes ==
- Fitzpatrick, Richard. "Who Is Bonzo." Bonzo and George Studdy. 1998. Web. 14 Nov. 2011. Web.
- Bryant, Mark. "Dr. Who? The First Cartoon Character." PeriodicaList A to Z :: Montana State University Libraries. Web. 14 Nov. 2011.
- “Gromit Saves the Day; Arts.” Times. [London, England] 9 Apr. 2005: 16. Academic OneFile. Web. 3 Nov. 2011.
