= Don't Give Up the Ship =

Don't Give Up the Ship may refer to:

- "Don't give up the ship", the dying command of U.S. naval officer James Lawrence later used as words on the battle flag of Oliver Hazard Perry during the Battle of Lake Erie
- Don't Give Up the Ship (film), a 1959 comedy
- Don't Give Up the Ship (game), a set of rules for naval war games

== See also ==
- Don't Give Up the Sheep, a 1953 Chuck Jones cartoon
