= The American Weekly =

Former Sunday newspaper supplement

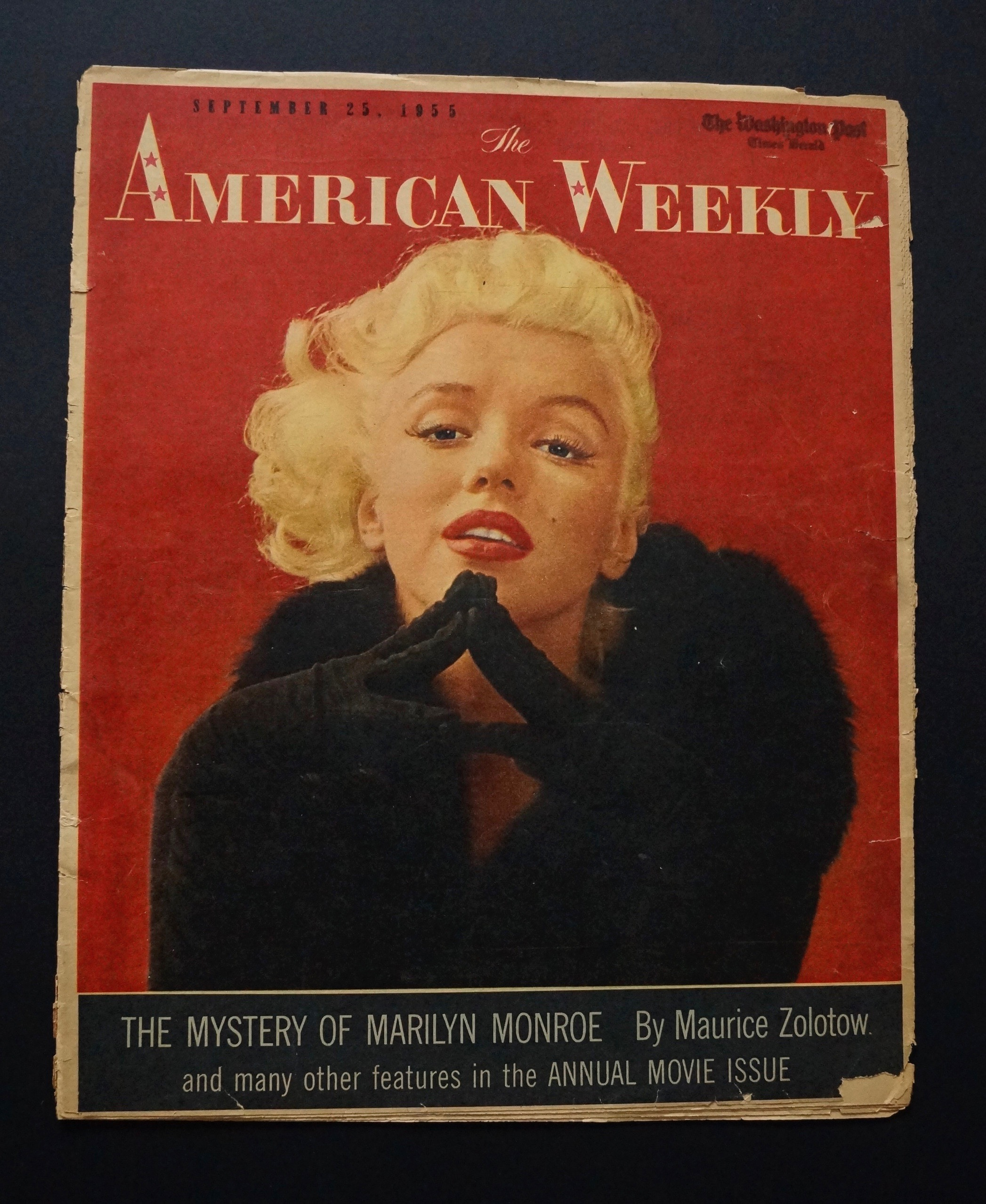
The American Weekly issue from September 25, 1955, with Marilyn Monroe on the cover. (from the Dave Riebeek Collection)

The American Weekly was a Sunday newspaper supplement published by the Hearst Corporation from November 1, 1896, until 1966.

== History ==
During the 1890s, publications were inserted into Joseph Pulitzer's New York World and William Randolph Hearst's New York Journal. Hearst had the eight-page Women's Home Journal and the 16-page Sunday American Magazine, which later became The American Weekly. In November 1896, Morrill Goddard, editor of the New York Journal from 1896 to 1937, launched Hearst's Sunday magazine, later commenting, "Nothing is so stale as yesterday's newspaper, but The American Weekly may be around the house for days or weeks and lose none of its interest."

Magazine and illustration historian Jim Vadeboncoeur Jr. outlined the contents and detailed the publication's leading illustrators:

It was billed as having a circulation of over 50,000,000 readers and was filled with scantily clad showgirls and tales of murder and suspense. It was large—about 21" x 15"—and printed on fragile newsprint, so few copies have survived the ensuing decades... While much of each 12-24-page issue was taken up with sensationalistic photos and text (and even some acknowledged fiction), the illustrations are generally top-notch... Cover artists include Howard Chandler Christy, James Montgomery Flagg, Nell Brinkley, A. K. Macdonald, C. D. Mitchell, Léon Bakst, Erté, Lee Conrey, Fish, Russell Patterson, Henry Raleigh, José Segrelles, G. E. Studdy and lots more. The best (and most) of the interior art is by the amazing Lee Conrey. Our collection runs from 1918 to 1943 and issues from 1923 through 1943 have his work. It's clear to me that he was a major influence on Virgil Finlay and probably on Alex Raymond. Thousands of his sensational pen and ink drawings appear in these issues... If you've seen the book Virgil Finlay in The American Weekly, you have an inkling of the type of work he's done for these issues between the years 1938 and 1943... Nothing was too farfetched to speculate upon if it could offer the possibility of a good picture. Finlay and Conrey both provided lots of imaginative drawings. Other regular contributors included Joe Little, Gordon Ross, Edmund Frederick, Ben Jorj Harris, et al, and I've turned up occasional work by John R. Flanagan, Orson Lowell, Otto Soglow... The ads were often spectacular. Not to imply that the following list is typical, but we have found a couple of large color ads each so far by Willy Pogany, N. C. Wyeth, McClelland Barclay, Matt Clark, Dean Cornwell, Bradshaw Crandell, John Lagatta, Andrew Loomis, Rose O'Neill, Norman Rockwell and others.

The name was changed to Pictorial Living in 1963 before it was finally cancelled in 1966. Due to the low quality of the paper on which it was printed, many issues have been lost despite the large circulation. As a result, it has become a collector's item.

== Papers that carried The American Weekly ==
Here is a partial list of newspapers that carried The American Weekly as a supplement, which often can be viewed archivally online and by microfilm.

- New York Journal-American
- Buffalo Courier Express
- Cincinnati Enquirer
- Times Union (Albany)
- Syracuse Herald-Journal

== See also ==
- National Enquirer
- Parade
- This Week
- USA Weekend
