= Gaspard and Lisa =

- Gaspard and Lisa characters
- Front of one of the books
- First appearance: Gaspard on Vacation
- Created by: Anne Gutman; Georg Hallensleben

In-universe information
- Species: Non specified, fictional
- Gender: Male (Gaspard); Female (Lisa)
- Occupation: Students
- Relatives: Charles (Gaspard's older brother); Mamie Matilde (Gaspard's grandmother); Victoria (Lisa's older sister); Lila (Lisa's baby sister); Unnamed parents
- Nationality: French

Gaspard et Lisa, more commonly known as Gaspard and Lisa, are two fictional characters appearing in a series of children's books created by wife and husband Anne Gutman and Georg Hallensleben.

The books center on two friends: Gaspard (black with a blue scarf) and Lisa (white with a red scarf) who go on various adventures. Gaspard, Lisa and their family members are drawn as animals, but live among humans in Paris, with the titular characters attending an ordinary school alongside human characters. According to the publisher, Gaspard and Lisa are Bull Terriers.

== Book series ==
Gutman and Hallensleben published the first "Gaspard et Lisa" book in French in 1999. The characters became hugely popular in Japan following the introduction of Japanese translations of the books in 2001.

Below is a list of the books in the series. The books have also been translated into fifteen languages.

Title	Publication date
Gaspard on Vacation	March 13, 2001
Lisa's Airplane Trip	March 13, 2001
Gaspard in Hospital	September 11, 2001
Gaspard and Lisa at the Museum	September 28, 2001
Gaspard at the Seashore	April 9, 2002
Lisa in New York	April 9, 2002
Gaspard and Lisa's Rainy Day	March 11, 2003
Lisa in the Jungle	September 9, 2003
Gaspard and Lisa: Friends Forever	September 9, 2003
Gaspard and Lisa's Ready-for-School Words	June 22, 2004
Lisa's Baby Sister	September 11, 2012
Gaspard and Lisa's Christmas Surprise	September 11, 2012

== Merchandising ==
Plushes of Gaspard and Lisa were produced by Sun Arrow. The toys were approved by the characters' creators.

Sony acquired the merchandising rights to the franchise in 2012.

== TV adaptation ==
Production company Chorion produced animated cartoons based on the books. The TV series debuted in 2010.
