= Ready, Woolen and Able =

- Title card (unrestored)
- Directed by: Chuck Jones
- Story by: Michael Maltese
- Starring: Mel Blanc
- Edited by: Treg Brown
- Music by: Milt Franklyn
- Animation by: Ken Harris; Richard Thompson; Ben Washam
- Layouts by: Maurice Noble
- Backgrounds by: Philip DeGuard
- Color process: Technicolor
- Production company: Warner Bros. Cartoons
- Distributed by: Warner Bros. Pictures; The Vitaphone Corporation
- Release date: July 30, 1960 (USA)
- Running time: 6 minutes
- Language: English

Ready, Woolen and Able is a 1960 Warner Bros. Merrie Melodies cartoon directed by Chuck Jones. The short was released on July 30, 1960, and stars Ralph Wolf and Sam Sheepdog.

Mel Blanc provided for the voices of all the characters in this cartoon; however, like all Ralph Wolf and Sam Sheepdog shorts, this short is mostly composed of visual gags.

That is the fifth short featuring Ralph Wolf and Sam Sheepdog. The title is a play on the phrase "ready, willing and able".

== Plot ==
Like all Ralph Wolf and Sam Sheepdog shorts, this one revolves around Ralph Wolf trying to steal the sheep which Sam Sheepdog is guarding. The short begins with a juxtaposition of how Sam and Ralph get to work. Sam takes a leisurely drive to work in what appears to be a caricature of a shoddy Ford Model T. Behind him, Ralph speeds past in a drag racer. After Ralph hastily parks and walks away, Sam pulls into his spot, careful to make the correct hand signals as he turns.

1. As soon as the whistle blows, Ralph sprints off to catch a sheep. Sam lumbers to his perch, grabbing a rake on his way and drops it in front of Ralph's path. Ralph steps on the rake causing the rake to smack him in the face. As the sheep jumps away, it lands on Ralph's back, bending him in half.

2. Next, Ralph attempts to use a lever to launch a stick of dynamite into Sam. However, as Ralph jumps on to one end of the lever, the stick of dynamite simply rolls toward him from the other end.

3. In Ralph's third attempt, he rolls an open barrel of gunpowder down a hill toward Sam, which leaves a trail of powder as it rolls. Ralph lights the trail after the barrel starts moving, but the barrel hits a rock and flies over Sam and under a boulder. The barrel subsequently explodes and sends the boulder flying and ultimately falling on Ralph, who, naturally, attempts to protect himself with a very small umbrella.

4. Next, Ralph purchases a box of "Two (2) Acme bed-springs", which he straps to his feet to increase his stride. After a few failed practice attempts, he gets the hang of it and heads off toward the field. As Ralph jumps over Sam, Sam pulls out a very large magnet which he uses to pull the springs off Ralph's feet in midair. Luckily, Ralph has a parachute. Unluckily, the wind blows him right next to Sam. As the parachute falls over Sam and Ralph like a shroud, Ralph attempts to run, but even though they are caught up in the fabric, Sam is able to grab Ralph and punch him. Ralph ultimately skids toward the edge of a cliff, where, after realization of his predicament, he falls.

5. Ralph's final attempt is very drawn out and plays on Sam's uncanny ability to be wherever he needs to be. Ralph first notices that Sam and one of the sheep are separated by a very large chasm, so Ralph attempts to cross the chasm with a trapeze. Upon crossing the chasm and grabbing what he thinks to be a sheep, it turns out that he has grabbed Sam. After realizing this mistake, he deposits Sam on the first cliff, only to swing back and discover that Sam is on the far cliff again. Ralph then decides to climb the trapeze, only to find that Sam is holding the trapeze. When Ralph then decides to slide down to the bottom of the trapeze, he finds Sam sitting there. Cutting all his losses, he decides to dive off the trapeze, and as he is falling he notices Sam sitting on three small cliff outcroppings, a branch, in a hot air balloon, fishing in a small dingy, and sleeping under water. Ralph then swims as fast as he can into the mouth of a sperm whale to find Sam standing against one of the whale's teeth. In shock, Ralph jumps out the whale's blowhole, to find Sam sitting in an inner tube atop the whale's spray of water. Ralph then runs, through the air, to the closest beach, where he finds the beach is full of at least 24 instances of Sam, and for the first time they are all visible at once. As Ralph blows his top, the time clock whistle blows and Sam begins driving home. As he is driving, an ambulance passes him and Ralph can be seen in the back bound in a straitjacket, being taken to a psychiatric hospital for his mental breakdown. The two politely wish each other good night.

== Home media ==
This cartoon is featured on the Road Runner & Wile E Coyote: Chariots of Fur VHS and on disc 1 of the Looney Tunes Collector's Vault: Volume 1 Blu-ray.

== See also ==
- List of American films of 1960
- Ralph Wolf and Sam Sheepdog
- Merrie Melodies
- Looney Tunes and Merrie Melodies filmography (1960–1969)
