= Fun in a Bakery Shop =

1902 film by Edwin S. Porter

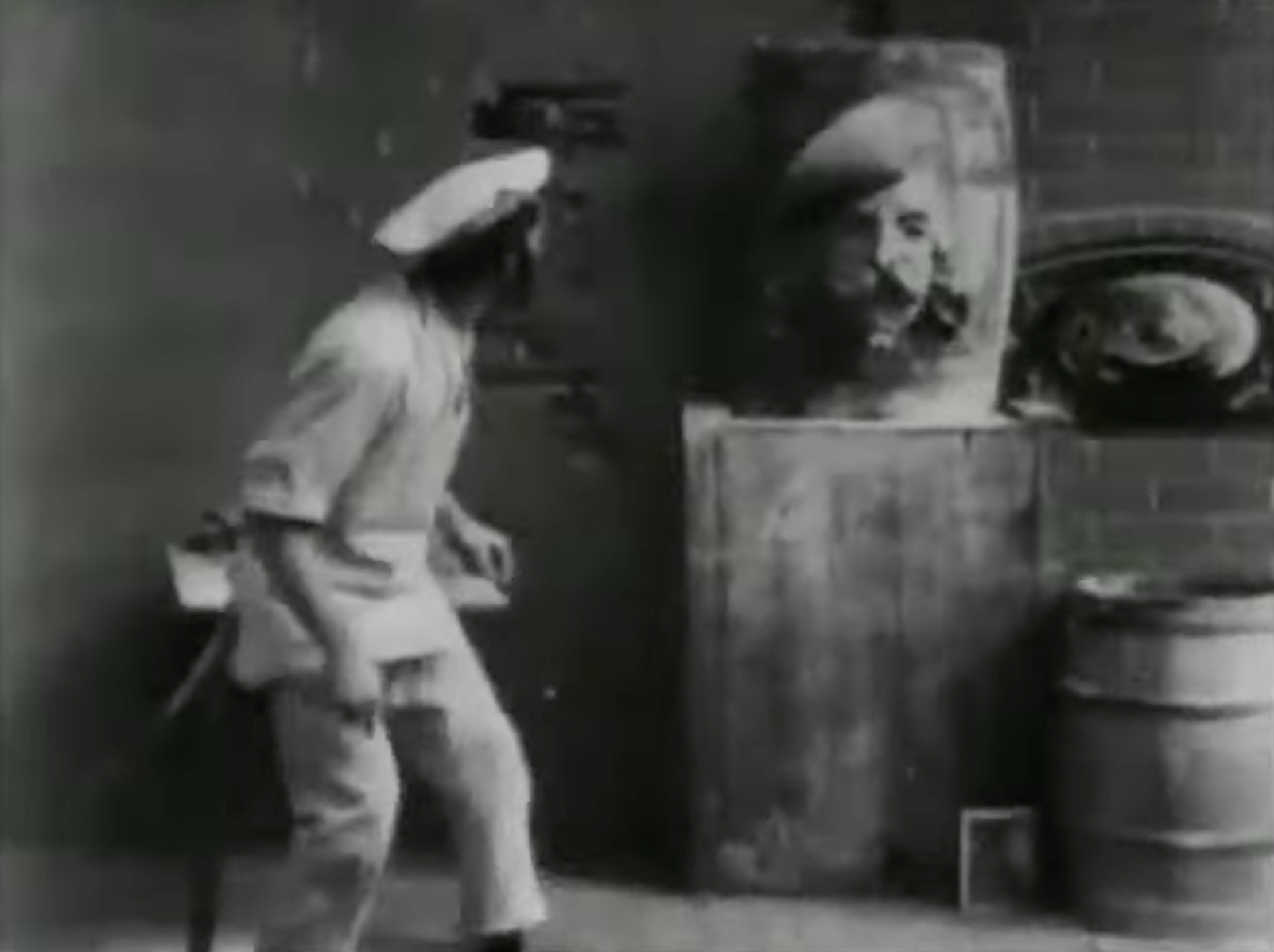
- Directed by: Edwin S. Porter
- Distributed by: Edison Manufacturing Company
- Release date: April 3, 1902
- Country: United States

Fun in a Bakery Shop is a 1902 American short film by Edwin S. Porter. Porter used stop-motion animation to depict clay loaves being sculpted into faces. The film was released on April 3, 1902, by the Edison Manufacturing Company. The film's plot was only the pretext of showcasing the skills of a fast sculptor.

== Plot ==
Fun in a Bakery Shop (1902)

The film is set in a bakery's interior. A man dressed as a baker kneads dough on a table, which is located next to an oven. He notices a rat crawling up a barrel, and throws dough at the rat. When the rat is completely covered in dough, the baker pummels that dough with his hands. The baker's back is turned towards the camera, obscuring the manipulation of the dough. When he finishes, the dough has turned into a sculptured mask. The baker proceeds to create another mask. Two other bakers then arrive, and notice what he is doing. They grab him, and stick his head into a barrel of flour. The film ends.

== Production ==
In 1897, plasticine was invented in the United Kingdom. The inventor William Harbutt published a book called Harbutt's Method and Use of Plasticine in the Arts of Writing, Drawing and Modelling in Educational Work, with the intention of providing methods for using plasticine in educational contexts. The book also provided the methods which were used in the animation of clay, claymation. The first use of clay in proto-animation emerged in trick films.

Several early trick films used the concept of the "lightning cartoonists", while Fun in a Bakery Shop introduced the concept of the "lightning sculptor". While not seen as an actual example of claymation, it paved the way for the use of clay animation in two 1908 film adaptations of the works of Winsor McCay (A Sculptor's Welsh Rabbit Dream and The Sculptor's Nightmare).

== Sources ==
- Dobson, Nichola (2010), "Chronology", The A to Z of Animation and Cartoons, Rowman & Littlefield, ISBN 978-0810876231
- Niver, Kemp R. (1985), "Fun in a Bakery Shop", Early Motion Pictures: The Paper Print Collection in the Library of Congress, Motion Picture, Broadcasting, and Recorded Sound Division, Library of Congress, ISBN 978-0844404639
- Wells, Paul (1998), "Continuities in Clay: Creature Comforts (1990)", Understanding Animation, Psychology Press, ISBN 978-0415115971
