= Double or Mutton =

- Title card (unrestored)
- Directed by: Charles M. Jones
- Story by: Michael Maltese
- Starring: Mel Blanc
- Music by: Milt Franklyn
- Animation by: Richard Thompson; Abe Levitow; Keith Darling; Ken Harris
- Layouts by: Philip DeGuard
- Backgrounds by: Philip DeGuard
- Color process: Technicolor
- Production company: Warner Bros. Cartoons
- Distributed by: Warner Bros. Pictures; The Vitaphone Corporation
- Release date: July 23, 1955 (U.S.)
- Running time: 7 minutes
- Language: English

Double or Mutton is a 1955 Warner Bros. Looney Tunes cartoon directed by Chuck Jones. The short was released on July 23, 1955, and is the third cartoon featuring Ralph Wolf and Sam Sheepdog.

Mel Blanc provided for the voices of all the characters in this cartoon; however, like all Ralph Wolf and Sam Sheepdog shorts, this short is mostly composed of visual gags.

The title is a play on the gambling wager double or nothing. This is also the first short where it is clearly established that Sam and Ralph are coworkers, as well as the first short where their names are consistent.

== Plot ==
Introduction: Like all Ralph Wolf and Sam Sheepdog shorts, this one revolves around Ralph Wolf trying to steal the sheep which Sam Sheepdog is guarding.

1. As in the previous two shorts, Ralph attempts to steal some sheep by burrowing under the field. After finding Sam waiting for Ralph above one of his holes, Ralph attempts to look innocuous, but Sam hits him over the head with a large wooden mallet (off-screen, but the effects can still be seen). As in the previous shorts, Ralph politely refills his tunnel.

2. Ralph next attempts to fashion himself a tightrope over the field by throwing a spear with a rope attached to a tree on the other side of the field. After walking across the tightrope and snagging a sheep with a lasso, he makes his way back to the cliff where the other end of the tightrope was fastened. Unfortunately, it turns out that Sam is holding that end of the tightrope. Ralph hands the sheep over and begins running the other direction before Sam releases his end of the tightrope. Just before Ralph begins to fall, he manages to grab on to the spear that was attached to the tree. However, as Ralph looks to the left, it turns out Sam is also holding that end of the tightrope. Sam launches the spear — and Ralph — over the horizon.

3. Ralph next attempts to shoot a rocket with a lasso attached at Sam. The contraption very successfully catches Sam and carries him off into the distance. Ralph, enamoured with his success, prances down to the field and casually takes his choice of sheep. As he prances away he is hit over the head with a club from Sam, still hanging from the fired rocket, which is now lodged in a tree.

4. Ralph's next plan is to disguise himself as Little Bo Peep. He prances up to Sam and shows him a book of nursery rhymes to bolster his disguise. He successfully herds a sheep past Sam and into his cave. However, the viewer soon discovers that the sheep is actually Sam in disguise. Ralph discovers this all too late, and the beating which ensues is left to the viewer's imagination.

5. Ralph's fifth plan is to fly over the field with an unwieldy helicopter while dangling a claw on a rope and attempting to grab a sheep with the claw, akin to the claw game. Sam casually walks by and yanks on the rope, causing the helicopter to plummet into the ground. After the crash, and much too late, Ralph deliriously attempts to abandon the helicopter and release his parachute, which simply falls on top of him like a shroud.

6. Ralph then attempts to hurl himself over Sam with a lever and a large stone. While successful, Ralph ends up hurling himself into a tree. Sam, sitting at the bottom of the tree, rolls Ralph up into a ball and tosses him over his shoulder, to the sound of bowling pins getting knocked over.

7. Ralph next attempts to roll a lit cannon behind Sam's back, but Sam simply flips the cannon around so it faces Ralph. As Ralph runs away, the cannonball lands exactly where Ralph ended up running to.

8. Finally, Ralph is sitting in his cave, depressed, and notices the rain outside, when an idea strikes him. He sneaks up behind Sam with a bottle of "Acme Patented Hair Grower (guaranteed)" and splashes some on Sam's head, who does not notice because of the rain. When the rain clears up, Sam has even more hair in front of his eyes than usual (he has this for the rest of the cartoon). Ralph tests to make sure that Sam cannot see him through the unruly mop of hair on his head and then heads down to grab a sheep. However, the moment Ralph lays a finger on the sheep, Sam hurtles down the hill to grab Ralph and pummel him. During the pummelling, the time clock whistles, signalling the end of their shifts. Sam and Ralph punch out, then cordially bid each other good night.

== Home media ==
The short was released on VHS in the 1980s on the home video release Looney Tunes Video Show Volume 3. Double or Mutton was released, restored and uncut, on the Looney Tunes Collector's Choice: Volume 4 Blu-Ray, in November 2024, and on the Looney Tunes Collector's Vault: Volume 1 Blu-Ray, in June 2025.

== See also ==
- Ralph Wolf and Sam Sheepdog
- Looney Tunes and Merrie Melodies filmography (1950–1959)
