= Fred Brunish =

The Young Fred Brunish.

Frederick William Brunish (1902–1952) was a painter best known for his work on the Woody Woodpecker cartoons. He married Hannah Kirschner and they had one son, Robert Brunish, born June 18, 1925. They moved from New York to Los Angeles, California in 1932. Fred began working at Walter Lantz Productions in 1942. He drew backgrounds for Walter Lantz cartoons from 1942 to 1943 and again from late 1945 until 1952.

Fred also produced oil paintings of pirates, ships, and landscapes.

During the last years of his life, Fred suffered increasingly from ulcerative colitis. Walter Lantz allowed him to work at home. His studio was located in a small building detached from the home he and Hannah shared.

He died on 25 June 1952.

Fred's grandson, Corey Brunish, is an actor, director, and Tony-winning Broadway producer.
