= Brian White (cartoonist) =

British cartoonist (1902–1984)

Brian "H.B." White (1902–1984) was a British cartoonist, creating 'The Nipper' for the Daily Mail between 1933 and 1947. Both "Keyhole Kate" and "Double Trouble" ran in London's Evening Standard.

Early in his career he forged links with Sid Griffiths, who had developed Jerry the Tyke and brought in White who had been one of the team of animators on the 1924 film of George E. Studdy's character Bonzo the dog. They latterly formed the company Griffiths and White in 1929, working from an office in the Charing Cross Road, London, initially producing animated advertisements for Superads where Carl Giles was first employed. Griffiths and White continued throughout the 1930s, eventually working at Anson Dyer's Anglia Films Stroud-based studio which was later taken over by Halas & Batchelor for the development of Animal Farm.

In collaboration with cousin Harold White, B&H Publications produced George Bernard Shaw Through The Camera in 1948.

Brian White worked for a year in 1952/3 on the first feature cartoon (75 minutes) Animal Farm, based on George Orwell's novel of the same name. An associate here was Sid Griffiths, with whom he had first collaborated 30 years earlier.

He is the grandfather of British sculptor Jon Edgar. White died at Rustington, West Sussex in 1984.

== Films ==
1925 Jerry the Troublesome Tyke (short) - animator

1925 The Joy Provider (short) - animator

1925 In and Out of Wembley (short) - animator

1926 A Flash Affair (short) - animator

1926 All Up a Tree (short) - animator

1926 A Sticky Business (short) - animator

1926 Going West (short) - animator

1926 Golf (short) - animator

1926 He Gets Fired (short) - animator

1926 We Nearly Lose Him (short) - animator

1925 Honesty Is the Best Policy (short) - animator

1930 Tropical Breezes - Director, with Sid Griffiths and A. Goodman

1933 Colonel Capers - animator

1934 Treasure Island - Director, writer and animator (the first part of the aborted Barnacle Bill Series)

== Cartoon characters ==
The Nipper 1933-1947 Daily Mail

Deed-a-day Danny Knockout (from Hugh McNeill) 1942

Little Tough Guy Knockout (Amalgamated/Fleetway comic)

Keyhole Kate Sparky (1965–74); London Evening Standard

Double Trouble London Evening Standard

Plum Duffy; The Topper comic

== Archival material with public access ==
Pathefilms web archive of Jerry the Tyke http://www.britishpathe.com/programmes/jerry-the-troublesome-tyke

British Cartoon Archive, Templeman Library, University of Kent, UK http://www.cartoons.ac.uk/artists/brianwhite/biography

Animal Farm (1955) film (DVD) EAN 5050582008982

Daily Mail Nipper Annual 1940 - reprinted White Crescent Press (1995) ISBN 0 900804 31 9
