= George E. Studdy =

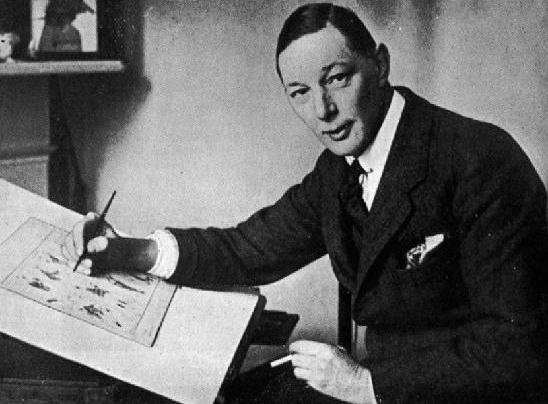
George E. Studdy

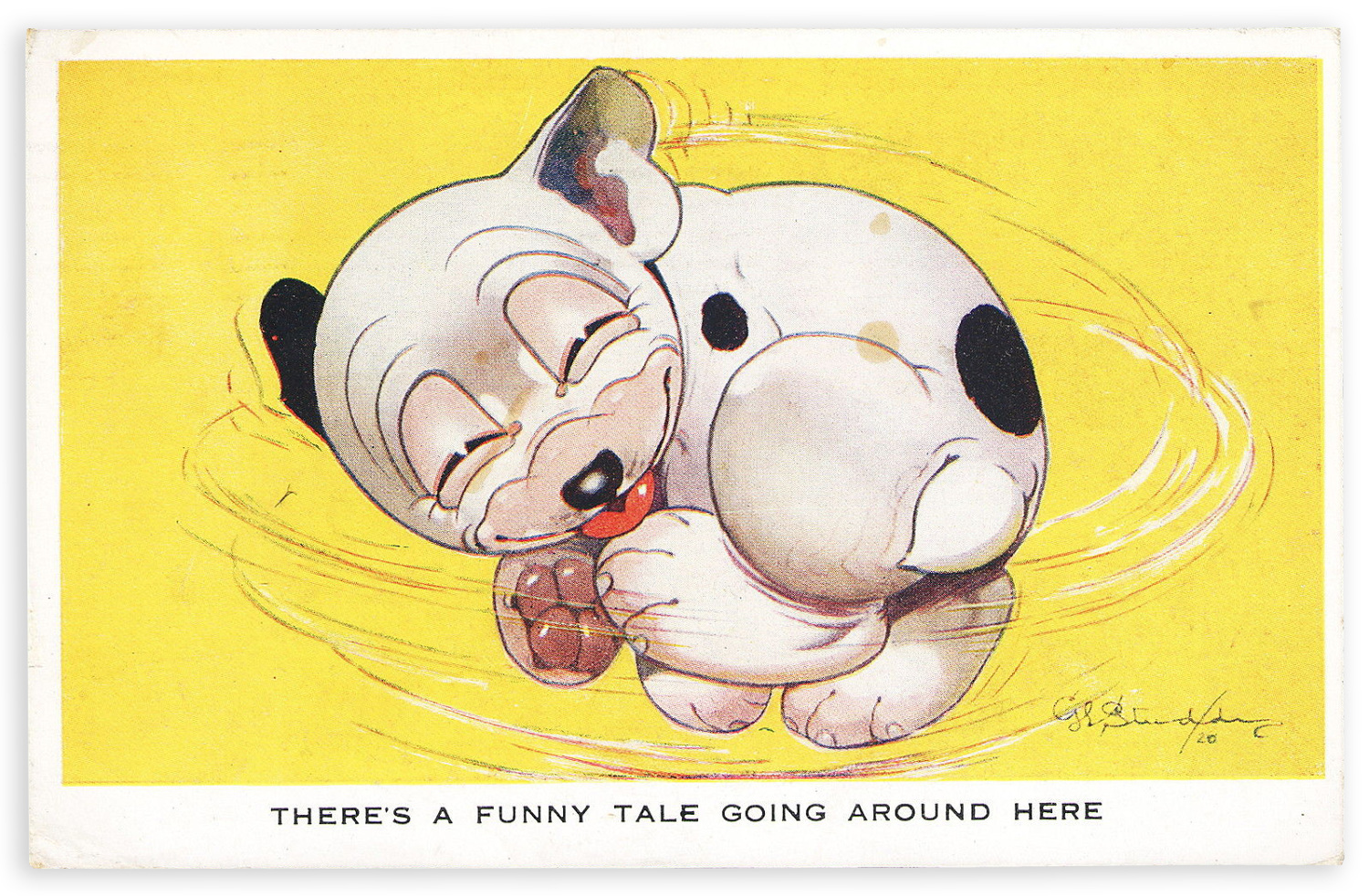
Bonzo, on a postcard

George Ernest Studdy (Devonport, 23 June 1878 – 25 July 1948) was a British commercial artist. He is best remembered for his creation of Bonzo the dog, a fictional character in the early 1920s that first appeared in The Sketch Magazine.

== Biography ==
Studdy was born on 23 June 1878, in Devonport, Devon, England. He was the second of three children of Ernest and Constance Studdy. His father was a lieutenant in the Argyll and Sutherland Highlanders. During his childhood, his foot was accidentally pierced by a pitchfork, which later prevented him from following his father into the army.

He pursued his education at Clifton College, Bristol, and then Dulwich College in London while living with his aunt. He left the College and England in the summer of 1896.

He worked as a stockbroker with the Thames Iron Works. He had always dreamed of going back to school, so with £100 given to him from his aunt, he attended night classes at the Heatherley School of Fine Art in London to study drawing as well as studying animal anatomy at Calderon's Animal School.

After art school, he shared a studio with several friends from art school while working to complete a portfolio. He was able to sell a few of his sketches to local newspapers and magazines. A few newspapers later commissioned Studdy to draw action scenes to go along with articles on the Boer War.

In 1900, as Studdy's sketches started to gain popularity, Comic Cuts, Boys Own Weekly and Pick-Me-Up began to publish Studdy's sketches regularly. It was about this time that he started his long relationship with Valentine & Sons postcards of Dundee. One of the first set they published was a series of six sketches called "The Evolution of the Motor Car".

In 1912, Studdy married Blanche Landrin. That same year he signed a contract with The Sketch to produce a weekly full-page drawing.

When war broke out, he was commissioned by Gaumont to produce a series of short films called Studdy’s War Studies. Studdy later introduced Bonzo into his sketches.

His Bonzo character was a chubby little white pup with sparse black spots, a stubby tail, and big blue eyes. Bonzo became the inspiration for much commercial merchandise, such as cuddly and mechanical toys, ashtrays, pincushions, trinket boxes, car mascots, jigsaw puzzles, books, calendars, candies, and a profusion of postcards.

In 1924 Gainsborough Pictures hired George Studdy to create 26 "Bonzo the Dog" animated Cartoons including 1) Bonzo, 2) Detective Bonzo and the Black Hand Gang, 3) Topical Bonzette, 4) Bonzo In The Army (aka: Tanks), 5) No.22 Bonzoby.

Bonzo's massive popularity allowed Studdy and his wife to live a very comfortable life until he died in 1948.
