= Ralph Wolf and Sam Sheepdog =

Warner Bros. theatrical cartoon characters

- Looney Tunes/Merrie Melodies characters
- Sam (left) and Ralph (right) punching in to work in A Sheep in the Deep
- First appearance: Don't Give Up the Sheep (January 3, 1953; 73 years ago)
- Created by: Chuck Jones
- Voiced by: Ralph Wolf: Mel Blanc (1953–1963); Bob Bergen (1998); Jeff Bergman (2001, 2020–present); Eric Bauza (2018); Sam Sheepdog: Mel Blanc (1953–1963); Jim Cummings (1994); Jeff Bergman (2001, 2023–present); Eric Bauza (2018); Fred Tatasciore (2020–present)

In-universe information
- Species: Ralph Wolf: Wolf; Sam Sheepdog: Briard
- Gender: Males (both)
- Nationality: American

Ralph Wolf and Sam Sheepdog are a duo of fictional animated characters in a series of animated cartoons in the Warner Bros. Looney Tunes and Merrie Melodies cartoons. The characters were created by Chuck Jones.

Ralph Wolf has virtually the same character design as another Chuck Jones character, Wile E. Coyote—brown fur, wiry body, and huge ears, but with a red nose in place of the Coyote's black one; (usually) white eyes instead of the Coyote's yellow ones; and, occasionally, a fang protruding from his mouth. He also shares the Coyote's appetite and persistent use of Acme Corporation products, but he covets sheep instead of roadrunners and, when he speaks (which is only in some cartoons, and even then usually only at the start and end of the cartoon), does not have the upper-class accent or the egotistical bearing of the Coyote. Another crucial difference is that of personality: Ralph does not have the fanatical drive of the Coyote in pursuing his prey; instead catching the sheep is only his weekday job as indicated by the time clock both he and Sam the Sheepdog punch at the start and end of the workday. Ralph has a co-worker named George who resembles Wile E. Coyote (with a black nose), but has a deeper voice; George's only appearance was in Sheep Ahoy.

Sam Sheepdog, by contrast, is a large, burly Berger de Brie (Briard) with white or tan fur and a mop of red hair that usually covers his eyes. He very rarely runs and tends to be sedentary in his movements. He does, however, possess sufficient strength to incapacitate Ralph with a single punch once he catches him. Sam has a co-worker named Fred that he occasionally changes shifts with (as shown in Don't Give Up the Sheep and Sheep Ahoy, Fred's only appearances). They are similar looking, but Fred has a lighter voice and black hair. Ralph has even attempted to dress as Fred to sneak in, but failed to fool Sam and was hit on the head; revealing Ralph's head under the costume.

== Original appearances ==
Inspired by the Friz Freleng cartoon The Sheepish Wolf of a decade earlier (October 17, 1942), Chuck Jones and Michael Maltese (who had written the earlier Freleng cartoon) created Ralph and Sam for a series of shorts. The first of these was Don't Give Up the Sheep, released on January 3, 1953 (although an onscreen copyright line gives the year 1951). In this first entry of the characters, only the sheepdogs are seen clocking in and out in this cartoon, except for "Ralph" attempting to clock out while disguised as "Sam's" replacement before being unmasked and pummeled. The next cartoon Sheep Ahoy (1954, with a 1953 copyright line) ended with a changing shift for both the sheepdog and wolf character clocking out with their replacement clocking in, the violence continuing wherever the predecessors had left off, setting in motion the fully realized version of the joke of both predator and protector just doing their jobs over the course of a day.

The cartoons proved a success, prompting Jones to repeat the formula four more times between 1955 and 1962. In 1963, ex-Jones animators Phil Monroe and Richard Thompson also starred the duo in their cartoon Woolen Under Where.

The series is built around the satiric idea that both Ralph and Sam are blue collar workers who are just doing their jobs. Most of the cartoons begin at the beginning of the workday, in which they both arrive with lunch pails at a sheep-grazing meadow, exchange pleasant chitchat, and punch into the same time clock. Work having officially begun with the morning whistle at 8:00 AM, Ralph repeatedly tries very hard to abduct the helpless sheep and invariably fails, either through his own ineptitude or the minimal but well-planned efforts of Sam (he is frequently seen sleeping), who always brutally punishes Ralph for the attempt. In many instances, there are also multiple copies of Ralph and particularly Sam.

At the end-of-the-day whistle at 5:00 PM (or sometimes 6:00 PM) Ralph and Sam punch out their time cards, again chat amiably, and leave, presumably only to come back the next day and do it all over again, or sometimes continue where they left off at the day previous. Or another sheepdog and wolf arrive for work to continue where the other two left off at, as they clock out and head home. They are even occasionally shown to be good friends outside of work. Both Ralph and Sam are performed by voice actor Mel Blanc. In A Sheep in the Deep, the workday is interrupted by a lunch break, which they also conduct amiably. The operation seems to run 24 hours a day or at least into another shift, as when Ralph and Sam "punch out" they may also run into their nighttime replacements, George and Fred, respectively. In some of their earlier appearances, Ralph and Sam are named inconsistently: in particular Sam's shift replacement sometimes addresses him as "Ralph".

== Shorts ==
- Don't Give Up the Sheep (1953)—Sam is referred to as Ralph; Ralph is unnamed.
- Sheep Ahoy (1954)—Sam is referred to as Fred; Ralph is referred to as George; their respective coworkers are named Ralph and Sam.
- Double or Mutton (1955)—The first short where Sam and Ralph are co-workers and their names are consistent.
- Steal Wool (1957)
- Ready, Woolen and Able (1960)
- A Sheep in the Deep (1962)
- Woolen Under Where (1963)

== Derivative appearances ==
Ralph and Sam have appeared in a handful of Warner Bros. projects since the closing of the studio's animation department in 1964. Sam made a cameo in the 1988 film Who Framed Roger Rabbit during the final scene (Ralph does not appear, however; likely to avoid confusion with Wile E. Coyote), and they occasionally feature in the Looney Tunes comic books published by DC Comics.

- Sheep, Dog 'n' Wolf (also known as Sheep Raider) for the original Sony PlayStation and PC, published by Infogrames, is a faithful adaptation of the series' sheep-abducting schemes. The Road Runner makes a cameo appearance in the training level and also in the final level, racing in the desert against Ralph. Neither Ralph nor Sam have voice lines in the game.
- Sam appeared in the Taz-Mania episode "Mutton for Nothing", voiced by Jim Cummings. In this episode, Taz was sent by the "Predators 'R' Us" temp agency to cover for Ralph Wolf while he is on vacation. Taz tries unsuccessfully to steal the sheep from Sam Sheepdog. A bit of character confusion is at play in this episode, as Sam references Ralph as being "that coyote".
- Sam made a cameo appearance in the 1996 film Space Jam. Though he is mostly seen in the background in the audience during the final basketball match between the Tune Squad and the Monstars, he is seen putting on rabbit ears while cheering for Bugs Bunny and is later visibly shocked when one of the players is squashed by a Monstar named Pound. He also makes a cameo appearance in the 2021 stand-alone sequel Space Jam: A New Legacy in Bugs Bunny's flashback leaving Tune World with the other Tunes.
- Ralph and Sam made a brief cameo in the 2003 feature film Looney Tunes: Back in Action. In the movie, during the scene at the restaurant, Ralph and Sam can be seen walking to a table in the background as Kate talks to Bugs Bunny about his cross-dressing tricks. Then, they are seen eating lunch at said table when Ralph reveals that he finally caught a sheep and is about to eat it, but Sam grabs him by the neck and continuously punches him in the face, allowing the sheep to escape.
- Sam makes an appearance in Bah, Humduck! A Looney Tunes Christmas.
- Sam appears in The Looney Tunes Show opening.
- Ralph and Sam appear in Looney Tunes Cartoons with Ralph voiced by Jeff Bergman and Sam voiced by Fred Tatasciore. The three shorts they appear in are titled "Fleece & Desist" (2020), "A Wolf in Cheap Clothing" (2021), and "Winter Hungerland" (2023). Sam made a cameo appearance in the Marc Antony and Pussyfoot short "Boarding Games" (2023).
- Sam made appearances in Bugs Bunny Builders. He has a major role in the episode “Sam’s Stylin’ Salon”, voiced by Fred Tatasciore.
- Sam made a non-speaking cameo appearance in the 2026 film Coyote vs. Acme, appearing as one of the many toons used as testing in Project Sisyphus.

== Pop culture references ==
Sam and Ralph hearing the lunch break whistle in A Sheep in the Deep.

On the episode "Donut Run" of the television program Veronica Mars, Veronica greets rival private detective Vinnie Van Lowe with "Mornin' Sam," and he replies, in kind, "Mornin' Ralph."

Chris Rock mentions Ralph and Sam in his book Rock This!. According to the text, a white classmate of Rock's who racially harassed him in high school not only resurfaced years later as his chauffeur, but also attempted to be amicable and suggested that they get together for coffee. Rock employs the "time clock" concept to racial tensions in schools by asserting that his tormentor was simply playing the role that he was dealt.

The NewsRadio episode "Twins" played with the reference in reverse. Bill McNeal and Jimmy James pass each other while stepping through Dave's window. Jimmy (the station owner) says, "Mornin' Sam," Bill (the office troublemaker) replies, "Mornin' Ralph," and Jimmy comments, "I love that joke."

A deleted scene for the Family Guy episode "Tales of a Third Grade Nothing" featured Peter Griffin as Sam Sheepdog at the time clock with Ralph Wolf.

A resemblance of Ralph Wolf and Big Bad Wolf appears in Strawberry Shortcake's Berry Bitty Adventures comics issued by IDW Publishing issue #7.

In the episode "Blood in the Water" of the USA Network legal drama Suits, Louis Litt compares his relationship with Harvey Specter to "Sam and Ralph" in a conversation with Mike Ross. He explains that for years, Harvey and he would butt heads during office hours, but at the end of the day they would still be on friendly terms. Litt finishes the analogy by saying that recently Specter had changed and that it now feels like Harvey's "always on the clock."

Journalist Mark Leibovich mentions Ralph and Sam in an October 2016 New York Times Magazine profile of Hillary Clinton's presidential campaign, as a metaphor for candidates during previous, more predictable presidential campaigns.

The names of Ralph and Sam have been applied to two sets of characters in the My Little Pony: Friendship is Magic comic book series, who engage in similar dialogue to Ralph and Sam. The first set are a pair of royal guards—a typical Pegasus and a bat-winged variant—while the second set are a pair of identical Storm Guards, minions of the primary antagonist of My Little Pony: The Movie.

During a scene in the Tomb Raider video game Shadow of the Tomb Raider (Porvenir Oil Fields), two members of the Trinity organization can be overheard greeting one another with an "Evening Ralph, Evening Sam" exchange.
