= Jerry the Tyke =

1925 British film by Sid Griffiths

Jerry the Troublesome Tyke
- Directed by: Sid Griffiths
- Written by: Sid Griffiths; Bert Bilby; Brian White
- Produced by: Sid Griffiths; Brian White
- Distributed by: Pathé
- Country: United Kingdom
- Language: Silent film

Jerry the Tyke, also known as Jerry the Troublesome Tyke, is a cartoon dog created during the silent film era. Created by Cardiff-based animator Sid Griffiths, and shown throughout British cinemas as part of Pathé Pictorial's screen news-magazines, Jerry the Tyke was the first animated series to be made in Wales.

== History ==
Jerry the Troublesome Tyke was first produced in 1925 by animator Sid Griffiths and photographer Bert Bilby who both worked as projectionists at Cardiff's Capitol Cinema. They were later joined by London-based co-animator Brian White. Inspired by the American animation Felix the Cat, Jerry the Tyke was a mixture of live-action sequences and animation, similar in style to Max Fleischer's Out of the Inkwell series. 40 animations were created between 1925 and 1927, and were shown throughout the World as part of Pathé Pictorial, a fortnightly cinema news-magazine. Each silent short lasted for about four minutes and often featured Griffiths interacting with Jerry, though Jerry always remained on the drawn page.

In 2002, Welsh actor Rhys Ifans worked with BBC Wales to provide narration to several of the original Jerry the Tyke episodes, with music provided by the BBC National Orchestra of Wales. The 'lost' episodes were discovered by the Welsh Animation Group in the vaults of British Pathé at Pinewood, and have been described as "...the most comprehensive surviving material of a British screen cartoon creature" The rediscovery of the films has resulted in Jerry the Tyke being reintroduced to modern audiences, being shown on channel BBC 2W in the United Kingdom since 2002 and featuring at the Pordenone Silent Film Festival in 2005 and the British Silent Film Festival in 2010. Today the films form part of the collection of the National Screen and Sound Archive of Wales.

Most recently Jerry the Tyke has been brought back to life by musician and composer Simon Lovatt. National Screen and Sound Archive of Wales and Arad Goch teamed up to provide young audiences a taste of Jerry the Tyke. Performed for the first time at the 2012 "Opening Doors" Performing Arts Festival for Young Audiences at the "Drum" in the National Library of Wales. The show was toured in 2013.

== Filmography ==
Title	Release date	Video
Jerry the Troublesome Tyke	1925	
Honesty Is the Best Policy	1925	
Jerry's Treasure Island Travel	1925	
Jerry Tracks The Treasure	1925	
There's Many a Slip	1925	
Jerry's Test Trial	1925	
A Very Jerry Expedition	1925	
The Joy Provider	1925	
Never Say Die	1925	
A Bird in the Hand	1925	
In and Out of Wembley	1925	
Jerry's Done it Again	1925	
Curing a Cold	1925	
The Deputy	1926	
"Weather" or Not	1926	
Ten Little Nigger Boys, now referred to as Ten Little Jerry Boys	1926	
All Cod!	1926	
One Exciting Nightmare	1926	
Both Biters Bit	1926	
When Jerry Papered the Parlour	1926	
A Wireless Whirl	1926	
We Nearly Lose Him	1926	
He Breaks Out	1926	
A Splash and a Dash	1926	
A Flash Affair	1926	
Football	1926	
Going West	1926	
A Sticky Business	1926	
All Up a Tree	1926	
Golf	1926	
He Gets "Fired"	1926	
Jerry is Too Canny for the Cannibals	1926	
Jerry Sacks a Saxophone	1926	
Shown Up!	1926	
Spoofing a Spook	1926	
Treasure Hunting	1926	
Weight and see	1926	
C.O.D.	1926	
His Birthday	1927	
Great Expectations	1927	
