= Visual gag =

Humor through visualization rather than sound or words

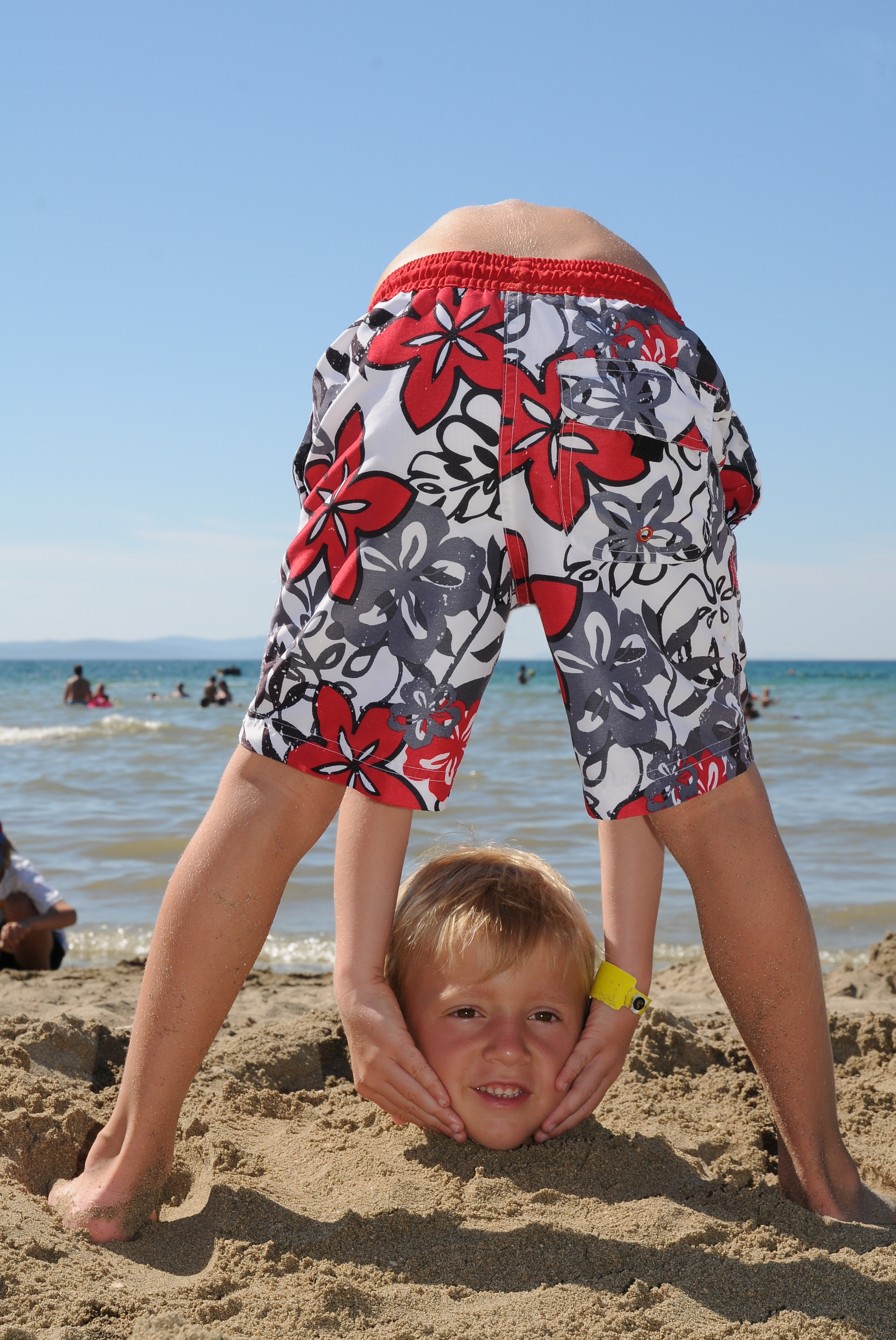
This image conveys a joke without the use of words.

In comedy, a visual gag or sight gag is anything which conveys its humour visually, often without words being used at all. The gag may involve a physical impossibility or an unexpected occurrence. The humor is caused by alternative interpretations of the goings-on. Visual gags are used in magic, plays and acting in film or television.

== Types ==
In a 1991 essay Notes on the Sight Gag, Noel Carroll establishes a taxonomy of sight gags, breaking down the varieties into six types:

The mutual interference or interpenetration of two (or more) series of events (or scenarios)
The audience is fully aware of the on-screen situation, but some or all of the characters misunderstand it. This type is used in the 1935 Alfred Hitchcock film The 39 Steps, in a scene where two characters attempt to check into an inn while disguising the fact that they are handcuffed together. The innkeeper assumes from their intense hand-holding that they are newlyweds, and the characters play along.
The mimed metaphor
A variety of virtual simile an object may be treated as if it is a different object or be used in an unconventional way, such as acting as if a doughnut is a barbell.
The switch image

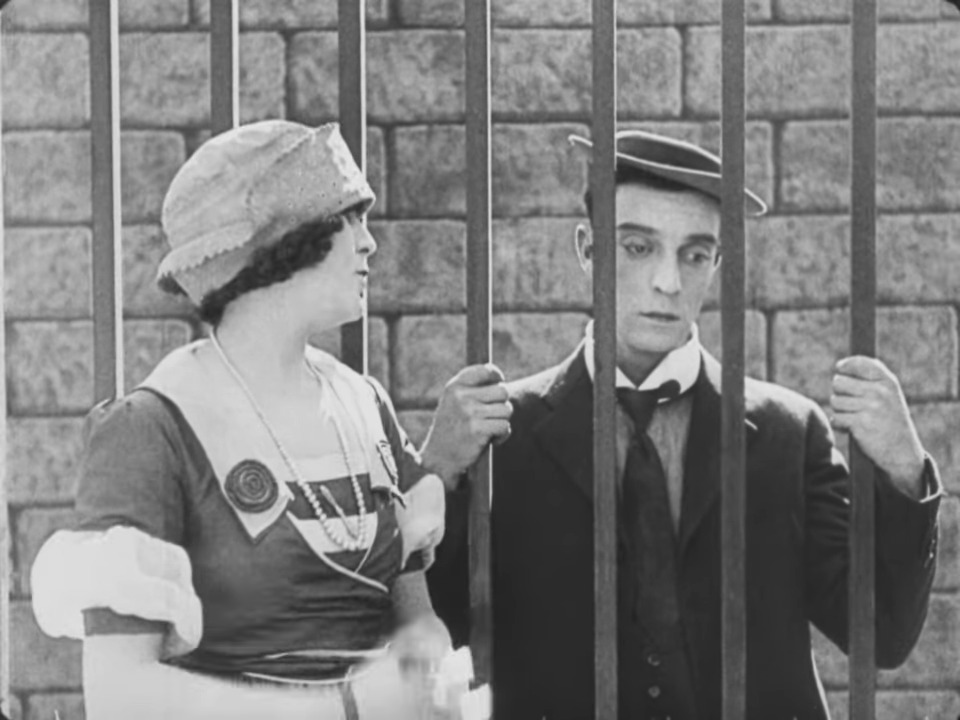
A "switch image" visual gag. Buster Keaton's character initially appears to be in prison, but is revealed in the next shot to just be standing behind a gate.

A subsequent view of the scene shows something not viewed before, such as a scene in Cops where Buster Keaton's character appears to be in prison, but is revealed to simply be behind the bars of a gate. Such gags are often used at the beginning of a film.
The switch movement
A character changes their behavior to suggest they were doing something else. In The Pawnshop, Charlie Chaplin fights with his coworker and aims a punch at him. When their boss walks in mid-swing, Chaplin changes the motion to act as if he was dropping to his knees to scrub the floor. Carroll compares these gags to puns.
The object analog
An object is used as if it were something else, such as Chaplin using a tuba as an umbrella holder in The Pawnshop. Unlike the mimed metaphor, no exaggerated action is required from the actor.
The solution gag
A rarer type of gag where a character is able to deploy a surprising physical strategy to solve a problem that they are facing, such as Keaton throwing one railway sleeper at another to clear the path in The General.

== History ==
L'Arroseur Arrosé , 1895

There are numerous examples in cinema history of directors who based most of the humor in their films on visual gags, even to the point of using no or minimal dialogue. Visual gags began in live theater. The first known use of a visual gag in a film was in the Lumière brothers' 1895 short, L'Arroseur Arrosé ("The Waterer Watered"), in which a gardener watering his plants becomes the subject of a boy's prank. An early pioneer in visual gags was Georges Méliès. The filmmaker experimented with techniques in the then-new film media creating techniques to trick viewers.

Vaudeville actors often used gags in their routines. A classic vaudeville visual gag was for two actors to mirror each other's actions around a prop. Visual gags were continued into silent films and are considered a hallmark of the genre. In silent films, the actors in the mirror bit performed in silence with no music playing. Comedians including Charlie Chaplin, Buster Keaton, Harold Lloyd and the Marx Brothers often used visual humour because the technology used to record voices in film (and play it back in a synchronized presentation) did not yet exist. Often the differences between people are part of the comic duos, especially thin and fat actors are used such as Abbott and Costello and Laurel and Hardy.

The New York Times cites the fourth Gilligan's Island episode, "Goodnight, Sweet Skipper", as a classic American sight gag. The castaways were trying to contact civilization with a radio. In the episode, Skipper can recall only how he converted the radio into a transmitter in World War II when he was sleepwalking. After Skipper was unsuccessful, Gilligan got it to work by pounding on the radio; he used it to briefly contact a pilot flying overhead. Gilligan retrieved Skipper and demonstrated how he pounded on the radio, causing the guts of the radio to fall out. Their rescue was foiled.

== See also ==
- Joke
