= Watership Down (disambiguation) =

Watership Down is a 1972 adventure novel by Richard Adams.

Watership Down may also refer to:

== Places ==
- Watership Down, Hampshire, the hill in England around which the novel is set

== Art, entertainment, and media ==
=== Literature ===
- Tales from Watership Down (1996), a collection of 19 short stories by Richard Adams, written as a follow-up to his 1972 novel

=== Film and television ===
- Watership Down (film), a 1978 animated film based on Adams's novel
- Watership Down (1999 TV series), a 1999-2001 animated television series based on Adams's novel
- Watership Down (2018 TV series), a 2018 animated programme co-produced by Netflix and the BBC based on Adams's novel

=== Music ===
- Atomship, an alternative metal band from Mississippi formerly named Watership Down
- "Watership Down", song on America's 1976 album Hideaway
