= George Jackson (animator) =

British animator

- Born: 26 October 1921; Fleetwood, Lancashire, UK
- Died: 16 March 1986 (aged 64); Culcheth, Cheshire, UK

George Jackson (26 October 1921 – 16 March 1986) was a British animator, who has worked on children's films and television programmes and is best known for his work on the 1989 animated film The BFG, and work with Martin Rosen on Watership Down and The Plague Dogs. He lived in Maidenhead in 1978.

== Filmography ==
Year	Film	Role	Other notes
1949	It's a Lovely Day	Animator	Short
1949	The Australian Platypus	Animator	Short
1975	Dick Deadeye, or Duty Done	Animator	
1978	Watership Down	Animator	
1978	The Talking Parcel	Animator	
1979	The Lion, the Witch & the Wardrobe	Animator	
1982	The Plague Dogs	Animator	
1989	The BFG	Animator	The film was dedicated in memory of him

== Television series ==
Year	Title	Role
1981–1987	Danger Mouse	Animator
1985-1986	Alias the Jester	Animator
