= The Plague Dogs (film) =

1982 British-American film

- Theatrical release poster
- Directed by: Martin Rosen
- Written by: Martin Rosen
- Based on: The Plague Dogs by Richard Adams
- Produced by: Martin Rosen
- Starring: John Hurt; Christopher Benjamin; James Bolam
- Edited by: Richard Harkness
- Music by: Patrick Gleeson
- Production companies: United Artists; Goldcrest Films; Nepenthe Productions
- Distributed by: MGM/UA Entertainment Co. (United Kingdom; through United International Pictures); Embassy Pictures (United States)
- Release dates: 21 October 1982 (United Kingdom); 16 December 1983 (United States)
- Running time: 103 minutes (United Kingdom); 86 minutes (United States)
- Countries: United Kingdom; United States
- Language: English
- Budget: $6 million
- Box office: £308,000 (US$423,281)

The Plague Dogs is a 1982 adult animated adventure drama film written, produced and directed by Martin Rosen based on the 1977 novel by Richard Adams. The film's story is centred on two dogs named Rowf and Snitter, who escape from a research laboratory in Great Britain. In the process of telling the story, the film highlights the cruelty of performing vivisection and animal research for its own sake (though Rosen said that this was not an anti-vivisection film, but an adventure).

Rosen previously adapted Watership Down, also based on another novel by Adams. The Plague Dogs was produced by Nepenthe Productions; it was released by Embassy Pictures in the United States and by United Artists in the United Kingdom. The film was originally released unrated in the United States, but for its DVD release, was re-rated PG-13 by the MPAA for mature themes such as animal cruelty, violent imagery, and emotionally distressing scenes. The Plague Dogs is the first non-family-oriented MGM animated film, and the first adult animated feature by United Artists and MGM.

== Plot ==
Rowf, a labrador-mix, and Snitter, a smooth fox-terrier, are two of many dogs used for experimental purposes at an animal research facility in the Lake District of north-western England. Snitter has had his brain surgically experimented upon (leaving the top of his head scarred and covered with bandages), while Rowf has been drowned and resuscitated repeatedly. One evening, Snitter squeezes under the netting of his cage and into Rowf's, where they discover his cage is unlatched. They explore the facility in order to escape until they sneak into the incinerator, where they narrowly escape in time before it ignites.

Initially relieved and eager to experience their new freedom, the dogs are soon faced not only with the realities of life in the wild but with the fact that they are being hunted by their former captors. They come to befriend the Tod, a nameless Geordie-accented fox who goes by the local slang term for a wild fox. The Tod teaches them to hunt in the wild in exchange for a share of their kills. Snitter hopes for a new home as he once had a master, but loses hope after accidentally killing a man by stepping onto the trigger of his shotgun as he climbs up onto him.

As time passes, the two dogs grow emaciated, having to steal more and more food while still avoiding capture. The Tod is also proven to be difficult for the dogs to understand and cooperate. When the Tod finds a nest of eggs, he eats them all himself, enraging Rowf. The Tod himself disapproves of their risky behaviour, like killing domestic sheep grazing on the local hills. They go their separate ways for a time, but the Tod eventually returns to assist them by distracting a lab-hired gunman who then falls to his death, allowing the starving dogs to consume his corpse. The three reconcile and wander about aimlessly, with the 3rd Battalion, Parachute Regiment and the media roped into the pursuit, driven by rumours of the two dogs carrying bubonic plague.

The Tod parts company with the two dogs after leading them to a train pulled by River Irt on the Ravenglass and Eskdale Railway. While the dogs escape on the train, the Tod sacrifices his life by distracting the military in order to allow Snitter and Rowf to escape. Thanks to the Tod's distraction, Snitter and Rowf arrive at the coastal village of Ravenglass, but upon departing the train, the two dogs are spotted by an RAF Sea King helicopter and are pursued by it until they reach the shoreline and can run no farther. Meanwhile, the research facility receives a call from a senior civil servant, who demands the complete cessation of all experiments.

As armed troops approach and prepare to shoot the dogs, Snitter looks out over the water and claims to see an island—he jumps into the sea and begins to swim to it. Rowf is hesitant to follow due to his conditioned fear of water, but his greater fear of the gunmen drives him to jump in as well and catch up with Snitter. Two gunshots are fired at the dogs but seemingly miss; immediately, a white mist envelops the pair, and the troops disappear. The dogs swim through the mist towards the island Snitter claims to see, but Rowf cannot spot. Snitter eventually begins to doubt that there is any island and he stops paddling, losing hope. Rowf, however, claims to finally spot the island and urges Snitter to continue. During the credits, the mist lifts, revealing an island on the horizon while the clouds slowly part and the sky ultimately clears.

== Cast ==
- John Hurt as Snitter
- Christopher Benjamin as Rowf
- James Bolam as The Tod
- Nigel Hawthorne as Dr. Boycott
- Warren Mitchell as Harry Tyson / Wag
- Bernard Hepton as Stephen Powell
- Brian Stirner as Laboratory Assistant
- Penelope Lee as Lynn Driver
- Geoffrey Matthews as Farmer
- Barbara Leigh-Hunt as Farmer's Wife
- John Bennett as Don
- John Franklyn-Robbins as Dennis Williamson
- Bill Maynard as Editor
- Malcolm Terris as Robert Lindsay
- Judy Geeson as Pekingese
- Philip Locke as Civil Servant #1
- Brian Spink as Civil Servant #2
- Tony Church as Civil Servant #3
- Anthony Valentine as Civil Servant #4
- William Lucas as Civil Servant #5
- Dandy Nichols as Phyllis Dawson
- Rosemary Leach as Vera Dawson
- Patrick Stewart as John Awdry
- Percy Edwards as Animal Vocalization

== Production ==
The film was animated in both Britain and San Francisco, California between 1979 and 1982. British animators such as Arthur Humberstone, Alan Simpson, George Jackson, and Colin White came from the unit that had previously worked on Watership Down. The San Francisco crew included Brad Bird, whom Rosen confessed he regretted firing decades after the fact due to his admiration for his directorial efforts, Phil Robinson, and Retta Scott, a "Disney veteran who had animated the vicious hunting dogs in Bambi."

Goldcrest Films invested £900,000 in the film and earned £308,000, losing the company £595,000. Jake Eberts who helped finance this and Watership Down thought the filmmakers made two errors: the film was downbeat with an unhappy ending, unlike the book, and was made without a distributor (an arrangement was made with Embassy but then the filmmakers wanted to re-negotiate and Embassy pulled out while United Artists became the film's UK distributor).

=== End theme ===
The theme song, "Time and Tide", was composed and sung by Alan Price.

The song, as well as dialogue from the film, was sampled by the Canadian industrial group Skinny Puppy for their anti-vivisection single "Testure", from their 1988 album VIVIsectVI.

== Reception ==
The film had a test screening in Seattle on 17 December 1983. Rosen had difficulty in finding distributors for the film, and it entered a limited release in the U.S. on 9 January 1985. On Rotten Tomatoes the film has an approval rating of 70% based on reviews from 10 critics, with an average rating of 7.30/10. Janet Maslin, in her 1985 New York Times review of the U.S. release, praised the visual style: "Martin Rosen treats his Plague Dogs almost as though it were live action. He varies the scenery and the camera angles imaginatively [...] Mr. Rosen's direction is quite ingenious, much more so than Mr. Adams's story."

== Home media ==
Two versions exist: the original UK theatrical release (103 minutes) and the edited US version (86 minutes). Most edits were made to reduce running time but one was for its shocking content: After the hired gunman Ackland falls to his death from a steep crag from which he attempts to shoot the dogs, a military helicopter flies over the snow-covered crags and valleys and the soldiers in the helicopter find the body ripped to shreds, implying that the starving dogs had eaten the corpse.

The full theatrical cut was first released on a UK rental-only, PG-certificate VHS by Thorn EMI in December 1983; only around 8,000 copies were issued. On 22 August 1988, it was commercially released on VHS in the UK by Warner Home Video. In 1986, the edit was released on US VHS by Charter Entertainment.

In 2002, Anchor Bay released a Region 2 DVD, but contained the US recut. Soon afterwards, Dutch budget label Indies Home Entertainment released a Region 2 disc which also contained the US cut but includes forced Dutch subtitles. In 2004, a DVD was released by Hollywood DVD in the UK with the US cut. Trinity Home Entertainment released their DVD in the United States the same year; Trinity tried to get the full cut, but when they were unable to obtain it, they ended up settling with using the truncated US version. Trinity's DVD was re-released by Phase 4 Films in 2010.

In 2005, Australian distributor Umbrella Entertainment released both cuts on Region 4 DVD (they also released the full theatrical cut of Watership Down), sourced from Rosen's private print. The same print was later released on Region 2 DVD in the UK by Optimum Releasing in 2007.

In 2017, Shout! Factory announced that they had acquired the rights to the film in the United States, and that they would release the film for the first time on Blu-ray on 24 February 2018 under their Shout Select line. In late 2017, Shout! Factory announced that they had delayed the film's Blu-ray release to work with director Rosen in hopes of releasing the original version instead of the edit. In September 2018, Shout! Factory announced that the original version would be released on Blu-ray on 15 January 2019. The 2019 release includes both a 2K restoration of the original cut and the edit, as well as an interview with director Rosen regarding production. Screenbound Films also released a Blu-ray in the UK on 10 August 2020, likewise containing both cuts.

It was also featured on The Criterion Channel as part of their arthouse animation lineup.
