= Arthur Humberstone =

British film animator (1912-1999)

- Born: 17 April 1912; Britain
- Died: 31 December 1999 (aged 87)
- Occupations: Animator, artist and director
- Years active: 1949-1999

Arthur Roland Humberstone (17 April 1912 – 31 December 1999) was a British animator, artist and director, whose credits included Animal Farm, Yellow Submarine and The BFG.

In 1946, Arthur was one of the trainee animators enlisted at J Arthur Rank's new studio being set up at Moor Hall in Cookham led by ex-Disney Director David Hand, where he animated several Animaland shorts.

He worked with Halas & Batchelor and as a senior animator with Martin Rosen on Watership Down and The Plague Dogs.

Arthur Humberstone's influence on the film Watership Down is discussed in the chapter "Revisiting the production of Watership Down through the Arthur Humberstone Animation Archive" in the book Watership Down: Perspectives On and Beyond Animated Violence.

An exhibition Four Legs Good, Two Legs Bad, of materials from the Arthur Humberstone Animation Archive, was shown at The Horse Hospital 13th April - 5th May 2023.

An exhibition The Animated Life of Arthur Humberstone was shown at the Post Hall, Sheffield Hallam University 8th March - 5th April 2025.

== Filmography ==
Year	Title	Notes	Refs
1949	Ginger Nutt's Christmas Circus		
1950	Ginger Nutt's Forest Dragon		
1954	Animal Farm		
1963	Noddy Goes to Toyland	director and animator	
1968	Yellow Submarine		
1972	The Osmonds		
1973	The Addams Family	unit director	
1974	The Count of Monte Cristo		
1978	Watership Down	senior animator	
1979	The Lion, The Witch and the Wardrobe		
1982	The Plague Dogs	senior animator	
1983	SuperTed	layout artist, one episode	
1989	The BFG	key animator	
