= Lapine language =

Fictional language from Richard Adams' novel Watership Down

Lapine
- Created by: Richard Adams
- Date: 1972
- Setting and usage: Watership Down; Tales from Watership Down
- Users: None
- Purpose: Constructed language: fictional; Lapine

Language codes
- ISO 639-3: None (mis)
- Glottolog: None

Lapine is a fictional language created by author Richard Adams for his 1972 novel Watership Down, where it is spoken by rabbit characters. The language was again used in Adams's 1996 sequel, Tales from Watership Down, and has appeared in both the film and television adaptations. The fragments of language presented by Adams consist of a few dozen distinct words, and are chiefly used for the naming of rabbits, their mythological characters, and objects in their world. The name "Lapine" comes from the French word for rabbit, lapin, and can also be used to describe rabbit society.

== History ==
The words of the Lapine language were developed by Adams piecemeal and organically as required by the circumstances of the plot. In a Reddit "Ask Me Anything" interview, Adams noted that "I just constructed Lapine as I went—when the rabbits needed a word for something so did I." Reflecting on his inspirations for the words, Adams stated that "some of them are onomatopoeic like hrududu (motor vehicle), but overall they simply came from my subconscious". Adams commented that the motivation for the sound of Lapine was that it should sound "wuffy, fluffy" as in the word "Efrafa". Writing for The Guardian, Keren Levy described the Lapine language as "somehow easy to accept as [a language] we have always known. It is the language of the countryside, of its copses and beeches and of the weather."

The sound of Lapine has been ascribed to influence from Welsh, Irish, Scottish Gaelic and Arabic languages. Author Stephen Cain bolsters the Arabic connection by noting in particular that "Adams had occasion to study [Arabic] during his military service in the Middle East." The Lapine language has also been frequently compared to Sindarin (the language of the Elves in J.R.R. Tolkien's Middle-earth series) in terms of its effect on setting in the novels. Following the success of Watership Down, Richard Adams would go on to invent another constructed language for his Beklan novels, Shardik (1974) and Maia (1984).

== Linguistic analyses ==
Some fans of the book, including authors and academics, have written about the words and phrases extant in the corpus of Watership Down and have analyzed the language and its variations on a linguistic level.

Within the books, the rabbits' use of Lapine is presented to readers as Standard English with the inclusion of a number of specialized Lapine lexical terms. Albert Valdman notes that inter-rabbit Lapine is alternately formal and colloquial "marked by hesitations, interruptions, interjections, incomplete sentences, and false starts". Pit Corder breaks this down further, finding that the Lapine spoken by the rabbits consists of 64% simple sentences, 14% compound sentences (with 30% paratactic and 70% marked coordination), and 22% complex sentences. The mean Lapine sentence length is 6.3 words.

Adams includes a glossary of all Lapine words in the book at the end. Notable traits include the plural marker -il (which replaces a final vowel if it is present in the singular: hrududu, "automobile", pl. hrududil), and the fact that cardinal numbers only go up to four, with any number above that being called hrair, "many", although the runt Hrairoo's name is translated into English as "Fiver" instead. The use of Lapine words is often (although not exclusively) used to indicate concepts unique to rabbits, such as silflay (aboveground grazing) or tharn (freezing behavior).

When speaking to other animals, the rabbits adopt a lingua franca known as "Hedgerow." However, in both examples given in the book (i.e. the mouse and Kehaar the gull) the conversation reverts to Lapine once initial contact has been established. More specifically, the rabbits adopt formal Lapine; the other animals employ a Lapine Foreigner Talk that Corder describes as "a reduced code or incipient pidgin". He further notes that the general rules of "Foreigner Talk" are well-established in societies, even among natives who have never communicated with a foreigner. Corder attributes the learning of the rules of "Foreigner Talk" to its use within native-speaker-oriented literature and other media as a proxy for interlanguage.

Because Lapine is presented in the novels as Standard English, Lapine Foreigner Talk is essentially English Foreigner Talk with a Lapine gloss; thus, it provides an example of linguistic enculturation for children who read the books. Breaking down the syntax of Lapine Foreigner Talk to compare with that of standard Lapine, Corder finds that they are roughly the same with the only notable difference being an inversion of the proportion of paratactic to marked coordination in compound sentences. Specifically, Corder reports Lapine Foreigner Talk to consist of 73% simple sentences, 15% compound sentences (70% paratactic and 30% marked coordination), and 12% complex sentences (with 60% complemented by the four verbs "think", "know", "say", and "tell"). Valdman further notes differences between the Lapine Foreigner Talk used to facilitate discussion as with Kehaar the gull, and that used to signal the depreciated status of the unnamed mouse (a less powerful animal in the rabbit world).

== Usage outside the novel ==
The use of Lapine outside of the fictional world of the novels has been explored by Thomas E. Murray, who notes that the Lapine word "silflay" (meaning "To go above ground to feed. Literally, to feed outside.") has entered the English lexicon as more than a mere nonce word. In a survey Murray found that the term was in use (meaning "the act of rabbits eating above-ground") primarily in the Midwest and North Central United States. He also noted differing levels of use according to socioeconomic status with usage highest among middle and lower middle class speakers. Murray suggests that the geographical spread of the term may in part be limited by interactions with rabbits, highlighting the comment of a New York City-based survey participant who knew the word but never used it due to the lack of rabbits in the city. Murray also claims that the Lapine word "Crixa" (meaning "The center of Efrafa, at the crossing point of two bridle paths") has also gained usage outside the novel: it is used by students to refer to the residential dormitories within Ohio State University.

Lapine has been described as easy to learn due to its emphasis on nouns, and it has been praised as a didactic tool for budding linguists and learners of English as a second language.

== Linguistic development ==
Linguists, academics, and fans of the original novel have further developed and refined the Lapine language since its 1972 creation. Authors, such as Patrick Jemmer (who corresponded briefly with Adams regarding Lapine), have made large-scale "recreations" of various possible historical stages of the language. Jemmer's work documents the evolution of numerous inter-related languages (the process of development and analysis is called "aleolinguistics"). It contains comprehensive syntax for each linguistic stage (or "aleostate"), and vocabularies involving approximately 2000 lexemes. Sample scripts and comparative texts are available.
