= Simon Vaughan =

British film and television producer

- Born: 13 January 1970 (age 56); Kingston-Upon-Thames, England
- Education: Danes Hill school Italia Conti Academy of Theatre Arts
- Occupations: Producer and executive producer; Founder of Lookout Point; Co-founder of The Story Collective; Chairman of The Story Works film and television studios
- Spouse: Justine Vaughan (m. 1997; div. 2024)

Simon Vaughan (born 13 January 1970) is a British film and television producer and executive producer. He is known for his work in British and international television drama, including Ripper Street, War & Peace, Les Misérables and Parades End. Vaughan began his career as a child actor after being cast as Freddie Mainwaring in the BBC series Grange Hill.

In 2009 Vaughan founded Lookout Point, a London-based drama production company. Vaughan acted as CEO (and later chairman and joint-CEO) before stepping down in January 2019, following the sale of Lookout Point to the BBC.

In 2019 Vaughan launched The Media Investment Company with former BBC Studios executive Helen Jackson. In June 2021, the company re-launched as The Story Company announcing a new partnership with LA-based Fifth Season.

Vaughan is chairman of The Story Works, a film and television studio occupying a 22-acre riverside site in southwest London.

== Early life ==
Vaughan was born in Kingston-Upon-Thames. He attended Danes Hill school in Surrey and Italia Conti Academy of Theatre Arts. Vaughan began his professional acting career in 1981 (aged 11) as Macduff's son in Macbeth at the Thorndike Theatre. He played Peter in the stage adaptation of The Railway Children at the Crucible Theatre, Sheffield in 1984, and appeared as Freddie Mainwaring in the BBC's long running series Grange Hill between 1987 and 1988.

== Career ==
In 1991, Vaughan joined Pickwick Home Video (part of the Carlton Television group) which acquired and sold the rights to Beatrix Potter's The World of Peter Rabbit and Friends (1993). In 1993, Vaughan joined BMG Entertainment where he commissioned Peter and the Wolf for the ABC Network, which won an Emmy Award for Best Children's Programme in 1995, and The Wind in The Willows collection for the Disney Channel and Channel 4.

After leaving BMG, Vaughan took the television rights to the Watership Down franchise with him and formed his own company, Alltime Entertainment, in order to produce the series. Watership Down, co-produced with Decode Entertainment in Canada, aired on ITV, Disney Channel and ProSieben and lasted for three seasons and thirty-nine episodes. Vaughan later delivered the television film A Bear Named Winnie (2004) starring Michael Fassbender in his first lead role. In 2005 Vaughan co-founded Alchemy Television, a UK-based and US-based producer and distributor, where he executive-produced Emmy-nominated television film Coco Chanel (2008), starring Shirley MacLaine and Ben Hur (2010) for ABC Network. Alchemy also invested in and distributed The Company (2007), Ridley Scott's CIA origin story for TNT & BBC and 5 seasons of procedural crime series Flashpoint for CBS.

In 2009, Vaughan founded the London-based drama production company Lookout Point, which was fully acquired by the BBC Group in 2018. At Lookout Point, Vaughan executive-produced television programmes including, Titanic (2012) written by Julian Fellowes for ITV and ABC Network, Parade's End (2012) for the BBC and HBO, starring Benedict Cumberbatch, which won the British Academy Television Award for Best Mini-Series in 2013 and Ripper Street (2012–2016), which ran on the BBC for five seasons.

In 2016 Vaughan executive-produced War and Peace (2016) for the BBC which was adapted by Andrew Davies and won a BAFTA award for production design in 2017; and The Collection (2016) which was created by Oliver Goldstick and was Amazon's first European original commission.

Lookout Point has also produced: Les Misérables (2018) for the BBC written by Andrew Davies and starring Olivia Colman, Dominic West and David Oyelowo, Mike Bartlett's Press for BBC One and PBS (2018); and Sally Wainwright's series Gentleman Jack for the BBC and HBO, starring Suranne Jones who won a British Academy Television Award for Best Actress for her role in 2020.

In 2017 Vaughan co-wrote and executive-produced the feature film Goodbye Christopher Robin (2017) for Fox Searchlight starring Margot Robbie and Domhnall Gleeson.

In 2019, Vaughan launched the Media Investment Company with former BBC Studios executive Helen Jackson. In June 2020, the company re-launched as The Story Collective, forming a partnership with Los Angeles-based Fifth Season. In 2026, the company released season two of their Disney+ show A Thousand Blows, written by Steven Knight and starring Stephen Graham and Erin Doherty.

Vaughan is also CEO and founder of Story Works Studios, a film and television studio development located at the former Mortlake Brewery site in southwest London. This studio provides full-service production facilities and creative support for scripted projects.

== Credits ==
=== Television ===
Year	Series	Credit
1999	Watership Down	Executive producer
2010	Ben Hur	Producer
2011	Combat Hospital	Executive producer
2012	Titanic	Executive producer
2012	Parade's End	Executive producer
2012–2014	Ripper Street	Executive producer
2016	War and Peace	Executive producer
2016	The Collection	Executive producer
2018	Les Misérables	Executive producer

=== Film and Television Film ===
Year	Film	Credit
2004	A Bear Named Winnie	Executive producer
2005	Wallis & Edward	Executive producer
2008	Coco Chanel	Executive producer
2009	Diamonds	Producer
2017	Goodbye Christopher Robin	Writer & executive producer

=== As an actor ===
Year	Film	Role
1987–1988	Grange Hill	Fred Mainwaring
1988	ScreenPlay	Philip
1998	Double Fist	Gonzo
1998	Screen Two	Andrew Harvey
