= Stacking (film) =

- Directed by: Martin Rosen
- Written by: Victoria Jenkins
- Produced by: Martin Rosen
- Starring: Christine Lahti; Frederic Forrest; Megan Follows; Jason Gedrick; James Gammon; Jacqueline Brookes; Irene Dailey
- Cinematography: Richard Bowen
- Edited by: Patrick Dodd
- Music by: Patrick Gleeson
- Production companies: American Playhouse Theatrical Productions; Nelson Entertainment; Nepenthe Productions
- Distributed by: International Spectrafilm
- Release date: January 22, 1987 (US Film Festival)
- Running time: 97 minutes
- Country: United States
- Language: English

Stacking, also known as Season of Dreams, is a 1987 American drama film directed by Martin Rosen, starring Christine Lahti, Frederic Forrest, Megan Follows, Jason Gedrick, James Gammon, Jacqueline Brookes, and Irene Dailey. The film premiered at the US Film Festival under the title Season of Dreams on January 22, 1987. Following a change of title to Stacking, the film had a brief theatrical release in various cities including Los Angeles starting October 9, 1987, in Atlanta at some point in 1987, in New York City starting January 15, 1988, and in Toledo, Ohio on January 29, 1988, before being broadcast as episode 3 of season 8 of American Playhouse on February 15, 1989.

== Cast ==
- Christine Lahti as Kathleen Morgan
- Frederic Forrest as Buster McGuire
- Megan Follows as Anna Mae Morgan
- Jason Gedrick as Gary Connaloe
- James Gammon as Clate Connaloe
- Jacqueline Brookes as Mrs. Connaloe
- Irene Dailey as Mrs. McGuire
- Ray Baker as Dan Morgan
- Peter Coyote as Photographer
- Kaiulani Lee as Connie van Buskirk
- Lucy Deakins

== Reception ==
Vincent Canby of The New York Times wrote, "'Stacking' has a lot of pretty Montana scenery and a lot of not-great music on the soundtrack. Yet it has no real drive or personality of its own. It looks like a movie made as a cooperative venture by film students with a fairly fancy budget." Michael Wilmington of the Los Angeles Times wrote that "At the end, Anna Mae’s progression has a foreordained feel; not really privy to a struggle or a triumph. Yet it’s a decent film with decent intentions and values. Nowadays, that can sometimes be recommendation enough." Joe Baltake rated the film 2 stars out of 5, calling it "a case of a movie getting longer with each cut."
