= Watership Down =

1972 adventure novel by Richard Adams

- First edition cover
- Author: Richard Adams
- Language: English, Lapine
- Genre: Fantasy
- Publisher: Rex Collings
- Publication date: November 1972
- Publication place: United Kingdom
- Media type: Print (hardback, paperback & audiobook)
- Pages: 413 (first edition) plus maps
- Awards: Carnegie Medal; Guardian Children's Fiction Prize; California Young Reader Medal
- ISBN: 0-901720-31-3
- OCLC: 633254
- Dewey Decimal: 823/.9/14
- LC Class: PZ10.3.A197 Wat
- Followed by: Tales from Watership Down

Watership Down is an adventure novel by English author Richard Adams. Set in Hampshire in southern England, the story features a small group of rabbits. Although they live in their natural wild environment, with burrows, they are anthropomorphised, possessing their own culture, language, proverbs, poetry, and mythology. Evoking epic themes, the novel follows the rabbits as they escape the destruction of their warren and seek a place to establish a new home (the hill of Watership Down), encountering perils and temptations along the way.

Watership Down was Richard Adams's debut novel. It was rejected by several publishers before Collings accepted the manuscript; the published book then won the annual Carnegie Medal (UK), annual Guardian Prize (UK), and other book awards.

The novel was adapted into a 2D animated feature film in 1978 and a 2D animated children's television series from 1999 and 2001. In 2018, the novel was adapted again, this time into a 3D animated series, which both aired in the UK and was made available on Netflix.

Adams completed a sequel almost 25 years later, in 1996, Tales from Watership Down, (Note: Random House; Hutchinson and Alfred A. Knopf imprints) constructed as a collection of 19 short stories about El-ahrairah and the rabbits of the Watership Down warren.

== Origin and publication history ==
"To Juliet and Rosamund, remembering the road to Stratford-on-Avon"

— Dedication, Watership Down

"Master Rabbit I saw" —Walter de la Mare

— Line quoted in Watership Down; the poem can be seen as a possible source of inspiration.

The story began as tales that Richard Adams told his young daughters Juliet and Rosamond during long car journeys. He recounted in 2007 that he "began telling the story of the rabbits ... improvised off the top of [his] head, as [they] were driving along". The daughters insisted he write it down—"they were very, very persistent". After some delay, Adams began writing the novel in the evenings; he completed it 18 months later. The book is dedicated to the two girls.

Adams's descriptions of wild rabbit behaviour were based on The Private Life of the Rabbit (1964), by British naturalist Ronald Lockley. The two later became friends, embarking on an Antarctic tour that became the subject of a co-authored book, Voyage Through the Antarctic (A. Lane, 1982).

In his autobiography, The Day Gone By, Adams wrote that he based Watership Down and the stories in it on his experiences during Operation Market Garden, the Battle of Arnhem, in 1944. The character of Hazel, the leader of the group of rabbits, was modelled on Adams's commanding officer, Major John Gifford. He gave the warrior Bigwig the personality of Captain Desmond Kavanagh, who is buried at the Airborne Cemetery in Oosterbeek, The Netherlands.

Watership Down was rejected seven times before it was accepted by Rex Collings. The one-man London publisher Collings wrote to an associate, "I've just taken on a novel about rabbits, one of them with extra-sensory perception. Do you think I'm mad?" The associate did call it "a mad risk," in her obituary of Collings, to accept "a book as bizarre by an unknown writer which had been turned down by the major London publishers; but," she continued, "it was also dazzlingly brave and intuitive." Collings had little capital and could not pay an advance but "he got a review copy onto every desk in London that mattered." Adams wrote that it was Collings who gave Watership Down its title. There was a second edition released in 1973.

Macmillan USA, then a media giant, published the first US edition in 1974; a Dutch edition was also published that year by Het Spectrum.

== Plot summary ==
=== Part 1: The Journey ===
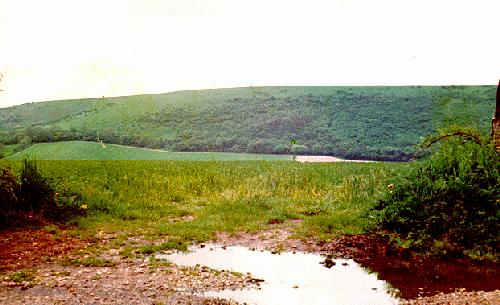
Watership Down, the hill near the Hampshire village of Kingsclere where the novel was set (1975)

In the Sandleford warren, Fiver, a runty young rabbit who is a seer, receives a frightening vision of his warren's imminent destruction. (Note: The map in the front of the book indicates the story begins in the real-life Wash Common, just beyond the western tip of the park and parish of Sandleford, on the Berkshire-Hampshire border.) He and his brother Hazel fail to convince the Threarah, their Chief Rabbit, of the need to evacuate; they then try to convince the other rabbits, but only succeed in gaining nine followers, all bucks (males) and no does (females). Captain Holly of the Sandleford Owsla, the warren's military caste, accuses the group of fomenting dissension against the Threarah. He tries to stop them from leaving, but is driven off.

Once out in the world, the travelling group of rabbits finds itself following the leadership of Hazel, who had been considered an unimportant member of the warren. The group travels far through dangerous territory. Bigwig and Silver, both former Owsla and the strongest rabbits among them, protect the others, helped by Hazel's good judgement and the ingenuity of the clever rabbit Blackberry. Along the way, they cross the River Enborne, and evade a badger, a dog, a crow, and a car. Hazel and Bigwig also stop three rabbits from attempting to return to the Sandleford warren.

A rabbit named Cowslip invites Hazel's group to join his warren, where a farmer leaves food for the rabbits and shoots all the predators. Fiver senses death and deception in Cowslip's warren, but the rest of Hazel's group, enjoying the peace and good food, decide to ignore Fiver's warnings and the strange and evasive behaviour of the warren rabbits. Later, Bigwig is caught in a snare, only surviving the ordeal thanks to Blackberry and Hazel's quick thinking. Deducing the truth, Fiver admonishes the rest in a wild lecture; the farmer feeds and protects the rabbits so he can harvest them for meat and skins, and Cowslip's rabbits invited the guests into their warren to increase their own odds of survival. The Sandleford rabbits, badly shaken, continue on their journey. They are joined by Strawberry, a buck who deserts Cowslip's warren.

=== Part 2: On Watership Down ===
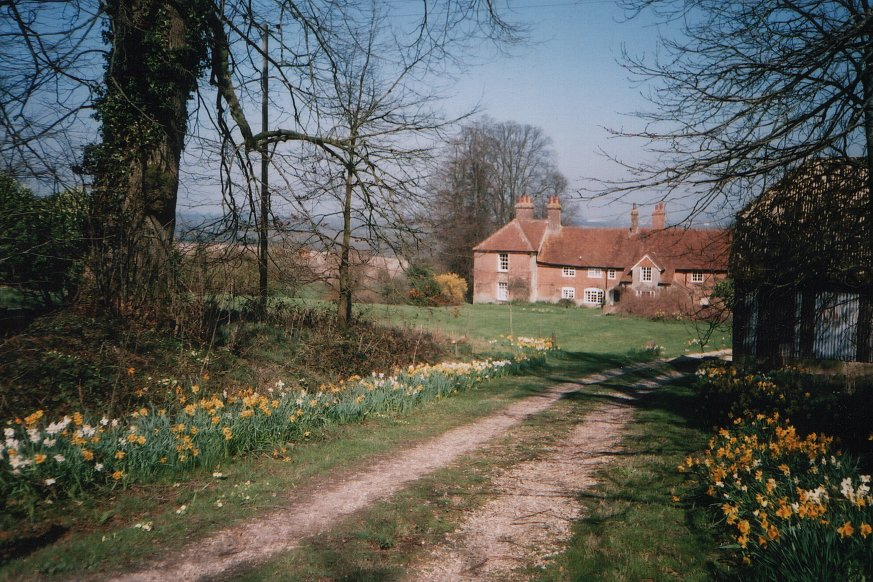
Nuthanger Farm, Hampshire, England, in 2004.

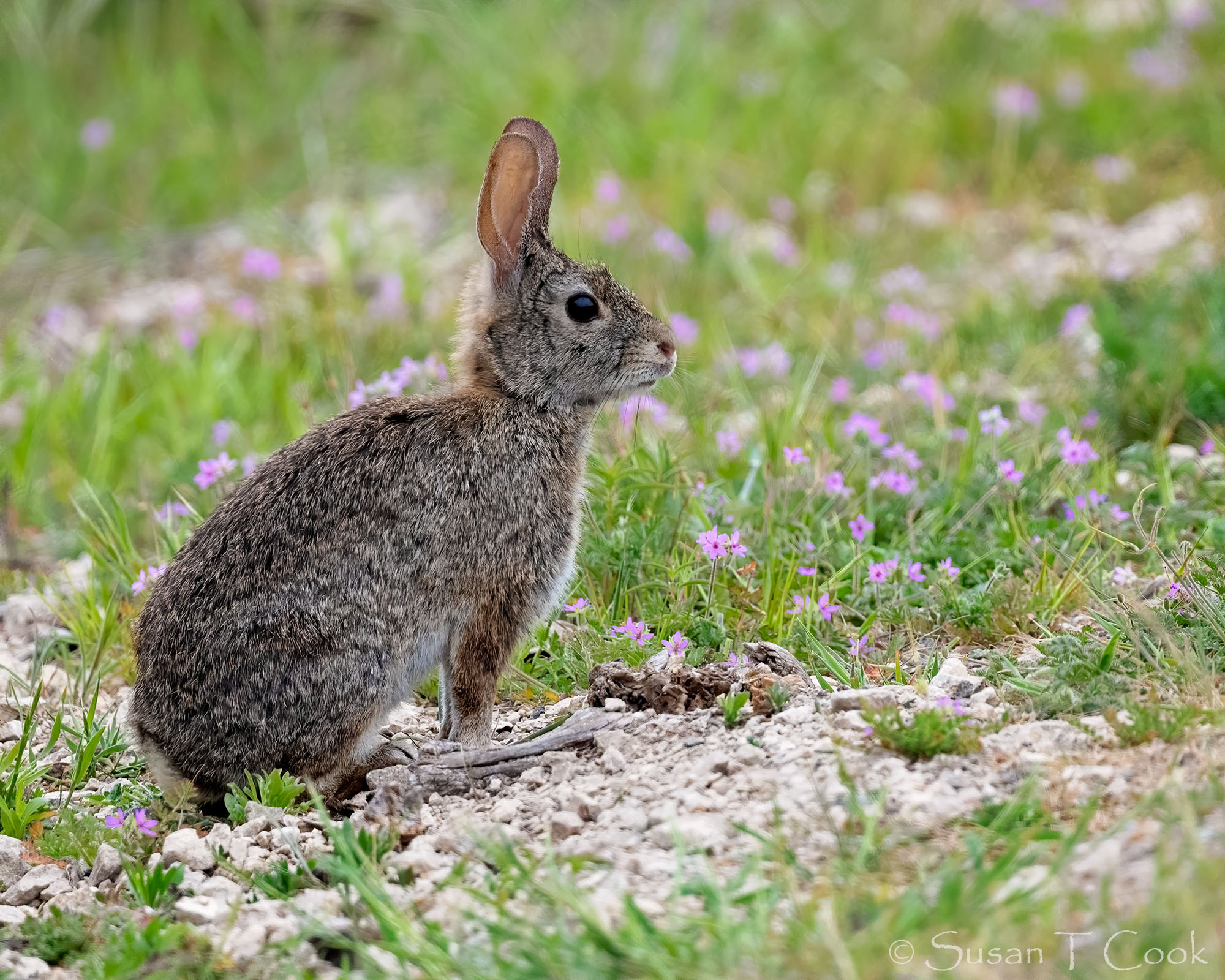
A rabbit in a meadow.

Fiver's visions instruct the rabbits to seek a home atop the hills. The group eventually finds and settles in a beech hanger (a wooded hill) on Watership Down. While digging the new warren, they are joined by Captain Holly and his friend Bluebell. Holly is severely wounded, and both rabbits are ill from exhaustion, having escaped both the violent destruction of the Sandleford Warren by humans and an attack by Cowslip's rabbits along the way. Holly's ordeal has left him a changed rabbit and, after telling the others that Fiver's terrible vision has come true, he offers to join Hazel's band in whatever way they will have him.

Although Watership Down is a peaceful habitat, Hazel realises that, with all buck rabbits and no does, the warren will soon die out. With the help of their useful new friend, a black-headed gull named Kehaar, they discover a nearby warren called Efrafa, which is overcrowded. At Hazel's request, Holly leads a small embassy to Efrafa to present their request for does. And more rabbits.

Hazel and Pipkin (the smallest rabbit) decide to scout out the nearby Nuthanger Farm, where they find a rabbit hutch. Despite their uncertainty about living wild, the four hutch rabbits are willing to come to Watership. Two nights later, Hazel leads a raid on the farm, which frees two does and a buck from the hutch. Hazel is wounded in the leg by the farmer's shotgun and presumed dead; Fiver's visions prompt him and Blackberry to return and rescue Hazel. When the embassy to Efrafa returns soon after, Hazel and his rabbits learn that Efrafa is a police state run by the despotic General Woundwort, who refuses to allow anyone to leave his warren. Holly and his three companions have managed to escape with little more than their lives.

=== Part 3: Efrafa ===
While they were imprisoned in Efrafa, Holly's group had met an Efrafan doe named Hyzenthlay, who wishes to leave the warren and can recruit other does to join in the escape. Hazel and Blackberry devise a plan to rescue Hyzenthlay's group and bring them to Watership Down.

Bigwig infiltrates Efrafa in the guise of a 'hlessi' (a wandering rabbit unattached to any warren). He is recruited into the Efrafan Owsla by Woundwort, while Hazel and several other Watership rabbits hide across the nearby River Test. With help from Kehaar, Bigwig manages to free Hyzenthlay and nine other does, as well as a condemned Efrafan prisoner named Blackavar. Woundwort and his officers pursue them, but the Watership rabbits and the escapees use a punt to float away down the Test and escape.

=== Part 4: Hazel-rah ===
Downriver, the punt strikes a bridge, killing one doe. Once the rabbits are back on shore, they begin the long journey home, losing one more doe to a fox along the way. As they near Watership, they come across Captain Campion and his Efrafan patrol, who have been tracking them. Blackavar advises Hazel that the patrol must be killed to prevent them from reporting to Woundwort, but Hazel spares them and sends them off.

A few weeks later, the Owsla of Efrafa, led by Woundwort, unexpectedly arrives to destroy the warren at Watership Down and take back the escapees. Fiver experiences another vision, which gives Hazel the solution to the problem. While Bigwig fights and injures Woundwort in a narrow tunnel, preventing the rest of the Efrafans from getting any further into the burrows, Hazel, Dandelion and Blackberry return to Nuthanger Farm. They release Bob, the farmer's Labrador dog, and lure him back to Watership Down. Bob attacks the Efrafans, who flee in terror, leaving Woundwort to stubbornly stand his ground unobserved. Following the fight, Bob returns to Nuthanger Farm with a few wounds, but there is no sign of Woundwort's body. Groundsel, one of the Efrafan officers, fervently believes the General must have survived.

After releasing Bob, Hazel is attacked by Tab, one of the farmhouse cats. He is saved by young Lucy, the former owner of the escaped hutch rabbits, who shows him to the local doctor before releasing him. Upon returning to Watership, Hazel effects a lasting peace and friendship between the remaining Efrafans and the Watership rabbits. Some time later, Hazel and Campion, the intelligent new chief of Efrafa, send rabbits to start a new warren at Caesar's Belt, to relieve the effects of overcrowding at both their warrens.

=== Epilogue ===
As time goes on, the three warrens on the downs prosper under Hazel, Campion and Groundsel (their respective chiefs). General Woundwort is never seen or heard from again; he becomes a legend among the rabbits, and a sort of bogeyman to frighten rabbit kits. Kehaar rejoins his colony, but continues to visit the rabbits every winter. He refuses to search for Woundwort, showing that even he still fears him.

Years later, on a cold March morning, an elderly Hazel is visited by El-ahrairah, the legendary rabbit folk hero and spiritual Prince of the Rabbits. He invites Hazel to join his Owsla, reassuring Hazel of Watership's future success and prosperity. Leaving his friends and his physical body behind, Hazel departs Watership Down with El-ahrairah.

== Characters ==
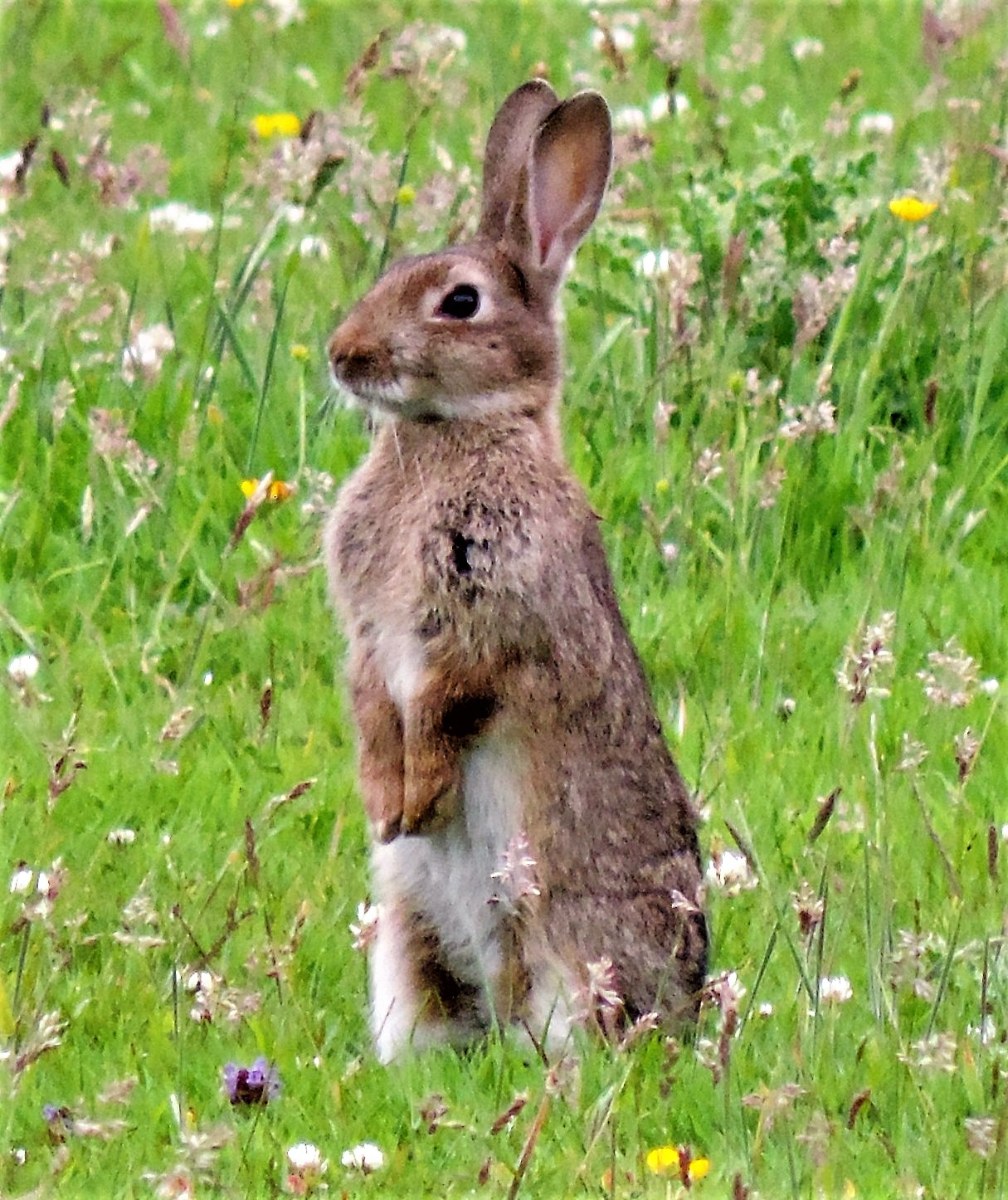
A rabbit on alert

=== Rabbits ===
Sandleford warren

- Hazel/Hazel-rah: The novel's protagonist. Though Hazel is not particularly large or powerful, he is loyal, brave, affectionate and a quick thinker. He sees the good in individuals, and what they bring to the table; in so doing, he makes sure no one gets left behind, thus earning the respect and loyalty of his warren. He becomes their Chief Rabbit in the process, with his name accordingly expanded to Hazel-rah ("Chief Hazel" or "Prince Hazel" in Lapine). He often relies on Fiver's advice, and he trusts his brother's instincts most of the time.
- Fiver: Hazel's younger brother, a runt rabbit whose Lapine name means "Little One of Many" (rabbits have a single word, "hrair"—sometimes translated as "thousand"—for all numbers greater than four. Fiver's name in Lapine, Hrairoo, indicates that he is the smallest of a litter of five or more rabbits.) As a seer, he has visions and strong instincts. He is shy, kind, and intelligent, and though he does not directly act as a leader, the others listen to and follow his advice. Vilthuril becomes his mate.
- Bigwig: An ex-Owsla officer, and the largest, strongest, and bravest rabbit of the group. His name in Lapine is Thlayli, which literally means "Fur-head" and refers to the shock of fur on the back of his head. Though he is initially harsh and cynical, he is naturally compassionate and eventually learns to be less quick-tempered. He is also shown to be cunning in his own way when he rescues the does from Efrafa, and later devises a plan to defeat the larger and stronger General Woundwort. This final confrontation leaves him severely wounded, but he survives and becomes the leader of Hazel's Owsla.
- Blackberry: A clever buck rabbit with black-tipped ears. He is often capable of understanding concepts the other rabbits find incomprehensible. He realises, for instance, that wood floats, and the rabbits use this tactic twice to travel on water. He also works out how to dismantle the snare that almost kills Bigwig, saving him. He is one of Hazel's most trusted advisors, and he and Kehaar devise the plan to rescue does from Efrafa.
- Dandelion: Described as a "dashing" buck rabbit, notable for his storytelling ability and speed. He is the first to recognise Watership Down as their best new home, and is instrumental in both raids on Nuthanger farm.
- Buckthorn: A strong half-grown buck who was expected to be part of the Sandleford Owsla once he reached maturity. He joins Bigwig and Silver as a fighter for the group.
- Hawkbit: Described in the book as a "rather slow, stupid rabbit", but is accepted by Hazel regardless.
- Speedwell and Acorn: Pair of rank-and-file rabbits who are friends of Hawkbit. Like him, they are initially distrustful of Hazel, but soon become valuable sentries and burrow diggers.
- Silver: The sturdy and level-headed nephew of Sandleford's Chief Rabbit. At Sandleford, he is teased for his pale grey fur (his namesake) and accused of getting his position in the Owsla through nepotism, prompting him to join the fugitives. He, Bigwig and Buckthorn frequently defend the other rabbits along their journey.
- Pipkin: A small and initially timid buck rabbit. Hazel refuses to leave him behind when he is wounded, and Pipkin grows fiercely loyal to Hazel. He serves as a comforter to Holly, and becomes very brave, offering to go into Efrafa himself when Bigwig is late in returning. He also is the first to jump into the River Test, when Hazel orders the rabbits to do so. His name is Hlao-roo ("Little Dimple in the Grass") in Lapine.
- Holly: Former captain of the Sandleford Warren Owsla, escapes with Bluebell when his warren is destroyed by men. He is near death when he finds the warren at Watership Down, but is nursed back to health and welcomed by the fugitives.
- Bluebell: Buck rabbit who escapes with Holly during the destruction of Sandleford. He tells jokes (often in rhyme) to cope, and to help himself and Holly recover from the mental strain of seeing the Sandleford warren destroyed and Pimpernel killed by Cowslip's rabbits. He, like Dandelion, is also a storyteller.
- Pimpernel: A Sandleford rabbit, who helps Bluebell to escape the poisoning of the Sandleford warren but becomes very ill and weak in the process. He travels towards Watership with Holly and Bluebell, but is murdered by Cowslip's rabbits.
- Toadflax: A Sandleford rabbit, who was part of the Owsla. He was quite abusive of his power as he and another Owsla officer chased Hazel and Fiver away when they were about to eat cowslip. Toadflax escaped the destruction of the Sandleford warren with Holly, Bluebell and Pimpernel, but had inhaled so much poison that he went mad and died.
- Threarah: Usually called "THE Threarah" because his name means "Lord/Prince Rowan Tree" in Lapine, and there is only one rowan near the warren. He is Silver's uncle as well as the cool and detached leader of the Sandleford Warren. He believes in the gift of foresight, but dismisses Fiver's fears, believing rabbits can best weather any dangers by sitting tight. He is presumed killed when the men poison his warren.

Cowslip's warren

- Cowslip: The minor antagonist of the novel. While not chief rabbit of his warren, he is the first to meet Hazel and the others, and tricks them into staying in the Warren of the Snares, which is why they refer to it as "Cowslip's Warren" afterwards. He and the others refuse to answer any questions or discuss the snares. After Fiver exposes and ruins their blissful denial and Strawberry defects to Fiver's side, Cowslip leads some other rabbits to attack Holly's group as it passes through their territory.
- Strawberry: A large, sleek buck from Cowslip's warren who leaves with the Watership Down rabbits after his doe, Nildro-hain ("Blackbird's Song", in Lapine), is killed by a snare. He has good knowledge about warren architecture.

Nuthanger Farm

- Haystack and Clover: Two of the hutch does, who escape in order to live with the wild rabbits. Clover's mate, Laurel, does not escape with her and allows himself to be taken back to the hutch by the farmer. Later, Holly becomes Clover's new mate.
- Boxwood: A hutch buck who escapes in order to live with the wild rabbits. He is taken under Strawberry's wing, as he initially does not know how to survive in the wild. He is Haystack's mate.

Efrafa

- General Woundwort: The main antagonist of the novel. A fearless, cunning and brutally efficient rabbit who was orphaned at a young age and raised by humans, Woundwort escaped, founded the Efrafa warren, and is its tyrannical chief. Though larger and stronger than Bigwig, he lacks mercy and kindness. He even leads an attack to destroy the Watership warren as an act of revenge against Bigwig's stealing does from Efrafa, an attack defeated by Hazel's ingenuity and Bigwig's bravery. After fighting the Nuthanger farm dog, he disappears completely, and many rabbits remain unsure if he still lives or not.
- Captain Campion: Woundwort's most trusted subordinate, Campion is a loyal, brave and clever officer. Despite being on opposite sides, Bigwig and Hazel like Campion and twice refuse to kill him when they have him at their mercy. After Woundwort disappears, Campion becomes the Chief Rabbit of Efrafa and reforms it, making peace with the Watership rabbits.
- Vervain: The sadistic and callous head of the Owslafa (Council Police) in Efrafa, said to be one of the most hated rabbits in the warren. He is ordered to kill Fiver during the Watership attack, but Fiver calmly prophesies his death, and he flees in terror. He disappears during the retreat back to Efrafa, presumably killed by predators.
- Groundsel: A calm, sensible member of Woundwort's Owsla, he rescues an Efrafan patrol when their Captain is killed by a fox. He accompanies Woundwort to Watership with the rest of the Owsla, though he is wisely hesitant to attack Hazel's rabbits after their earlier displays of cleverness. He and four others surrender to Fiver after the dog incident, and he is accepted into Watership as a friend, eventually becoming the Chief Rabbit at the new warren in Caesar's Belt.
- Hyzenthlay: A doe who leads other Efrafan does to oppose Woundwort and his council, as they are unable to reproduce because of overcrowding. Woundwort orders her group to be broken up and scattered across the warren; however, she and several friends escape Efrafa with Bigwig. Like Fiver, she has visions, but has trouble interpreting them. Her name means literally "shine-dew-fur", or "fur shining like dew".
- Thethuthinnang: In Lapine, "Movement of Leaves". A very sturdy, sensible doe and Hyzenthlay's friend and lieutenant in organising the rebellion among the Efrafan does.
- Vilthuril: An Efrafan doe—her name's translation is never given. She escapes Efrafa with Bigwig, Hyzenthlay and the other does. She becomes Fiver's mate, and is said to be the only one to understand him, other than Hazel. One of their kittens, Threar, becomes a seer like his father.
- Blackavar: A rabbit with dark fur who tries to escape from Efrafa but is apprehended, mutilated, and put on display to discourage further escape attempts. When he is liberated by Bigwig, he quickly proves himself an expert tracker and ranger, and also shows himself to be an effective fighter when the Efrafan rabbits attack the warren.

=== Non-rabbits ===
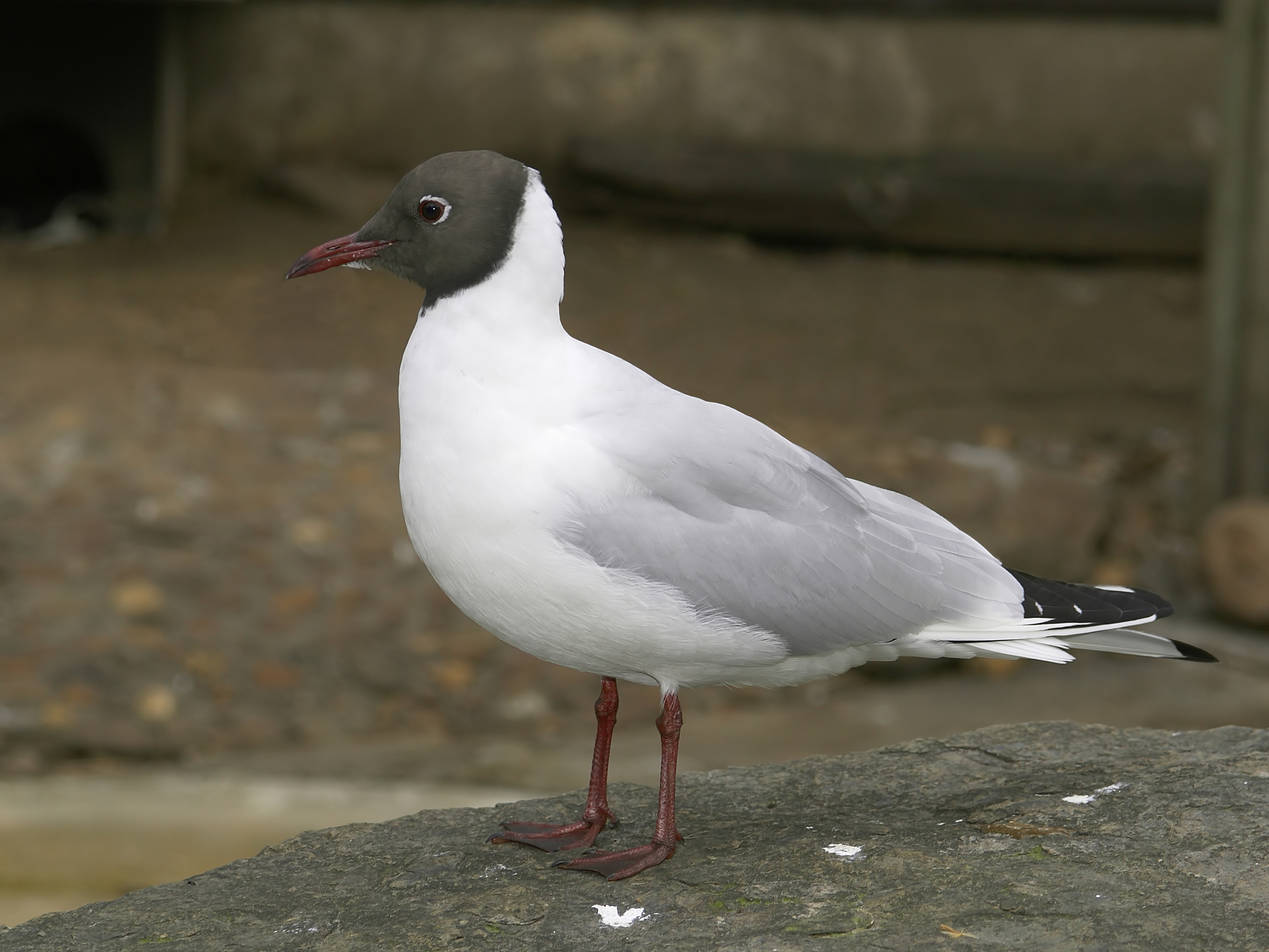
Kehaar is a black-headed gull (Chroicocephalus ridibundus; pictured with summer plumage).

- Kehaar: A black-headed gull who is forced, by an injured wing, to take refuge on Watership Down, and befriends the rabbits when they help him. He is characterised by his frequent impatience, guttural accent and unusual phrasing. After discovering the Efrafan warren and helping the rabbits, he re-joins his colony, but visits them often. According to Adams, Kehaar was based on a fighter from the Norwegian Resistance in World War II.
- The Mouse: Never named, the mouse is a resident of Watership Down before the arrival of the rabbits. While rabbits usually despise smaller mammals like rodents and shrews, and view them as untrustworthy, Hazel kindly saves the mouse from a kestrel. This action allies the mice and rabbits on Watership Down, and the same mouse later warns them of General Woundwort's intended surprise attack, thus saving many lives.
- Bob: The Nuthanger Farm Labrador who helps repel the Efrafans from Watership Down.

=== Mythical characters ===
- Frith: The primary deity in rabbit folklore, similar to the God of Abraham, said to have created the world. While forced to create elil (predators) because of the rabbits' refusal to stop overpopulating the Earth, Frith promised that rabbits would never be allowed to go extinct. In Lapine, the word Frith means "the sun/sunrise".
- El-ahrairah: A rabbit trickster culture hero, who is the protagonist of nearly all of the rabbits' stories. He is referred to as the rabbit equivalent of Robin Hood. He represents what every rabbit wants to be: Smart, devious, tricky, and devoted to the well-being of his warren. In Lapine, his name is a contraction of the phrase Elil-hrair-rah, which means "prince with a thousand enemies". His stories of cleverness (and excessive hubris) are similar to Br'er Rabbit and Anansi.
- Prince Rainbow: A lesser deity in rabbit folklore, tasked by Frith to organise the world. He often abuses his power to try to harm or rein in El-ahrairah and the rabbits, such as imprisoning them in an inhospitable marsh, but is always outsmarted.
- Rabscuttle: Another mythical folk hero, Rabscuttle is El-ahrairah's second-in-command and Owsla Captain. He participates in many of El-ahrairah's capers. He is considered to be almost as clever as his chief. His name may be a reference to a rabbit's "scut", or tail.
- Black Rabbit of Inlé: Known as Inlé-rah ("Prince/Chief of the Moon" or "Prince/Chief of the Dead") to his ghostly Owsla, he is a sombre phantom servant of the god Frith who appears in rabbit folklore as a kind of analogue to the grim reaper. His duty is to ensure all rabbits die at their predestined time, and he avenges any rabbit killed without his consent. Inlé is the Lapine term for the moon/moonrise, as well as the word for the Land of the Dead.

== Lapine language ==
"Lapine" is a fictional language created by author Richard Adams for the novel, where it is spoken by the rabbit characters. The language was again used in Adams's 1996 sequel, Tales from Watership Down, and has appeared in both the film and television adaptations. The language fragments in the books consist of a few dozen distinct words, used mainly for the naming of rabbits, their mythological characters, and objects in their world. The name "Lapine" comes from the French word for rabbit.

== Themes ==
Watership Down has been described as an allegory, with the labours of Hazel, Fiver, Bigwig, and Silver "mirror[ing] the timeless struggles between tyranny and freedom, reason and blind emotion, and the individual and the corporate state." Adams draws on classical heroic and quest themes from Homer and Virgil, creating a story with epic motifs.

=== The Hero, the Odyssey, and the Aeneid ===
The book explores the themes of exile, survival, heroism, leadership, political responsibility, and the "making of a hero and a community". Joan Bridgman's analysis of Adams's works in The Contemporary Review identifies the community and hero motifs: "[T]he hero's journey into a realm of terrors to bring back some boon to save himself and his people" is a powerful element in Adams's tale. This theme derives from the author's exposure to the works of mythologist Joseph Campbell, especially his study of comparative mythology, The Hero with a Thousand Faces (1949), and in particular, Campbell's "monomyth" theory, also based on Carl Jung's view of the unconscious mind, that "all the stories in the world are really one story."

The concept of the hero has invited comparisons between Watership Down's characters and those in Homer's Odyssey and Virgil's Aeneid. Hazel's courage, Bigwig's strength, Blackberry's ingenuity and craftiness, and Dandelion's and Bluebell's poetry and storytelling all have parallels in the epic poem Odyssey. Kenneth Kitchell declared, "Hazel stands in the tradition of Odysseus, Aeneas, and others". Tolkien scholar John Rateliff calls Adams's novel an Aeneid "what-if" book: what if the seer Cassandra (Fiver) had been believed and she and a company had fled Troy (Sandleford Warren) before its destruction? What if Hazel and his companions, like Odysseus, encounter a seductive home at Cowslip's Warren (Land of the Lotus Eaters)? Rateliff goes on to compare the rabbits' battle with Woundwort's Efrafans to Aeneas's fight with Turnus's Latins. "By basing his story on one of the most popular books of the Middle Ages and Renaissance, Adams taps into a very old myth: the flight from disaster, the heroic refugee in search of a new home, a story that was already over a thousand years old when Virgil told it in 19 BC."

=== Religious symbolism ===
When asked in a 2007 BBC Radio interview about the religious symbolism in the novel, Adams said the story was "nothing like that at all". He said the rabbits in Watership Down did not worship; however, "they believed passionately in El-ahrairah." Adams explained that he meant the book to be "only a made-up story ... in no sense an allegory or parable or any kind of political myth. I simply wrote down a story I told to my little girls." Instead, he explained, the "let-in" religious stories of El-ahrairah were meant more as legendary tales, similar to a rabbit Robin Hood, and these stories were interspersed throughout the book as humorous interjections to the often "grim" tales of the "real story".

== Reception ==
The Economist heralded the book's publication, saying "If there is no place for Watership Down in children's bookshops, then children's literature is dead." Peter Prescott, senior book reviewer at Newsweek, gave the novel a glowing review: "Adams handles his suspenseful narrative more dextrously than most authors who claim to write adventure novels, but his true achievement lies in the consistent, comprehensible and altogether enchanting civilisation that he has created." Kathleen J. Rothen and Beverly Langston identified the work as one that "subtly speaks to a child", with "engaging characters and fast-paced action [that] make it readable." This echoed Nicholas Tucker's praise for the story's suspense in the New Statesman: "Adams ... has bravely and successfully resurrected the big picaresque adventure story, with moments of such tension that the helplessly involved reader finds himself checking whether things are going to work out all right on the next page before daring to finish the preceding one."

D. Keith Mano, a science fiction writer and conservative social commentator writing in the National Review, declared that the novel was "pleasant enough, but it has about the same intellectual firepower as Dumbo." He pilloried it further: "Watership Down is an adventure story, no more than that: rather a swashbuckling crude one to boot. There are virtuous rabbits and bad rabbits: if that's allegory, Bonanza is an allegory."

John Rowe Townsend notes that the book quickly achieved such a high popularity despite the fact that it "came out at a high price and in an unattractive jacket from a publisher who had hardly been heard of." Fred Inglis, in his book The Promise of Happiness: Value and meaning in children's fiction, praises the author's use of prose to express the strangeness of ordinary human inventions from the rabbits' perspective.

Watership Down's universal motifs of liberation and self-determination have been identified with by readers from a diversity of backgrounds; the author Rachel Kadish, reflecting on her own superimposition of the founding of Israel onto Watership Down, has remarked "Turns out plenty of other people have seen their histories in that book ... some people see it as an allegory for struggles against the Cold War, fascism, extremism ... a protest against materialism, against the corporate state. Watership Down can be Ireland after the famine, Rwanda after the massacres." Kadish has praised both the fantasy genre and Watership Down for its "motifs [that] hit home in every culture ... all passersby are welcome to bring their own subplots and plug into the archetype."

=== Awards ===
Adams won the 1972 Carnegie Medal from the Library Association, recognising the year's best children's book by a British subject. He also won the annual Guardian Children's Fiction Prize, a similar award that authors may not win twice. (Note: Six books have won both awards in 45 years through 2011; alternatively, six authors have won the Carnegie Medal in Literature for their Guardian Prize-winning books. Professional librarians confer the Carnegie and select the winner from all British children's books. The Guardian newspaper's prize winner is selected by British children's writers, "peers" of the author who have not yet won it themselves, for one children's (age 7+) or young-adult fiction book. Details regarding the author and publisher nationality have varied.) In 1977 California schoolchildren selected it for the inaugural California Young Reader Medal in the Young Adult category, which annually honours one book from the last four years. In The Big Read, a 2003 survey of the British public, it was voted the forty-second greatest book of all time.

=== Criticism of gender roles ===
The 1993 Puffin Modern Classics edition of the novel contains an afterword by Nicholas Tucker, who wrote that stories such as Watership Down "now fit rather uneasily into the modern world of consideration of both sexes". He contrasted Hazel's sensitivity to Fiver with the "far more mechanical" attitude of the bucks towards the does portrayed as "little more than passive baby-factories".

In a 1974 New York Times Book Review essay "Male Chauvinist Rabbits", Selma G. Lanes alleges that the does are only "instruments of reproduction to save his male rabbits' triumph from becoming a hollow victory." Lanes argued that this view of female rabbits came from Adams rather than his source text, Ronald Lockley's The Private Life of the Rabbit in which the rabbit world is matriarchal, and new warrens are initiated by dissatisfied young females.

In similar vein, literary critic Jane Resh Thomas said Watership Down "draws upon ... an anti-feminist social tradition which, removed from the usual human context and imposed upon rabbits, is eerie in its clarity". Thomas also called it a "splendid story" in which "anti-feminist bias ... damages the novel in only a minor way".

Adams's 1996 sequel, Tales from Watership Down includes stories where the female rabbits play a more prominent role in the Watership Down warren.

=== Ownership controversy ===
On 27 May 2020, the high court in London ruled that Martin Rosen, the director of the 1978 film adaptation, had wrongly claimed that he owned all rights to the book, as well as terminating his contract for rights to the film. Rosen had entered into adaptation contracts worth more than $500,000 (£400,000), including licences for an audiobook adaptation and the 2018 television adaptation.

In his ruling, Judge Richard Hacon ordered Rosen to pay over $100,000 in damages for copyright infringement, unauthorised licence deals, and denying royalty payments to the Adams estate. Rosen was also directed to provide a record of all licence agreements involving Watership Down, and pay court costs and the Adams estate's legal fees totalling £28,000.

== Adaptations ==
=== Music ===
In the early 1970s Bo Hansson was introduced to the book by his girlfriend. This gave him an idea to create a new album in the same style as his Lord of the Rings album. In 1977 he released the all instrumental El-Ahrairah. The title was taken directly from the pages of Watership Down, with El-Ahrairah being the name of a trickster, folk-hero/deity rabbit, known as The Prince with a Thousand Enemies. In other countries the album was released as Music Inspired by Watership Down.

Between the years 2005 and 2009 the British anarchist crust band Fall of Efrafa from Brighton were active and wrote a three album concept trilogy inspired wholly by Watership Down: Owsla (2006), Elil (2007) and Inlé (2009). Their three album project named after the oppressive rabbit society of Efrafa, follows the novel's darker political themes and transforms them into intense, atmospheric music with a strong message against authoritarianism and oppression.

=== Film ===
In 1978 Martin Rosen wrote and directed an animated film adaptation of Watership Down. The voice cast included John Hurt, Richard Briers, Harry Andrews, Simon Cadell, Nigel Hawthorne, and Roy Kinnear. The film featured the song "Bright Eyes", sung by Art Garfunkel. Released as a single, the song became a UK number one hit although Richard Adams said that he hated it.

Although the essentials of the plot remained relatively unchanged, the film omitted several side plots. Though the Watership Down warren eventually grew to seventeen rabbits with the additions of Strawberry, Holly, Bluebell, and three hutch rabbits liberated from the farm, the movie includes a band of only eight. Rosen's adaptation was praised for "cutting through Adams' book ... to get to the beating heart".

The film has also seen some positive critical attention. In 1979 the film received a nomination for the Hugo Award for Best Dramatic Presentation. Additionally, British television station Channel 4's 2006 documentary 100 Greatest Cartoons named it the 86th greatest cartoon of all time. But, "lovable bunnies notwithstanding, younger children might be troubled by the more graphic scenes. Numerous rabbits die in bloody fights, while one gets choked by a snare and another is snatched by a bird of prey."

=== Television ===
From 1999 to 2001, the book was also adapted as an animated television series, broadcast on CITV in the UK and on YTV in Canada. Only the first two series were aired in the UK, while all three series were aired in Canada. It was produced by Martin Rosen and starred several well-known British actors, including Stephen Fry, Rik Mayall, Dawn French, John Hurt, and Richard Briers, running for a total of 39 episodes over three seasons. Although the story was broadly based on the novel and most characters and events retained, some of the story lines and characters (especially in later episodes) were entirely new. In 2003, the second season was nominated for a Gemini Award for Best Original Music Score for a Dramatic Series.

=== 2018 animated series ===
In July 2014, it was announced that the BBC would be airing a new animated series based on the book and in April 2016 that the series would be a co-production between the BBC and Netflix, consisting of four one-hour episodes, with a budget of £20 million. The four-episode serial premiered on the BBC and Netflix on 23 December 2018, with the voices of James McAvoy as Hazel, John Boyega as Bigwig, and Ben Kingsley as General Woundwort. It received generally positive reviews, with praise for the performances of its voice cast, but received criticism for its tone and the quality of the computer animation.

=== Theatre ===
In 2006, Watership Down was again adapted for the stage, this time by Rona Munro. It ran at the Lyric Hammersmith in London. Directed by Melly Still, the cast included Matthew Burgess, Joseph Traynor, and Richard Simons. The tone of the production was inspired by the tension of war: in an interview with The Guardian, Still commented, "The closest humans come to feeling like rabbits is under war conditions ... We've tried to capture that anxiety." A reviewer at The Times called the play "an exciting, often brutal tale of survival" and said that "even when it's a muddle, it's a glorious one."

In 2011, Watership Down was adapted for the Lifeline Theatre in Chicago by John Hildreth. This production was directed by Katie McLean Hainsworth and the cast included Scott T. Barsotti, Chris Daley, Paul S. Holmquist, and Mandy Walsh.

=== Musical ===
An original folk-musical adaptation of Watership Down was staged during the 2026 Minnesota Fringe Festival by local theatre company Melancholics Anonymous. The score and lyrics were composed by Bee Davis and the original text was co-adapted by Rachel Ropella and Timothy Kelly. The cast included Aerin O'Malley, Anneliese Garner, Bee Davis, Claire Chenoweth, Hawken Paul, Laura Marie, Meredith Enersen, Samantha Miller, and Timothy Kelly.

The show featured a 10-foot tall dog puppet and original songs featuring a cantareel for guitar were played by Mason Tacke, Bee Davis, and Hawken Paul. The adaptation won several Golden Lanyard Awards including Audience Pick, Venue Pick, and Artist Pick. The production was, "presented by special arrangement with Watership Down Enterprises Limited".

=== Role-playing game ===
Watership Down inspired the creation of Bunnies & Burrows, an early role-playing game in which the main characters are talking rabbits, published in 1976 by Fantasy Games Unlimited. It introduced several innovations to role-playing game design, being the first game to allow players to have non-humanoid roles, as well as the first with detailed martial arts and skill systems. Fantasy Games Unlimited published a second edition of the game in 1982, and the game was modified and republished by Steve Jackson Games as an official GURPS supplement in 1992.

=== Radio ===
In 2002, a two-part, two-hour dramatisation of Watership Down by Neville Teller was broadcast by BBC Radio 4.

In November 2016, a new two-part two-hour dramatisation, written by Brian Sibley, was broadcast on BBC Radio 4.

=== Audiobooks ===
In the 1970s, the book was released by Argo Records read by Roy Dotrice, with musical background—music by George Butterworth performed by Academy of St Martin in the Fields under the direction of Neville Marriner.

Alexander Scourby narrated an unabridged edition, originally published on LP in the 1970s by the Talking Books program of the American Foundation for the Blind (NLSB). The LPs have been destroyed by NLSB and are very rare.

In 1984, Watership Down was adapted into a four-cassette audiobook by John Maher in association with the Australian Broadcasting Company's Renaissance Players. Produced by John Hannaford and narrated by Kerry Francis, the audiobook was distributed by The Mind's Eye.

In 1990, a 16-hour, 11-cassette recording read by John MacDonald was published by Books on Tape, Inc. of Santa Ana, CA.

Andrew Sachs recorded a five and a half-hour abridged version of the story for Puffin Audiobooks.

In 2010, Audible.com released an unabridged digital download of the book, narrated by the multiple award-winning Ralph Cosham.

In 2019, Blackstone Audio Inc. released an unabridged version of Watership Down with a foreword by the author, Richard Adams. Peter Capaldi narrated the 17-hour, 31-minute book.

=== Graphic novel ===
A new graphic novel version of Watership Down was released in 2023, adapted by award-winning author James Sturm and illustrated by bestselling artist Joe Sutphin. The graphic novel was a nominee for the 2024 Harvey Award for Book of the Year.

== Parodies ==
In the American stop motion TV show Robot Chicken, a parody of the book is done with the Fraggles, the main characters of the 80s show Fraggle Rock, in place of the rabbits.

The November 1974 issue of National Lampoon magazine, released shortly after the resignation and pardon of President Richard Nixon, featured a satirical parody of the novel entitled "Watergate Down", written by Sean Kelly, in which rabbits are replaced by rats, described as animals with "the morals of a Democrat and the ethics of a Republican".

The Dropout Dungeons & Dragons series Dimension 20 has a side quest "Burrow's End" loosely based on Watership Down. The main characters are Stoats looking for a new warren to live in.

== See also ==
- Animal Farm
- The Animals of Farthing Wood
- Arrietty
- The Constant Rabbit
- Epic
- FernGully: The Last Rainforest
- Warriors

== Citations ==
Awards
Preceded by Josh	Carnegie Medal recipient 1972	Succeeded by The Ghost of Thomas Kempe
