= Watership Down (1999 TV series) =

Canadian-British television series

- The Watership Down title card for seasons 1–2. From left to right: Pipkin, Bigwig, Hazel, Blackberry, and Fiver.
- Genre: Animated series Fantasy; Children's television
- Based on: Watership Down by Richard Adams
- Written by: Mary Crawford; Alan Templeton
- Directed by: Troy Sullivan
- Opening theme: "Bright Eyes" (originally composed by Mike Batt) performed by Stephen Gately (Seasons 1-2); Season 3 Theme song
- Ending theme: "Bright Eyes" (reprise; Seasons 1-2); Thank You Stars (instrumental)
- Composer: Mike Batt
- Countries of origin: United Kingdom; Canada
- Original language: English
- No. of seasons: 3
- No. of episodes: 39

Production
- Executive producers: Simon Vaughan; Justin Bodle; Steven DeNure; Neil Court
- Producers: Simon Vaughan; Beth Stevenson
- Running time: 23 minutes
- Production companies: Decode Entertainment; Nepenthe Productions; Alltime Entertainment

Original release
- Network: YTV (Canada); CITV (United Kingdom)
- Release: 28 September 1999 – 4 December 2001

Watership Down is an animated adventure children's television series, adapted from the 1972 novel by Richard Adams. The second adaptation of the novel (after the 1978 film), it was produced by UK's Alltime Entertainment and Canada's Decode Entertainment in association with Martin Rosen (the director of the 1978 film), with the participation of the Canadian Television Fund, the Canadian Film or Video Production Tax Credit and the Ontario Film and Television Tax Credit from the Government of Ontario. The series stars several well-known British actors, including Stephen Fry, Rik Mayall, Phill Jupitus, Jane Horrocks, Dawn French, John Hurt and Richard Briers (the latter two also star in the film).

For the theme song, Stephen Gately performed a new arrangement of Art Garfunkel's "Bright Eyes" (included in the 1978 film). Mike Batt (who wrote "Bright Eyes") composed an all-new score performed by the Royal Philharmonic Orchestra. In 2003, composer Mike Batt was nominated for a Gemini Award for Best Original Music Score for a Dramatic Series for his work on the series.

Watership Down aired for three seasons from September 1999 to December 2001, on YTV in Canada. CITV in the UK aired only the first two seasons. 39 episodes were produced.

== Plot overview ==
Watership Down (with the use of the novel's basic plot) follows the lives of a group of rabbits as they leave their endangered warren in search of a safe new home. They travel across the English countryside, braving perilous danger, until they find a hill called Watership Down, where they begin a new warren. However, they are endangered by another warren, Efrafa, which is led by the authoritarian General Woundwort, and they are soon forced to defend their home and lives.

Although the series began with elements taken from the original novel, later episodes of the first series, as well as most of the second and third were almost entirely new content, with many episodes focusing solely on new characters and situations.

In addition, the third series featured a new opening sequence and somewhat altered style of animation, along with many of the original voice actors leaving, only leaving a handful of the original cast to remain. The programme became noticeably darker in tone, adding elements of mysticism and magic, and focusing on an evil new warren called Darkhaven.

Although the series was praised by younger audiences at the time of the series' air, fans of both the novel and the movie were more mixed about the series due to drastic changes from the novel (like Pipkin going from a grownup rabbit to a young rabbit and Blackberry changing from a buck to a doe) and its more child-friendly tone as compared to some of the violence of the movie.

== Voice cast ==
Watership Down has a cast of many familiar faces in British film and television. John Hurt, the voice of Hazel in the film, returns this time as the voice of General Woundwort in the first and second seasons, and Richard Briers, the voice of Fiver in the film, appears in the series as Captain Broom. Dawn French, Jane Horrocks, Stephen Fry, Phil Jupitus and Rik Mayall all provide voices, as Buttercup, Hannah, Cowslip, Dandelion and Kehaar respectively, in both the first and second seasons.

To a lesser extent, former Boyzone member Stephen Gately, who was responsible for performing a special re-working of "Bright Eyes", provides the voice of Blackavar in seasons 1 and 2, and comedy actor Stephen Mangan provides the voice of Bigwig and later, Silverweed, replacing Tim McInnerny who provided Silverweed's voice for one episode in Series 1. Actor Kiefer Sutherland was involved and voiced a new rabbit called Hickory, but only for 3 episodes, to be replaced in Series 3 by Rob Rackstraw who also provides the voice for Captain Campion.

By Series 3, most of the celebrity voices were reduced and were replaced by high-profile voice actors, with only a few of the original cast reprising their roles and providing additional voices.

=== All seasons ===
- Rob Rackstraw as Campion, Captain Holly, Hickory (season 3) Raincloud, Granite
- Stephen Mangan as Bigwig, Silverweed (season 3) Black Rabbit of Inle, Shale
- David Holt as Vervain, Bluesky, Boxwood, Darkling
- Andrew Falvey as Fiver, Flax, Feldspar
- Sue Elliot Nichols as Blackberry, Tabitha
- Lee Ross as Hawkbit

=== Seasons 1-2 only ===
- Ian Shaw as Hazel
- Elliot Henderson-Boyle as Pipkin
- Stephen Fry as Cowslip
- Stephen Gately as Blackavar
- Kiefer Sutherland as Hickory
- Kate Ashfield as Primrose
- Tim McInnerny as Silverweed
- Dawn French as Buttercup
- Stephanie Morgenstern as Marigold
- Anthony Barclay as Culoci
- Matt Wilkinson as Pedro the Weasel
- Phill Jupitus as Dandelion
- Jane Horrocks as Hannah
- Rik Mayall as Kehaar
- Tom Eastwood as Moss
- Joanna Ruiz as Clover
- Robert Harper as Strawberry
- Janet Dale as Bark, Tassle, Frost, Katrina
- Alice Welsh and Sean Welsh as Primrose's Bunnies

=== Season 3 only ===
- Maria Darling as Hannah, Pipkin, Clover
- Paul Panting as Strawberry, Flax
- Penny Freeman as Primrose, Marigold
- Nigel Pegram as Hazel, Moss, General Woundwort, Dandelion

These voices would also replace actors who left their roles from the first two seasons, but these roles are currently difficult for fans to identify who played which role, as season 3 credits only listed the actors' names and not the roles they played.

== Characters ==
=== Watership Down ===
- Hazel – The main protagonist of the series and Fiver's older brother. He leads the rabbits from Sandleford and eventually becomes Chief Rabbit of Watership Down. Although Hazel is not the strongest of the Watership Down rabbits, he is one of the most intelligent of the rabbits, and is also a charismatic leader who recognizes and employs the skills of his fellow rabbits to great success. He is shot while freeing a hutch rabbit at Nuthanger Farm and almost dies, but is saved by his younger brother Fiver. Although lamed by this injury, he leads the foray to Efrafa and comes up with the final, successful strategy to defeat General Woundwort. Hazel's mate is Primrose, whom he freed from Efrafa.
- Fiver – Hazel's younger brother. A shy and kind runty rabbit whose visions of the destruction of the Sandleford warren led him to leave, along with his older brother Hazel and several other rabbits. He appears to be more prescient than his novel counterpart, and his visions come in rhymes. He often feels responsible for foreseeing terrible things or blaming himself for their outcome. He and Hazel are very close.
- Bigwig – A former an officer of the Sandleford Owsla, so-called because of the large amount of hair surrounding his face, giving him the appearance of a lionhead rabbit. The largest and most powerful of the Sandleford survivors, he is often blunt and impatient for dangerous action and fighting. After nearly getting killed in a snare in episode 3, he realizes that Fiver is right more often than not. He quickly befriends Kehaar and often asks for his help on Hazel's behalf. Hazel often selects him for the most dangerous missions, such as the infiltration of Efrafa. Later, he becomes captain of Watership Down's Owsla and falls for Spartina, a doe from Darkhaven.
- Blackberry – While a male in the original novel and in the 1978 movie, in the TV series, Blackberry is a doe who is skilled with herbs and is referred to as the digging expert. As in the novel, she is the most intelligent of the rabbits, and often comes up with ingenious ideas. She is the only doe to go to Watership Down with Hazel and the others. Later in the series, she falls in love with Campion. She is devastated when she thinks Campion is dead, but is reunited with him when she is taken prisoner in Darkhaven. At the end of the series, she and Campion return to Watership Down together.
- Pipkin – A very young, adventurous rabbit eager to prove himself in the eyes of his bigger companions—particularly Hazel and Bigwig. He is the youngest of the Watership Down rabbits and has the gift of making friends with everyone, including other animals in the Down area, to the point that when he is in trouble they will immediately join with the Watership Down rabbits to come to his rescue. Even Woundwort found he was not immune to Pipkin's charm and refused to kill him, saying that it would be like killing a part of himself. During the last season Pipkin, grows up to be a responsible rabbit, even leading the "Junior Owsla".
- Dandelion: Dandelion is an accomplished storyteller. He is a joker and a wise guy and provides much of the series' comedy relief. He is a good friend of Hawkbit, despite their mutual attraction to former Efrafan doe Heather (who later leaves with Moss to start a new warren). He and Hawkbit serve in Bigwig's Owsla together.
- Hawkbit– A pessimistic, grouchy, and sarcastic rabbit who always has a biting comment for every situation, but is a dependable member of the warren whenever help is needed. He later becomes a good friend of the more cerebral Dandelion and during the last season, he settles down with Clover.
- Holly – The former captain of the Sandleford Owsla, Holly has only a minor role and is mostly used as a background character. He formed a key part of the Watership Down defenses in the last season.
- Clover – A former hutch rabbit rescued from Nuthanger Farm. She and Hawkbit settle down at the end of the series.
- Primrose – Born in Redstone, she was held captive in Efrafa until her rescue by the Watership Down rabbits. Primrose is very supportive of Hazel, who becomes her mate, and is also a dedicated mother to her three children, Snowdrop, Mallow and Gilia. She and Campion also have a strong bond, due to her being saved by him multiple times back in Efrafa. In Efrafa, she showed a rebellious and stubborn attitude toward Vervain, who bullied and tormented her at every given opportunity. Despite her deep hatred for Vervain, she, Fiver, Holly, and Broom saved his life when he was caught in some wire, although she originally protested the idea of helping the rabbit that "made her life miserable." Later, she hates herself for letting him go when she finds out he formed an alliance out of fear with Woundwort. Primrose replaces the character of Hyzenthlay from the novel and film.
- Blackavar – A captive in Efrafa with Primrose who was rescued by the Watership Down rabbits. Blackavar has only a minor role and is mostly used as a background character.
- Strawberry: An orange-brown rabbit who leaves Cowslip's warren after meeting Hazel and Bigwig and joins them in Watership Down. Initially lazy from his time with Cowslip, he later proves to be an accomplished digger and serves in Bigwig's Owsla.
- Broom – The former captain of the Redstone Owsla. When Primrose, now free from Efrafa, returns to see her old friends, Broom informs her that an unspecified illness has wiped out the entire warren but him. He joins the Watership Down rabbits at Hazel's invitation. He usually bores them with his tall tales, but does have wisdom (his knowledge about sheep helps avert a disaster) and can be relied upon in a crisis. He and Captain Holly also get along with each other.
- Campion: Woundwort's most trusted subordinate. Campion sees that Woundwort's leadership is destroying Efrafa, but is torn between his feelings for the free ways of Watership Down and his loyalty to his chief rabbit. He met Blackberry and it was love at first sight, but he sacrificed himself to save his chief from a cave in. He survived, albeit horribly scarred, and was taken to Darkhaven. He fought in the last battle against Woundwort. Afterwards, he and Blackberry settled down together.
- Silverweed – A seer with mental powers similar to Fiver, in particular possessing the power to see into another rabbit's mind by touch. He is traded to Woundwort to help him seek his destiny and was taken away from the Warren of the Shining Wires to Darkhaven, but later ends up on Watership Down and becomes a good friend of the rabbits there, even sacrificing most of his youth to help save the warren from Woundwort.
- Kehaar – A black-headed gull who is forced by an injured wing to take refuge on Watership Down. He is characterized by his frequent impatience, guttural accent and unusual phrasing. Eventually, after Hazel and the others befriend him, he flies over the countryside in an attempt to discover other warrens where the rabbits might find does to mate with. He discovers the Efrafan warren and after helping the rabbits he meets a gull called Gluck and flies to the city to settle down with her because she likes life in the city better.
- Hannah – A brown mouse who is a good friend of Kehaar, and has a love/hate relationship with Bigwig, who feels she is too small to be of any use in a fight, but her bravery more than makes up for her size. After Kehaar's departure, Hannah tries to learn magic to help her friends on the Down. Silverweed instead takes her magic into himself to save the Down. Although a mouse featured in the novel, it appeared only briefly, and spoke with a thick Italian accent.
- Snowdrop – A white kit, and one of Hazel and Primrose's three children.
- Mallow – A dark tan kit, and one of Hazel and Primrose's three children.
- Gilia – A tan kit, and one of Hazel and Primrose's three children.

=== Cowslip's Warren (Warren of the Shining Wires) ===
- Cowslip – The so-called leader of the warren, there is some doubt as to whether he is insane or totally evil. Hazel, Fiver, and Bigwig first encounter him when they accompany Holly to recover an injured Sandleford rabbit left there, only to learn the warren's terrible secret when Bigwig nearly becomes a victim and that the missing rabbit was a victim. He becomes angered by Hazel's warren when they help a group of his rabbits escape from his warren and even helps Woundwort to get his revenge on them. However, as he himself states, he is "a plotter, not a fighter" and he uses both sides for his own gain. Later he trades his seer, Silverweed, to Woundwort in exchange for the destruction of the warren of the rabbits who escaped him.

=== Efrafan Rabbits ===
- Woundwort – The main antagonist of the series. A brutal and tyrannical leader who sees himself as the one doing everything for the best of his warren, Woundwort strives to destroy Hazel and his 'outsiders' because of the hope for free life they represent for his own subjects. He is a huge, burly rabbit with black, ragged fur and a blinded left eye. He deeply respects Campion, even after his betrayal of him, and he often punishes and threatens Vervain, but still values him as an adviser and loyal subject despite this. He briefly shows a softer side after Pipkin tells him that his parents were killed by a weasel (a fate that Woundwort himself went through) and for a brief moment before Efrafa's destruction sees himself for what he is and what he has brought Efrafa to. After the destruction of Efrafa, Woundwort becomes obsessed with seeking his destiny of destruction, which leads him to the warren he was born in, Darkhaven. In the end, Woundwort is taken by the Black Rabbit of Inlé along with most of the Darkhaven rabbits.
- Moss: Moss is a military rabbit who becomes leader of the Efrafa rabbits after the battle with the rabbits of Watership Down.
- Vervain – A cowardly and sneaky rabbit, more adept at spying on others and threatening the weaker ones than in actual combat and is, next to Woundwort, the most hated and despised rabbit of the Watership Down story. Despite his shortcomings, Woundwort values him (although he does not openly show it) for his loyalty to him. Although Campion saved his life on more than one occasion, Vervain hates him with a passion and would like nothing better than to make Woundwort realize Campion is a traitor. Kehaar particularly dislikes Vervain and calls him an "ugly bunny." After Efrafa's destruction, Vervain tries to live on his own, but quickly loses hope until he is saved by Woundwort from a stoat. Although somewhat shocked by his master's increasing madness, Vervain continues to serve him, although more out of fear than loyalty and he secretly longs to lead a different life, even if such thoughts are futile. At the end, Vervain flees from the final battle and is not seen again.

=== Redstone Rabbits ===
- Hickory – The leader of Redstone Warren and the father of his kits. He and his mate, Marigold were soon joined by the Watership Down rabbits. He is somewhat naive.
- Marigold – Hickory's mate and the mother of her kits. She is more intelligent than her mate.

=== Nuthanger Farm ===
- Duster – The farm's dog who first appears in the first episode "The Promised Land" where he chases after the rabbits but fails in the process. He then has a small appearance in the episode "The Raid" where he barks at Hazel as he escapes from the barn. He also appeared in the episode "A Tale of a Mouse" in which he is guarding the farm's vegetables. At the end of the episode, he chases after the farm's cat, Tabitha. Duster's breed is possibly a Rottweiler.
- Tabitha – The farm's cat. She also first appears in the first episode "The Promised Land" where she attacks Kehaar when he is trying to steal her bowl of fish. She then had a larger role in two episodes, "The Raid" and "A Tale of a Mouse". In "The Raid", she tries to attack and eat Hazel, Fiver and Pipkin when they are trying to free the hutch rabbits but fails. In "A Tale of a Mouse", she goes after the rabbits again, and also after Hannah. At the end, she is chased by Duster around the farm. Tabitha appears again in "The Betrayal" when she attacks Spartina in a barn on Nuthanger Farm, and is driven off by Bigwig and the others. Tabitha's breed is possibly either a Tabby Cat or a Calico. Unlike Duster, she can speak (except her appearance in "The Promised Land").

=== Darkhaven Rabbits ===
- Spartina – One of Darkhaven's warrior does. She is chosen by Woundwort to trick the Watership Down rabbits into thinking that she is their friend, so she may spy on them and to find the location of their warren. However, while she is there, she begins to enjoy the peaceful life at Watership Down and develop feelings for Bigwig. Silverweed sees through her guise with his powers, and she confesses everything to Hazel and the others. She returns to Darkhaven in order to save Blackberry from being killed by Granite (under her orders), but she is soon taken prisoner alongside her due to a cunning trap laid by Vervain. However, she manages to escape along with Campion and Blackberry and aids the Watership Down rabbits in their fight against Woundwort. She settles down with Bigwig at Watership Down after the final battle.
- Granite – The chief of Darkhaven before losing his title to Campion during combat (which Campion later gave to Woundwort as soon as he arrived at Darkhaven). He is one of the warren's strongest rabbits. He is instructed by Spartina to kill Blackberry if Spartina did not return from Watership Down, but since Blackberry once saved his life, Granite is unable to perform the deed. When the Black Rabbit of Inlé is summoned by Silverweed, Granite flees for his life, leaving his fate unknown.
- Shale – A rabbit from Darkhaven who follows Woundwort's orders to destroy Watership Down. Campion first sees him in a vision before he is brought to Darkhaven. He appears to dislike Campion. In the final battle, he, along with Feldspar and most of the Darkhaven rabbits, were taken by the Black Rabbit of Inlé.
- Feldspar – A rabbit from Darkhaven who follows General Woundwort's orders to destroy Watership Down. He is always seen with Granite, Spartina, and Shale, and at one point offers to fight Vervain. In the final battle, he, along with Shale and most of the Darkhaven rabbits, is taken by the Black Rabbit of Inlé.
- Speaker of the Past – A rabbit who teaches other rabbits about Darkhaven and how it was made. When the law of trying to heal the weak is broken, she can't protect the student who violated it. During the last battle at Watership Down, her fate is left unknown.

== Episodes ==
=== Season 1 ===
| No. | Title | UK air date |
|---|---|---|
| 1 | "The Promised Land" | 28 September 1999 |
Seven rabbits from Sandleford Warren set out on a search for the 'High Lonely Hills,' which Fiver has seen in a vision as being a place of safety. Along the way, they encounter many dangers such as the river and a dog. They finally reach the hill called Watership Down.
| 2 | "Home on the Down" | 5 October 1999 |
The rabbits begin to settle into their new home on the down. However, problems become apparent: the burrows need digging, but there's only one doe and bucks don't dig! A weasel also arrives at the down and everyone must work together. Meanwhile, a mysterious visitor is looking for Bigwig, revealed to be Captain Holly, who escapes from Sandleford.
| 3 | "The Easy Life" | 12 October 1999 |
In search of Pimpernel, the rabbits travel to a nearby warren believed to be a place of safety. This warren led by Cowslip seems a little too good to be true ... and it is! Bigwig nearly dies in the process of realizing this.
| 4 | "Strawberry Fayre" | 19 October 1999 |
Free from Cowslip's warren, Strawberry begins to settle in at the down, albeit lazily. Meanwhile, Bigwig hears of a vicious warren called "Efrafa" and investigates further.
| 5 | "The Shadow of Efrafa" | 26 October 1999 |
Hazel, Fiver and Bigwig decide to visit Efrafa, after hearing reports that Efrafa want to kill all outsiders. Hazel encounters Woundwort and asks him a few questions, unaware that Woundwort is set upon killing him. Hazel falls in love with a doe named Primrose held captive in Efrafa. After Fiver has a vision about Woundwort's past (which is unlike any vision he has had before), they escape, having made a new enemy. Hazel promises himself he will come back for Primrose to free her.
| 6 | "The Raid" | 2 November 1999 |
Preoccupied with worries of Efrafa, Hazel travels to Nuthanger Farm with Pipkin and Fiver to get some hutch rabbits to come and join them, fearing that if they don't have enough rabbits living with them, they will be wiped out by Efrafa. Hazel ends up being shot in the leg and is separated from Fiver, Pipkin, and Clover, a hutch rabbit who escapes with them. Pipkin and Clover leave for Watership Down, while Fiver and Kehaar look for Hazel. They find him, but he is badly injured. Kehaar cleans his wound and they go back home.
| 7 | "The Challenge to Efrafa" | 9 November 1999 |
Hazel, Bigwig, Fiver, Hawkbit, and Blackberry all set off to help rescue Primrose and Blackavar from Efrafa. However, they get trapped under a stone bridge. Bigwig and Hazel have yet another argument and Bigwig storms off, forming a plan to rescue Blackavar and Primrose.
| 8 | "Escape from Efrafa" | 16 November 1999 |
Bigwig infiltrates Efrafa and plans to help Primrose and Blackavar escape. Hazel and the others are still stuck under the stone bridge with the Efrafan guards on top of it. They hatch a plan with Kehaar and flee towards the grounds of Efrafa to meet Bigwig, where he tells them his plan to free Primrose and Blackavar. After some time and bumping into Vervain unexpectedly, they finally flee from Efrafa and make their escape on a boat, leaving Woundwort raging as he cannot swim after the boat. Hazel and Primrose are happy to be together at last.
| 9 | "The Vision" | 23 November 1999 |
Primrose feels homesick for her former warren Redstone, so Hazel agrees to take her back despite Fiver telling them the place is empty. On the down, Fiver has another vision: that one of their past enemies will return (the weasel they defeated earlier that spring). Fiver begins to feel even guiltier than usual after Hawkbit accuses him of being bad luck (despite the fact that if Fiver had never told them about the visions they'd all be dead by now); however, Hawkbit was just angry at Bigwig for working them too hard. Meanwhile, Hazel and Primrose travel towards Redstone. Primrose nearly drowns after falling into the river along the way, but Hazel leaps in and rescues her. They are shocked to find that Fiver was right about Redstone being empty. The only one left there is Captain Broom, the warren's sole survivor of an unspecified sickness. Along with Broom, they go back to the Down and tell Fiver that his visions aren't wrong, and Fiver feels much better.
| 10 | "A Tale of a Mouse" | 30 November 1999 |
Hazel decides to take a trip to the farm with Bigwig, Fiver, and Hawkbit to find some good food for the new baby rabbits. Everything seems to be going well until they encounter a dog and cat. Fiver is trapped by the cat, but the others rescue him by tricking the dog and cat into fighting each other.
| 11 | "Lost" | 7 December 1999 |
Wandering through the burrow, Hawkbit discovers a strange chamber and believes that he saw the Black Rabbit of Inlé. Concerned, Hawkbit goes to check it out again with Hazel and Fiver. They encounter a cave-in and are trapped, but Bigwig believes Hazel, Fiver, and Hawkbit have been kidnapped by Efrafa. The cave Hazel, Fiver, and Hawkbit fall into is revealed to be a secret tunnel that goes all the way to Efrafa, and Bigwig uses it to escape a Wide Patrol. Later, the others found out the Black Rabbit is just a shadow.
| 12 | "Friend and Enemy" | 14 December 1999 |
Certain that the Efrafans are getting closer to Watership Down, Hazel and his friends decide to leave false trails leading them away from the warren. Meanwhile, Campion is attacked and seriously injured by a hawk. Hazel, being very compassionate, helps him into the greenhouse, but puts his own life in danger when they both meet an enemy neither of them have ever encountered before: a snake.
| 13 | "Kidnapped" | 21 December 1999 |
Bigwig and Hazel worry about the thought of Watership Down being wiped out and that they have no idea of Woundwort's plans. Deciding that they will try to get Campion on their side, they find him out on patrol and ask him to help. Campion agrees to help them, but Pipkin falls into the river and is swept away. Pipkin is captured by Vervain and held hostage in Efrafa.

=== Season 2 ===
| No. | Title | UK air date |
|---|---|---|
| 14 | "Prisoner of Efrafa" | 3 August 2000 |
The rabbits find out the Efrafans have captured Pipkin. Woundwort begins to treat Pipkin well in order to manipulate him into revealing the location of his warren. Woundwort also learns that Pipkin's mother was killed by a weasel (which was what happened to his own mother) and begins to develop a soft spot for the youngster. Meanwhile, Hazel hatches a plan to free Pipkin with help from Campion. They recruit as many of the local animals as they can in order to make their plan work, and in the end they rescue Pipkin.
| 15 | "The Roundabout" | 10 August 2000 |
Hickory and Marigold decide to escape Cowslip's warren and set off to find Hazel. He agrees to help them escape, and Hawkbit and Dandelion give them lessons on how to live outside in freedom. Hickory and Marigold decide to start a new warren, and Primrose suggests that they move into Redstone. Trouble starts when Hickory makes a rash mistake and gets trapped on a roundabout. Hazel and others set off to save him, and Pipkin helps Hickory across the road with the assistance of some geese.
| 16 | "The Market" | 17 August 2000 |
Kehaar becomes homesick for the Big Water and decides he must go and visit it. The rabbits tag along too and wander inside a big farm truck to nibble at the food. However, the truck drives off with the rabbits in it, and they find themselves at a market where Dandelion and Hawkbit get separated. Eventually, they find the others and make a strange friendship with a pig that they encourage to be free.
| 17 | "The Great Water" | 24 August 2000 |
Finally making it to the Big Water, the rabbits lose contact with Kehaar. They are amazed by their new surroundings, including the salty sea water, but soon realize that they are stuck on a rock ledge as the tide is rising. Meanwhile, Kehaar meets up with his old girlfriend, Katerina, but soon realizes she isn't as friendly as he once thought she was. Kehaar protects some puffins from Katerina, and in return the puffins help rescue the rabbits from the tide. Once they are all safe, they decide to head home.
| 18 | "The Stand" | 31 August 2000 |
Hickory and Marigold finally make their escape from Cowslip's warren, bringing some friends with them. Bigwig and his friends help Hickory set up the warren at Redstone, unaware that Cowslip has been watching them them. Cowslip goes to Efrafa and tells Woundwort about Redstone in order to get revenge on the defectors. Campion warns Hazel that Woundwort will attack Redstone at dawn, and Hazel is able to evacuate Redstone. Woundwort is disappointed to find the warren empty and heads off to Cowslip's warren to kill him, where he is unaware of the shining wire until Campion saves him. Campion, however, is caught out by Vervain and arrested. Fiver has a vision that someone will die, and Primrose worries that it will be Campion.
| 19 | "The Orchard" | 7 September 2000 |
Hazel and Bigwig go down to eat apples at a nearby orchard, but retreat back to the warren when they find out a badger lives there. Knowing that the orchard is off-limits, Pipkin persuades Fiver to go down with him to have a bite of the apples anyway. The badger appears, and Fiver and Pipkin flee, but Fiver gets hurt after he is hit by a ladder and Pipkin leaves him. The badger drags the unconscious Fiver into its den. Pipkin, thinking Fiver is dead, is haunted by guilt, but Fiver soon finds out the badger is harmless and her name is Bark.
| 20 | "The Great Game" | 14 September 2000 |
Hazel sends Hannah to check on Campion when he doesn't receive any news from him. The mouse sneaks into Efrafa and observes Vervain trying to coerce answers out of a starved Campion; she then reports back to Hazel. Knowing Campion is still under arrest and Vervain is starving him to death, Hazel decides he must do something to help. The rabbits make a cunning plan and convince Woundwort that Vervain is insane. Woundwort tells Campion that he is sorry for listening to Vervain and reappoints him as captain; meanwhile, Vervain is relieved of his duty and treated as insane. Campion is soon up and running again, but he turns down Hazel and Primrose's invitation to live at Watership Down.
| 21 | "Winter on Watership Down: Part 1" | 21 September 2000 |
It's been snowing and the grass has turned white. The rabbits plan on having a big feast, but with no food, Hazel, Bigwig, Hawkbit, Dandelion, Fiver, and Kehaar set off to find some. They become lost and encounter danger with a fox and ice. Bigwig falls through the ice and Hazel saves him, but Bigwig starts to suffer from the cold. They go to a mansion and stand outside, gazing in at the humans celebrating Christmas Eve. A strange rabbit named Buttercup comes along and allows the rabbits to stay at her warren, right near man. Kehaar, unable to find them, thinks that they have been eaten by the fox and becomes very upset.
| 22 | "Winter on Watership Down: Part 2" | 28 September 2000 |
After finding out Buttercup and her friends live near man, Hazel's group is unconvinced that Buttercup's warren is safe. Hazel and his friends decide to flee from there during the night, but they soon find out that Buttercup's warren truly is harmless and that the men that live nearby are harmless too. Buttercup lets them take as much food as they want, and Kehaar leads them back home safely to Watership Down. Primrose and others are happy that they finally came home at last.
| 23 | "The Mysterious Visitors" | 5 October 2000 |
Hawkbit, Fiver, Pipkin, and Dandelion raid the farm and, to Hazel's surprise, bring two other rabbits, Bluesky and Raincloud, back to the down instead of food. The strangers say they are messengers from Prince Rainbow. Hazel catches on straight away that it's all a scam, but he keeps it quiet. The two demanding rabbits tell Pipkin they can fly, which leads into a lot of trouble.
| 24 | "The Invasion" | 12 October 2000 |
After a huge storm, the rabbits are surprised that sheep have come to Watership Down. For now, Hazel agrees to let them stay. Pipkin befriends a lamb named Frost. But after living with them for a while, Hazel soon finds out that the sheep aren't that friendly. Their eating habits are ruining the down, and they attract more enemies. Broom explains about what a sheepdog can do to get rid of the sheep and Hazel hatches a cunning plan to get the sheep off the down.
| 25 | "Bigwig's Way" | 19 October 2000 |
Bigwig sets up an early morning Owsla patrol, but Hannah doesn't show up for her training. Later, she turns up with Hickory, excited that he and Marigold have baby rabbits. However, Bigwig is annoyed at her, and after an argument, Hannah leaves the down. Kehaar convinces Hannah to come to Redstone and she agrees. On her way to Redstone, she falls off of Kehaar's back and ends up stranded up a tree, where she meets a squirrel called Tassel, who shows her how to climb down the tree. Bigwig realizes that he's been too hard on Hannah and goes to find her to say sorry for what he had done.
| 26 | "The Homecoming" | 26 October 2000 |
Vervain is now a slave but escapes, manages to find the hidden back entrance to Hazel's warren, and tells Woundwort, much to Campion's horror. Campion sets off to warn Hazel and is then amazed by the beauty of Watership Down when he sees it for himself. Hazel and his friends set traps for Woundwort's arrival. It's love at first sight for Blackberry and Campion. Woundwort leads his troops into battle, and Fiver's scary vision becomes reality when Campion is crushed beneath a rock in the process of saving Woundwort. Hazel and others bid farewell to Campion in their hearts.

=== Season 3 ===
• Season 3 Episode Titles Error Because the only countries in Europe which aired the third TV series were Germany and Greece, the fan site Thank U Stars provided translations of each episode title directly from the German titles. However sites like play.com and tv.com have found and used the German translated titles and the unofficial ones found on the DVD releases or on screen as they appear at the beginning of each episode, mostly because this season also aired in North America.

| No. | Title | T=English-German Translated Title | Canadian air date |
|---|---|---|---|
| 27 | "The Last Battle" | Campion Lives | 11 September 2001 |
The Efrafan Owsla flees the collapsing caverns leaving only General Woundwort, Vervain, Moss, and a handful of soldiers alive. Realizing that not even the cave-in will stop Woundwort from trying to destroy them, Hazel, Fiver, and Bigwig make preparations to wage war on Efrafa with Pipkin recruiting all his animal friends. Fiver, meanwhile, senses that Campion is not dead, and indeed the former Efrafan captain manages to pull himself free from the rubble in the caverns, alive but horribly scarred. He meets the Black Rabbit of Inlé, who tells him his time has not yet come, and that he has a special destiny in store for him. Meanwhile, Moss seeing that Woundwort is going mad, teams up with a doe named Heather to overthrow him, but then the Watership group attacks Efrafa in full force. The Efrafans are free from Woundwort at last, though Efrafa itself is destroyed.
| 28 | "A New World" | Woundwort Never Gives Up | 18 September 2001 |
Following the liberation (and destruction) of Efrafa, the Efrafans move into Watership Down with Moss, the highest-ranking surviving officer, as their reluctant leader. Tensions are high as the different rabbit cultures clash, culminating in three surviving officers trying to bully Pipkin and ending up getting into a fight with Bigwig. Pipkin sulks, but when another animal tells him that the crows are waiting for someone to die, he runs off and discovers a badly wounded Campion. However, Campion makes him swear to keep his survival a secret. Meanwhile, Woundwort has survived and runs into two other former Efrafans in a swamp, letting them sink to their deaths in a mire after they refuse to swear loyalty to him. The Black Rabbit of Inlé shows Campion that Woundwort is alive and tells him that his destiny is to stop Woundwort, who "threatens the world of the living." Campion also has a horrible dream of Blackberry in danger in a strange new place. Meanwhile, Moss and Heather decide to take the rest of the Efrafans to start a new warren elsewhere.
| 29 | "The Wanderer" | The Wanderer | 25 September 2001 |
Vervain wanders about aimlessly, getting into all sorts of trouble. Bigwig, meanwhile, continues to push his Owsla. Campion, with Pipkin's help, is also beginning to regain his strength. Vervain meets a companion, only to abandon him like he always does after a weasel attacks them. In the end, Bigwig eventually accomplishes his goals. Vervain nearly drowns after he is entangled in a barbed wire filled pond, but Fiver, Primrose, Holly, Broom, Hannah, and Kehaar rescue him (but only after Fiver pleads with them to save the drowning rabbit). Primrose, who was the most reluctant to save him, banishes him. Fiver has a vision and the others realize that Woundwort lives. Meanwhile, Vervain is attacked by a weasel, but Woundwort saves him. Stunned, he once again pledges his loyalty to the General.
| 30 | "The Nestling" | The Challenge | 2 October 2001 |
The Junior Owsla and Kehaar help an orphaned hawk named Scree survive, while at the same time trying to prove to Hazel they are responsible enough to go on solo patrol. What they don't know is that Bigwig has been secretly watching them help the hawk, so when they actually ending up saving the hawk, they have proven themselves to him. Kehaar, having developed a fatherly bond with Scree, leaves to find a mate. Woundwort and Vervain realize that someone is following them, so they set a trap. Scree saves the trapped Campion.
| 31 | "The Secret of Redstone" | Woundwort In A Trap | 9 October 2001 |
Hazel and the others notice a change in Redstone, which has been plagued by elil, man, and pesticides. As they leave Redstone, they smell Campion's trail and believe it to be a ghost. Afraid, they split up, but Pipkin confesses the truth to Blackberry, who runs off to find Campion. He then confesses to the others. Woundwort, calling himself Wheatstalk and Vervain Chaff, begins to gain the trust of the rabbits at Redstone Warren. Blackberry finds Campion and tells him she loves him regardless of his scars, but he tells her he cannot be with her and runs off. Woundwort and Vervain get caught by a poacher, but the poacher is caught by a policeman before he can do anything and they are set free.
| 32 | "My Fair Gull" | Kehaar's Departure | 16 October 2001 |
Woundwort works his way towards chieftainship of Redstone. Kehaar returns with his new love, Gluck. All the rabbits are driven crazy by her. Woundwort discovers that it's Fiver who outsmarts him every time he has threatened Watership Down and decides he will have to kill the rabbit. Hickory makes Woundwort the new chief of Redstone, much to Marigold's horror (as she is the only one who has seen through the evil buck's disguise). After hearing about a rabbit called Silverweed, Vervain asks Hickory about him. Hickory says Silverweed is a strange mystical rabbit, and Vervain finds the information useful and passes it on to Woundwort. They decide to turn in the Redstone rabbits to Cowslip in exchange for Silverweed, an idea that Marigold overhears and flees to ask help from Hazel. She is nearly caught, but fakes her death after running in front of a car. Meanwhile, Kehaar decides to leave the warren for good with his new mate Gluck.
| 33 | "The Dark Deal" | Redstone Falls | 23 October 2001 |
Woundwort discovers that a human construction crew plans to bulldoze Redstone, so he and Vervain travel to the Warren of the Shining Wire. There, he tells Cowslip he will show him Redstone destroyed if Cowslip will give him his seer, Silverweed. Meanwhile, Hickory and Flax talk of revolt against "Wheatstalk," while Marigold races to Watership Down to warn Hazel and the others of Woundwort's return. They all race back, saving the rabbits just in time as Redstone is bulldozed. The wandering Campion stumbles across a new warren, Darkhaven, populated by savage rabbits who await the prophesied return of "the Dark One." He becomes their chief after he defeats their strongest warrior, Granite, winning the respect of a tough doe named Spartina.
| 34 | "Darkhaven" | The Magic | 30 October 2001 |
Woundwort, Vervain, and Silverweed arrive at Darkhaven, just in time to meet up with Campion. At the same time, Hannah goes off to meet up with the hedge wizard in order to learn magic so she can help her friends. Woundwort and Campion agree to join forces once more, while Vervain doubts that Campion can be trusted. Silverweed tries to look into Campion's heart, but he cannot because of the Black Rabbit of Inlé's curse. Woundwort feels empathy for the scarred rabbit and accepts him, despite Vervain's displeasure. Blackberry and Primrose head towards Darkhaven. Primrose escapes, but Blackberry is captured.
| 35 | "The Eyes of Silverweed" | An Unfair Duel | 6 November 2001 |
Silverweed traps Fiver in a twisted dreamworld illusion, allowing him to invade Fiver's mind and see through his eyes to learn the location of Watership Down for his master Woundwort. Fiver manages to fight off Silverweed's hold, but not before Silverweed deduces that Watership Down is "in the high hills, near a lone beech tree." Hazel realizes how dangerous Silverweed is, so he and the others journey to Darkhaven with the intent of kidnapping him. Meanwhile, Campion and Blackberry have the same idea, whilst Granite becomes Woundwort's new second-in-command when he challenges Vervain to single combat. Vervain forfeits rather than face the stronger Granite and then gets his position back by cheating. Fiver gets inside Silverweed's head and the mystic decides to go with Hazel to Watership Down. Silverweed is happy to be free at last.
| 36 | "The Spy" | The Spy | 13 November 2001 |
Bigwig uses Silverweed's influence to turn Hawkbit and Dandelion's original ideas against them when they attempt to slack off. Spartina is sent by Woundwort to befriend Hazel and the others and act as a spy for him. She tells Granite that if she does not return to Darkhaven by the next full moon, Granite is to kill Blackberry. Spartina fakes injury in order to be taken in by the Watership Down rabbits. However, Silverweed soon learns of her real objective. Blackberry is chased by Granite, but he gets injured and she helps him. Since healing is against Darkhaven law, Vervain uses this an excuse to arrest her, but Campion interferes and saves her from execution. Spartina is enraptured with Watership Down. She doesn't know what to do after having seen it with her own two eyes and falling in love with Bigwig.
| 37 | "The Betrayal" | Campion's Betrayal | 20 November 2001 |
Spartina soon gets found out by the other Watership Down rabbits and she confesses everything, even admitting to putting Blackberry in danger. Silverweed allows Bigwig to see into Spartina's heart, but Bigwig is frightened by her feelings for him and runs off. Granite attempts to help Campion and Blackberry escape out of gratitude to Blackberry, but they are caught by Woundwort and Vervain. Silverweed sees a vision involving Hannah's future, but refuses to admit what he sees. After Vervain reveals Spartina's betrayal, Woundwort uses her and Blackberry to make Campion confess where Watership Down is and to lead his army into battle there. Fiver has a vision, and Hazel knows the time has come to stop the enemy once and for all.
| 38 | "The Beginning of the End" | Hannah's Big Achievement | 27 November 2001 |
The Watership Down rabbits prepare for the last battle with Woundwort, once again gathering their animal friends to aid them and setting up traps around the warren. Scree takes Kehaar's place as the sky watch while Blackberry, Spartina, and Campion plan their escape from Woundwort.
| 39 | "The Magic" | The Last Battle | 4 December 2001 |
It's time to end the war once and for all. Both sides collide and there can be only one winner. After the first attack, both sides are injured and weakened, but they must keep fighting. Hazel tells them he'll stay and fight while the others escape to a new warren, but the warren refuses to leave their leader. Bigwig goes one on one with Woundwort, though is seriously injured. Hannah plans to use 'the magic' to finally be rid of Woundwort forever, but Silverweed knows that a high price must be made to use it, so he pays the price instead. Watership Down is saved at last.

=== Compilation Features ===
Three compilation features entitled Journey to Watership Down, Winter on Watership Down, and Escape to Watership Down, were produced. They were made up of multi-part episodes from the first two seasons and have been released on VHS and DVD, depending on the region.

=== Unproduced episode ===
According to the official Watership Down TV series website (which is now closed) Season 2 was supposed to have an episode produced called Dandelion's Big Story, in which he would tell a story to the younger rabbits, with the roles of El-ahrairah, Prince Rainbow, etc. played by the Watership Down rabbits, while Hazel and Bigwig went to Nuthanger Farm on a raid. However, the episode was never produced and was instead replaced by Bigwig's Way. Even so, the episode title and synopsis managed to find its way on to the 14-disc Region 2 DVD set by Universal Pictures/Right Entertainment, where it replaced Bigwig's Way. As the penultimate season 2 episode it was oddly placed within the DVD set; it is to be found on disc 10 preceding episodes from season 3 The Nestling and The Secret of Redstone.

== Soundtrack ==
The official soundtrack for the series was produced by Mike Batt with the aid of the Royal Philharmonic Orchestra. He had also gathered an array of stars to provide their voices for some of the songs. As well as Stephen Gately performing Bright Eyes, Art Garfunkel who had sung Bright Eyes for the film sang When You're Losing Your Way In The Rain, Cerys Matthews from the group Catatonia performed Thank You, Stars which was used in the series as a romance theme for Hazel and Primrose and Paul Carrack from the group Mike + The Mechanics performed Winter Song, though the song wasn't used, an instrumental piece was in the Winter on Watership Down two parter. Mike himself sang for the soundtrack, performing the song The View from a Hill which oddly enough was used in the series, but only in the German version and sung by an uncredited singer, and British voice actor Gary Martin provided the narration for the story of Frith's Blessing for the original release of the CD soundtrack, though in the TV series, it was Dandelion who told the tale of Frith's Blessing. Andrew Lloyd Webber composed a song called Fields of Sun for the soundtrack. Although this song was neither used in the show nor made available on the official soundtrack, he was still credited for the song's creation during the opening credits.

The soundtrack was re-released as part of the Mike Batt Music Cube in December 2009 by Dramatico Records. However, only the orchestral pieces are on the CD and none of the recorded songs are present. The re-released soundtrack has recently become available separately from the Cube in a 2-CD set, along with the soundtrack to the film Caravans.

Currently, the music cube re-released version of the soundtrack is also available to download in Mp3 format from Amazon's UK website.

== Home media releases ==
=== United Kingdom ===
In 1999 and 2000, three VHS tapes containing episodes of the first and second series were released by Buena Vista Home Entertainment - "Winter on Watership Down", released on 31 October 1999, "Journey to Watership Down", released on 31 March 2000, and "Escape from Efraia", released later on in the year. They were also released through a mail-order subscription with Reader's Digest.

By 2002, Entertainment Rights acquired the home video rights to the series in the UK and released the series through their Right Entertainment division, with Universal Pictures Video distributing. The company first released the series on a two-VHS box set on 6 May 2002, titled "The Promised Land", containing the first six episodes of Series 1, split into two tapes.

On 16 August 2004, Volume 1 "The Promised Land" and Volume 2 "The Strawberry Fayre" were released on DVD, and was followed by a re-release of the VHS volumes as separate releases on 8 November 2004. On 7 February 2005, Volume 3 "A Tale of a Mouse" was released on VHS and DVD containing Episodes 9-11 of Series 1. They were all re-released as a triple VHS/DVD set on 4 April 2005, which also saw the release of Volume 4 "The Prisoner of Efrafa" on DVD, containing Episodes 12-13 of Series 1 and Episode 1 of Series 2. The last numbered volume - Volume 5 "The Great Water", was released on 1 August 2005, and contains Episodes 2-4 of Series 2.

In October 2005, Right released a boxset containing all three seasons. This was later re-released by Universal, who also re-released the tripleset on 18 March 2013.

=== United States ===
The series was released on VHS and DVD in the United States by GoodTimes Entertainment and Reader's Digest Video. However, despite that, there has never been any proof showing that the show aired in the US, leading to the point where it was concluded that it didn't air in the US.

=== Australia ===
In Australia, Umbrella Entertainment released the series on DVD.

== Notes ==
- Bigwig's motto for the owsla is "Who Dares Wins", the motto of the SAS. The phrase was also used as an epigraph for the first story in Tales from Watership Down.
