= Tales from Watership Down =

1996 collection of short stories by Richard Adams

- First edition
- Author: Richard Adams
- Illustrator: John Lawrence
- Language: English
- Genre: Fantasy; Children's literature
- Publisher: Hutchinson (UK)
- Publication date: 1996
- Publication place: United Kingdom
- Media type: Print (hardback & paperback)
- Pages: 198pp
- ISBN: 0-09-180166-4
- Preceded by: Watership Down

Tales from Watership Down is a collection of 19 short stories by Richard Adams, published in 1996 as a follow-up to Adams's highly successful 1972 novel about rabbits, Watership Down. It consists of a number of short stories of rabbit mythology, followed by several chapters featuring many of the characters introduced in the earlier book. Like its predecessor, Tales from Watership Down features epigraphs at the beginning of each chapter and a Lapine glossary.

== Overview ==
Tales from Watership Down is in three parts: the first consists of five traditional tales of El-ahrairah and two more modern rabbit stories, the second contains four episodes recounting events that befell El-ahrairah and Rabscuttle on their return from visiting the Black Rabbit of Inlé, and the third contains eight chapters dealing with the Watership warren in the months following the events of the original book.

New characters are introduced, such as: Flyairth, a doe who threatens to undermine the stability of Watership Down; Sandwort, a disrespectful young buck who eventually changes his ways; Coltsfoot, a depressed buck whom Fiver befriends; Stonecrop, an escaped hutch rabbit; and Nyreem, an Efrafan doe with an injured leg. Although most of the characters from Watership Down retain their roles, Hyzenthlay, a doe, rises to the position of Co-Chief Rabbit with her mate, Hazel.

== Literary significance and reception ==
A reviewer for The New York Times wrote that while it was a "lighthearted companion piece" to Watership Down, it was "a little disjointed as a stand-alone volume". The book was praised by a reviewer at Salon, who wrote: "The pure, unfamiliar feelings evoked in 'The Story of the Three Cows' and in the gory 'The Hole in the Sky'—just two of the stories here—persist for quite a while after you've finished reading them".
