= Martin Rosen (director) =

American filmmaker and theater producer (born 1936)

- Born: Martin Gerald Rosen; August 31, 1936 (age 89); New York City, New York, U.S.
- Citizenship: United States; United Kingdom
- Occupations: Producer, film director, screenwriter, theatre producer
- Years active: 1968–2001, 2018

Martin Gerald Rosen (born August 31, 1936) is an American-British filmmaker and theater producer. He directed the animated film adaptations of Watership Down (1978) and The Plague Dogs (1982), both from the Richard Adams novels.

== Career ==
Rosen originally worked as a literary agent before he moved with his wife to the United Kingdom.

He first produced the Canadian feature A Great Big Thing (1968) and later co-produced Ken Russell's film version of Women in Love (1969), which won Academy Awards for Glenda Jackson and Billy Williams.

Rosen was originally the producer of Watership Down but took over as director after John Hubley, the original director, left after disagreements with Rosen. He also wrote the screenplay for it. This was the first of two novels by Richard Adams he adapted. In 1982 he also produced, directed and wrote the screenplay for another animated feature based on an Adams novel, The Plague Dogs (1982). Rosen produced Smooth Talk (1986), which won the Sundance Grand Prize. His last film as director was Stacking (1987). His last project as producer was the animated Watership Down TV series in 1999.

Rosen has also worked in theater production. He was the originating producer of Michael Weller's Moonchildren, first presented at London's Royal Court Theater before transferring to the US. He was the originating producer of Maxine Hong Kingston's "The Woman Warrior", presented in association with The Berkeley Rep, Boston's Huntington Theater, and the Doolittle Theater in Los Angeles.

== Watership Down ownership controversy ==
On 27 May 2020, the Intellectual Property Enterprise Court in London ruled that Rosen had wrongly claimed all rights to the book Watership Down, and terminated the contract which had given him rights to the film. He had entered into adaptation contracts worth more than $500,000 (£400,000), including licenses for an audiobook adaptation and the 2018 television adaptation.

In his ruling, Judge Richard Hacon ordered Rosen to pay over $100,000 in damages for copyright infringement, unauthorised license deals, and denying royalty payments to the Adams estate. He was also directed to provide a record of all license agreements involving Watership Down and pay court costs and the Adams estate's legal fees totalling £28,000. Subsequent failure to comply with the terms of the UK judgement left Rosen in contempt of court and facing enforcement proceedings in Connecticut.

== Personal life ==
Rosen is married to Elisabeth Payne Rosen, an author and ordained deacon in the Episcopal Church. They reside in Ross, California.

== Credits ==
=== Films ===
Year	Title	Director	Producer	Writer	Other	Notes
1968	A Great Big Thing		Yes			
1969	Women in Love		Yes		Yes	Presenter
1978	Watership Down	Yes	Yes	Yes		Directorial debut
1982	The Plague Dogs	Yes	Yes	Yes		
1985	Smooth Talk		Yes			
1987	Stacking	Yes	Yes			

=== Television ===
Year	Title	Director	Producer	Notes
1999–2001	Watership Down		Yes	TV series, executive producer
2018	Watership Down		Yes	TV series, executive producer

=== Theater ===
- I, Frederick
- The Women Warrior
- China Men
- Hallam's War

== Critical reception ==
Film	Rotten Tomatoes	IMDb
Watership Down	79%	7.6/10
The Plague Dogs	70% (9 reviews)	7.7/10

== Awards and nominations ==
Year	Award	Category	Title	Result
1978	Gold Hugo	Best Feature	Watership Down	Nominated
1979	Hugo Award	Best Dramatic Presentation	Watership Down	Nominated
1986	Independent Spirit Awards	Best Feature	Smooth Talk	Nominated
2018	Daytime Emmy Awards	Outstanding Special Class Animated Program	Watership Down	Won
