= Watership Down (film) =

1978 British animated adventure-drama film

- British theatrical release poster
- Directed by: Martin Rosen
- Written by: Martin Rosen
- Based on: Watership Down by Richard Adams
- Produced by: Martin Rosen
- Starring: John Hurt; Richard Briers; Michael Graham Cox; Simon Cadell; Harry Andrews; Zero Mostel
- Narrated by: Michael Hordern
- Edited by: Terry Rawlings
- Music by: Angela Morley; Malcolm Williamson
- Production company: Nepenthe Productions
- Distributed by: Cinema International Corporation; Nepenthe Films
- Release dates: 14 October 1978 (Sweden); 19 October 1978 (United Kingdom)
- Running time: 102 minutes
- Country: United Kingdom
- Language: English
- Budget: $2.4 million
- Box office: $3.5 million (US and Canada distributor rentals)

Watership Down is a 1978 British animated adventure drama film, written, produced, and directed by Martin Rosen and based on the 1972 novel by Richard Adams. It features the voices of John Hurt, Richard Briers, Harry Andrews, Simon Cadell, Nigel Hawthorne, Roy Kinnear, and Zero Mostel in his final film role.

This feature length animation was financed by a consortium of British financial institutions and distributed by Cinema International Corporation in the United Kingdom. It was released on 19 October 1978 and was an immediate success, becoming the sixth-most popular film of 1979 at the UK box office.

== Plot ==
In Lapine mythology, the world was created by the god Frith. All animals were similar, living harmoniously as grass-eaters. The rabbits multiplied though, and their appetite led to a food shortage. Frith ordered the rabbit prince, El-Ahrairah, to control his people, but was scoffed at. In retaliation, the angered Frith gave special gifts to every animal, making some into predators to hunt the rabbits, humbling El-Ahrairah which caused him to play it safe and try to head underground. Satisfied that El-Ahrairah had learned his lesson, Frith gave rabbits the gifts of speed and cunning.

In the present, in a warren near Sandleford, a young rabbit seer named Fiver has an apocalyptic vision when he and his older brother Hazel come across a signboard; it says a residential development is coming but they cannot read it. The two beg the chief rabbit to order an evacuation; the chief dismisses them, and orders Captain Holly, the head of the warren's Owsla "police force", to attempt to stop those trying to leave. Hazel and Fiver manage to escape with six other rabbits named Bigwig, Blackberry, Pipkin, Dandelion, Silver, and Violet.

They journey through the woods, avoiding several dangerous situations, until Violet – the group's only doe – is killed by a hawk. During the journey, they meet a rabbit named Cowslip, who invites them to his warren, where a farmer leaves Cowslip's group ample vegetables. They are grateful, but Fiver leaves when he senses something unsettling in the atmosphere. Bigwig follows, berating Fiver for causing tension. When Bigwig is caught in a snare, his friends free him, and Fiver realises the farmer is protecting and feeding Cowslip's warren so that he can snare rabbits for his own meals.

The rabbits discover Nuthanger Farm, which contains a hutch of domesticated does. Before they can free the females, the farm cat and dog chase them away. Later, they are found by Holly, who recounts the destruction of Sandleford warren by humans as well as an encounter with vicious rabbits called the "Efrafans". Fiver finally finds the hill he envisioned, Watership Down, where the group settles with Hazel as their new chief.

The rabbits soon befriend a black-headed gull named Kehaar, injured by the farm cat, who flies out in search of does. That night, the rabbits return to Nuthanger Farm to attempt to free the does there, but as they escape, the farmers respond to the disturbance by trying to block them in, and Hazel is shot in the leg and collapses into a storm drain. Fiver follows a vision of the mythical Black Rabbit of Inlé to his injured brother. Kehaar returns and, while removing the lead shotgun pellets from Hazel's leg, reports of the many does at the overcrowded Efrafa warren. Holly describes it as a dangerous totalitarian state ruled by its tyrannical chief, General Woundwort, but Hazel feels they must go there. Bigwig infiltrates the warren and is made an Owsla officer by Woundwort. Bigwig recruits several potential escapees to his cause, including Blackavar and Hyzenthlay. With Kehaar's help, the escapees use a boat to float down the river. That night, Kehaar leaves for his homeland, but promises to return in the future.

Efrafan trackers eventually find Watership Down. Woundwort rejects Hazel's offer of peace, and demands that all deserters must be turned over or Watership Down will be wiped out. While the Watership rabbits barricade their warren, Fiver slips into a trance, in which he envisions a dog running loose in the woods. This gives Hazel an idea: he chews through the leash of Bob, the Nuthanger Farm watchdog, and Blackberry, Dandelion, and Hyzenthlay bait him into following them back to the warren. When the Efrafans break through the warren's defences, Woundwort goes in alone. Blackavar attacks him but is easily killed. Bigwig ambushes Woundwort and they fight to a standstill. When Bob arrives, Woundwort abandons Bigwig and emerges from the warren, refuses to flee and fearlessly stands his ground until Bob notices him, and the two lunge at each other. No trace of Woundwort is ever found, and his fate is left a mystery.

Several years later, an elderly Hazel is visited by the Black Rabbit, who invites him to join his own Owsla, assuring him of Watership Down's perpetual safety. Reassured, Hazel accepts and dies peacefully. His spirit follows the Black Rabbit through the woodland and trees towards the Sun, which metamorphoses into Frith, and the afterlife, as Frith's parting advice to El-Ahrairah is heard once more.

== Cast ==
- John Hurt as Hazel
- Richard Briers as Fiver
- Michael Graham Cox as Bigwig
- John Bennett as Captain Holly
- Ralph Richardson as the Chief Rabbit of Sandleford
- Simon Cadell as Blackberry
- Terence Rigby as Silver
- Roy Kinnear as Pipkin
- Richard O'Callaghan as Dandelion
- Denholm Elliott as Cowslip
- Lynn Farleigh as Tab the cat
- Mary Maddox as Clover
- Zero Mostel as Kehaar
- Harry Andrews as General Woundwort
- Hannah Gordon as Hyzenthlay
- Nigel Hawthorne as Campion
- Clifton Jones as Blackavar
- Derek Griffiths as Vervain and Chervil
- Michael Hordern as Frith
- Joss Ackland as the Black Rabbit
- Michelle Price as Lucy

== Production ==
Producer Martin Rosen purchased film rights for the story. He was assisted by merchant banker Jake Eberts, who enjoyed the experience so much it launched Eberts's career in the film industry. The option for the film rights was £50,000. Rosen estimated the budget at $2.4 million. Eberts was rejected by Rank and EMI Films but raised $1 million from the Pearson company and clients of the merchant bank Lazard.

Production of the film began in 1975. It was originally going to be directed by John Hubley, who left after disagreements with the film's producer Martin Rosen. His work can still be found in the film, most notably in the opening "fable" scene. He was replaced by Rosen who thereby made his directorial debut. The senior animator on the project was Arthur Humberstone, whose signature art style defined the look of the key characters. The backgrounds and locations, including Watership Down itself, the farm, the Efrafa warren, and the nearby railway, are based on the diagrams and maps in Richard Adams's original novel. Most of the locations in the film either exist or were based on real spots in Hampshire and surrounding downlands.

=== Music ===
The score was written by Angela Morley, who developed the initial theme drafted by Malcolm Williamson. Morley replaced Williamson after he had fallen behind and only composed the prelude and main title theme in sketch form. A list of the musical cues for the film can be found on the composer's website, which also gives information about the different composers working on the project.

The soundtrack includes Art Garfunkel's British No. 1 hit, "Bright Eyes", which was written by the British singer and songwriter Mike Batt. The composer recorded three songs with vocals by Garfunkel, but only "Bright Eyes" made it to the film. The song "Losing Your Way in the Rain" has a very similar feeling and arrangement, and was recorded by the former Zombies vocalist Colin Blunstone in 1979. Garfunkel's version of the second song was heard years later, on the Watership Down TV series soundtrack released in 2000. The song, like many others which appeared on the TV soundtrack, was never used in the series.

== Release and reception ==
Watership Down was first released to the UK on 19 October 1978, initially running in just five London cinemas—paid for by the producers—as the producers struggled to find distributors because the marketing departments could not work out if it was an adult or children's film. This enabled strong bargaining to secure a high percentage of the ticket sales. In British cinemas, the film was preceded by the 1974 live-action short film Tahere Tikitiki: The Making of a Māori Canoe.

=== Box office ===
The film was very successful at the box office. According to financier Jake Eberts, the investors who put up the $50,000 development finance "got their money back with interest, plus an additional $450,000, making a total of ten times their investment". Other investors in the film reportedly received a return of 5,000% on their investment.

=== Awards ===
The film was nominated for the Hugo Award for Best Dramatic Presentation in 1979.

=== Reception and legacy ===
On US review aggregator website Rotten Tomatoes, the film has an 81% approval rating based on 37 reviews. Its critical consensus reads, "Aimed at adults perhaps more than children, this is a respectful, beautifully animated adaptation of Richard Adams's beloved book." Gene Siskel and Roger Ebert were divided on their opinions of Watership Down on their show Sneak Previews. Siskel thought that the film was too long, but that otherwise he found "most of it very effective" due to the film's success at situating the audience in the rabbits' point of view which put him "in touch with the delicate and brutal balance of nature". He also called the film "more mature than what we usually expect or get from an animated feature film". However, Ebert felt that the realism of the story, which he liked, did not match with the style of animation which he described as "soft-edged, cuddly and like a cartoon".

Some critics commented on the film's success as an adaptation, such as Philip French for The Observer, who wrote that "the novel's texture isn't there and the characters never take on strong pictorial identities". Later in the review he elaborated that the rabbit characters are "blandly drawn" and concluded that the film as a whole is "difficult to enthuse over". In The Times, David Robinson also criticised the film's translation to the screen as inaccessible for "People who come to the film without the assistance of the book", as they "may well have a little difficulty with the special lore and language of Richard Adams's rabbit civilisation" and with the fictional Lapine language spoken by the rabbits. Robinson nevertheless complimented the voice acting and the "fresh and pleasant" animation design. On the other hand, Jay Scott for The Globe and Mail described the animation backgrounds of the film as "second-rate shopping mall watercolor landscapes", but praised the film's allegorical aspects (drawing comparisons between the villain General Woundwort and Adolf Hitler), the realistic and compassionate approach to its rabbit characters, and the voice cast.

The Daily Mail's Margaret Hinxman also praised the voice acting, the "delicious" music, and called the background landscapes "superb", but concluded that "Watership Down is by no stretch of the imagination a Disney-type animation feature film. Sadly, I have to say, if it had been I might have enjoyed it more." However, other critics drew favourable comparisons with Disney, notably Julian Fox in Films and Filming, who called Watership Down "far and away the most exciting and totally involving animated feature since Disney's peak years (ie that period which ended with Pinocchio, Dumbo and Bambi)." He praised in particular the aesthetics, sound design, and the film's way of humanising the rabbit characters without over-anthropomorphising them. The Guardian's Derek Malcolm also complimented Kehaar the seagull's "most Disney-like" animation style even though he found the film as a whole to be "old-fashioned" and the song "Bright Eyes" to be "more than a trifle bland".

In a joint review of Watership Down and Ralph Bakshi's The Lord of the Rings, animation historian Michael Barrier described both films as "very stupid movies, of a special kind" and that "the films themselves show no sign that any intelligence was at work in making them" due to their "grim literalism" in adapting their source texts. He did describe Watership Down as the "least offensive" of the two but nevertheless characterised the animation style as "graceless" and expressed disappointment that the vision of the film's original director John Hubley was never fully realised. Newsweek's David Ansen also drew comparisons with The Lord of the Rings, but while he disliked Bakshi's film he was more effusive about Watership Down, which he said "has the relentless momentum of a good war movie" and "is swift of foot, graced with wit, and capable of touching the hearts of both children and adults".

In a review of the DVD edition, Film Freak Central's Walter Chaw praised the film for offering an "unusually thoughtful" alternative to Disney animated films of the era: "Watership Down arose in that extended lull between Disney's heyday and its late-Eighties resurrection. ... Watership Down points to the dwindled potential for American animation to evolve into what anime has become: a mature medium for artistic expression of serious issues." Chaw commended the film's frankness, honesty, and themes of friendship and loyalty, concluding that, in spite of the film's violent elements, "the picture may be more appropriate for young children than a legion of condescendingly sugar-coated Disney fare."

=== Alleged effects on children and BBFC classification ===
Watership Down has developed a reputation as a distressing children's film, with Ed Power of The Independent describing the film in a 40th anniversary retrospective as a "classic", but which "arguably traumatised an entire generation". Power referred in part to a 2016 screening of the film by British broadcaster Channel 5, which faced criticism online after broadcasting the film in a pre-watershed slot on Easter Sunday. This was seen to be in poor taste by some viewers, due to the film's representations of violence, with users on social media expressing concern about child viewers being distressed. However, there is no substantial evidence that any children have been negatively affected by Watership Down as a result of this broadcast, and Channel 5 went on to broadcast it on Easter Sunday again the following year.

When the film was originally released in the UK, initial regulators and critics expressed little concern about the film's potential effects on children. When first submitted to the British Board of Film Classification (BBFC), it passed with a U (universal, suitable for all) classification. The BBFC reasoned that "Animation removes the realistic gory horror in the occasional scenes of violence and bloodshed, and we felt that, while the film may move children emotionally during the film's duration, it could not seriously trouble them once the spell of the story is broken, and that a 'U' certificate was therefore quite appropriate." In 2012, the BBFC acknowledged that it had "received complaints about the suitability of Watership Down at 'U' almost every year since its classification". In August 2022, the BBFC raised the classification to PG for "mild violence, threat, brief bloody images, language".

Like the BBFC, critics during initial release characterised Watership Down as suitable for children in spite of its potentially distressing aspects. The Spectator's Ted Whitehead described it as "a straightforward children's adventure story". Scott in The Globe and Mail wrote that "Parents are more apt to feel squeamish about this than their children: there is nothing as devastating as the death of Bambi's mother. In Watership Down, some of the rabbits are unlucky and some live to old age. When they do die, the deaths are treated with sympathy but not morbidity. The message is that life is hard, and difficult, but that it's fun, and rewarding, too." Malcolm in The Guardian dismissed contemporary concerns about the film's suitability for children by stating that "It is not true, as had already been hinted at by some, that the film is too violent and disturbing for children. What, pray, about some of Grimms' fairy tales?" Fox in Films and Filming was one of the few critics to express caution by saying that, because of the "graphic horror", "one could scarcely recommend the film to the very young".

More recently, critics and scholars have defended Watership Down's potential value for child audiences. Children's media scholar Catherine Lester argues that the violence is "never without a specific narrative or moral purpose" and that discussions of the film's effect upon children require "greater nuance" that acknowledges the complexity and variety of children as viewers and how they respond to films. Gerard Jones, in his essay for The Criterion Collection, admits that the film "has troubled me ever since I first saw it" at the age of twenty-one, but that he believes it is an important film for viewers of all ages because it "asks us to spend time with those elements of existence that we will always find most troubling (and haunting and moving), and that we so rarely allow our children's culture or our own entertainment to dwell on." He cites as an example the non-violent death of Hazel from old age at the end of the film, which he calls "as joyous as it is poignant".

== Media ==
=== Picture book ===
A picture book adaptation was also produced, titled The Watership Down Film Picture Book. Two editions of the book were published, one a hardcover, the other a reinforced cloth-bound edition. The contents include film stills linked with a combination of narration and extracts from the script, as well as a preface by Adams and a foreword by Rosen.

=== Home media releases ===
Watership Down was initially released on VHS in the UK by Thorn EMI Video, then later by Guild Home Video and later by PolyGram Video. It was given a DVD release in 2001 by Universal Pictures Home Entertainment and another in 2005 from Warner Home Video.

In the US, Watership Down was first released on CED in 1981 by RCA SelectaVision VideoDiscs and was given a VHS and Betamax release in 1983 by Warner Home Video. The film was re-released a number of times on VHS in the US by Warner Home Video, including through their Warner Bros. Classic Tales label, and was released on DVD in the US in 2002 and again in 2008. The 2002 DVD release was later duplicated for Warner Bros' 2005 DVD release in the UK, with the only difference being the film being converted to PAL format.

A UK Blu-ray for the film was planned to be released in 2010 but, due to a rights dispute between Euro-London Films, Universal Pictures, and Warner Bros., the release was cancelled. Warner eventually put out a BD release in Germany, where it held distribution rights. The UK Blu-ray was eventually released in 2013 by Universal using the same HD master as on Warner's 2008 DVD and 2011 German Blu-ray release. In 2014, Euro-London Films acquired the remaining US rights from Warner Bros. (who had held US distribution rights since the 1980s) and licensed the film to The Criterion Collection for release on DVD, Blu-ray and streaming in 2015 and Janus Films for theatrical repertory runs.

The British Film Institute planned to release the film as a 4K Ultra HD Blu-ray in the UK in February 2023, but cancelled the release due to external issues beyond their control. In July 2024, however, the company announced a release date of 11 November 2024. A trailer for the 4K restoration was released on 11 September 2024. The restored film premiered at the 2024 BFI London Film Festival on 12 October 2024, and was released in UK and Irish cinemas on 25 October.

== Bibliography ==
- Eberts, Jake; Illott, Terry (1990). My indecision is final. Faber and Faber.
