= The Girl on a Swing =

The Girl on a Swing may refer to:

- The Girl on a Swing (1926 film), by Felix Basch
- The Girl in a Swing (novel) (1980), by Richard Adams
- The Girl in a Swing (1988 film), by Gordon Hessler
- "Girl on a Swing", song by Gerry and the Pacemakers
- Girl on a Swing (mural), a mural on the Broadway Leasehold Building, believed to be painted by Banksy
