= Traveller (horse) =

Horse in the American Civil War

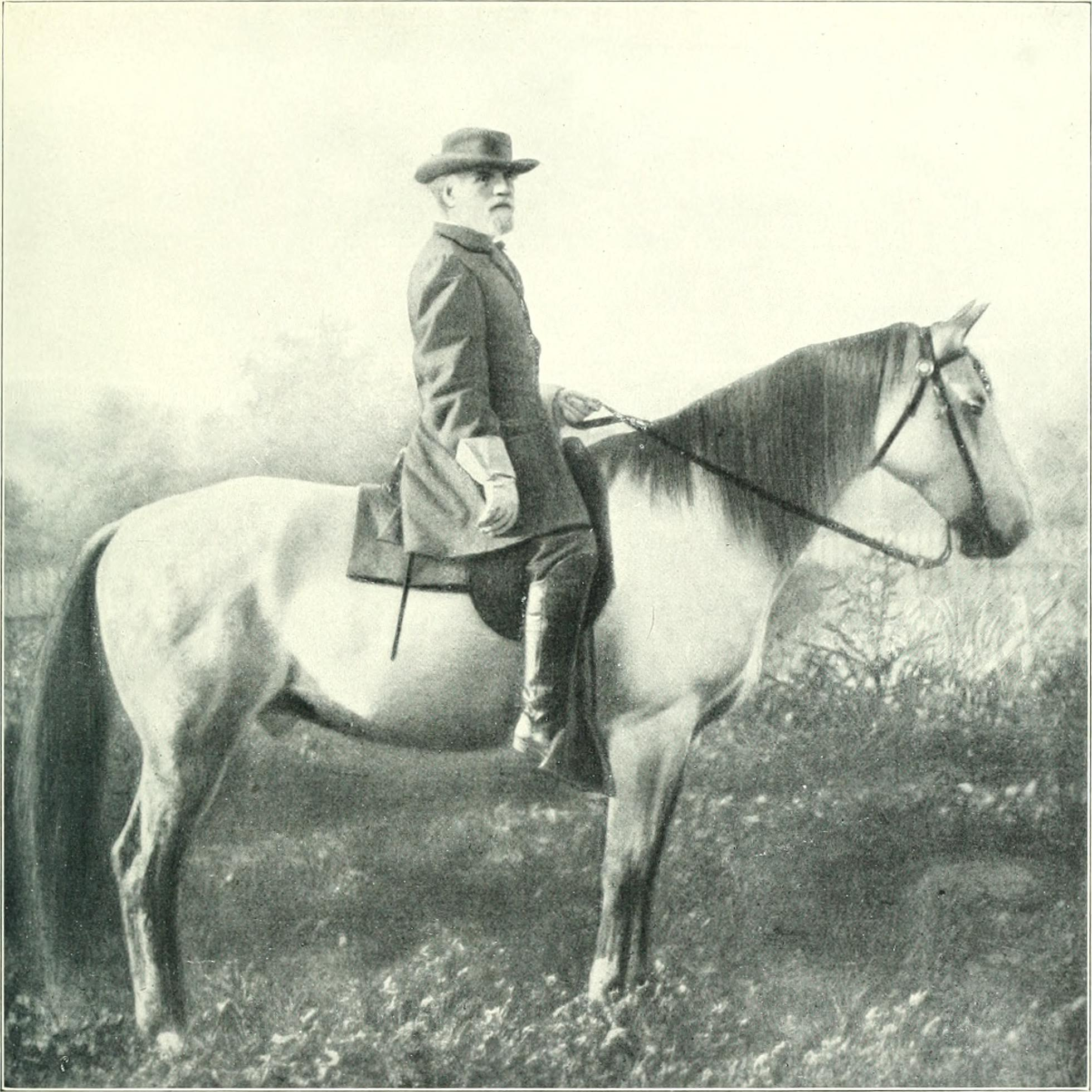
- Traveller and Robert E. Lee
- Other names: Jeff Davis, Greenbrier
- Species: Equus ferus caballus
- Breed: American Saddlebred
- Sex: Male
- Born: 1857; Near Blue Sulphur Springs, Greenbrier County, Virginia
- Died: 1871
- Resting place: Washington and Lee University
- Occupation: War horse
- Owner: General Robert E. Lee
- Parents: Grey Eagle (sire), Flora (mare)
- Weight: 1100 lb (500 kg)
- Height: 16 hands (64 in 163 cm)
- Appearance: Gray in color with dark point coloration

Traveller (1857–1871) was Confederate General Robert E. Lee's most famous horse during the American Civil War. He was a gray American Saddlebred of 16 hands (64 inches, 163 cm), notable for speed, strength and courage in combat. Lee acquired him in February 1862 and rode him in many battles. Traveller outlived Lee by only a few months and was put down when he contracted untreatable tetanus.

== Birth and war service ==
Traveller, sired by notable Thoroughbred racehorse Grey Eagle, and originally named Jeff Davis, was born to Flora in 1857 near the Blue Sulphur Springs, in Greenbrier County, Virginia in present-day West Virginia and was first owned and raised by James W. Johnston. Traveller was trained by Frank Winfield Page, a young enslaved boy. An American Saddlebred, Traveller was of Grey Eagle stock; as a colt, he took the first prize at the Lewisburg, Virginia fairs in 1859 and 1860. As an adult he was a sturdy horse, 16 hands (64 inches, 163 cm) high and 1,100 pounds (500 kg), iron gray in color with black point coloration, a long mane and a flowing tail. He was next owned by Captain Joseph M. Broun and renamed Greenbrier.

In the spring of 1861, a year before achieving fame as a Confederate general, Robert E. Lee was commanding a small force in western Virginia. The quartermaster of the 3rd Regiment, Wise Legion, Captain Joseph M. Broun, was directed to "purchase a good serviceable horse of the best Greenbrier stock for our use during the war." Broun purchased the horse for $175 (approximately $4,545 in 2008) from Andrew Johnston's son, Captain James W. Johnston, and named him Greenbrier. Major Thomas L. Broun, Joseph's brother recalled that Greenbrier:

... was greatly admired in camp for his rapid, springy walk, his high spirit, bold carriage, and muscular strength. He needed neither whip nor spur, and would walk his five or six miles an hour over the rough mountain roads of Western Virginia with his rider sitting firmly in the saddle and holding him in check by a tight rein, such vim and eagerness did he manifest to go right ahead so soon as he was mounted.

— Major Thomas L. Broun

General Lee took a great fancy to the horse. He called him his "colt" and predicted to Broun that he would use it before the war was over. After Lee was transferred to South Carolina, Joseph Broun sold the horse to him for $200 in February 1862. Lee named the horse "Traveller".

Lee described his horse in a letter in response to his wife's cousin, Markie Williams, who wished to paint a portrait of Traveller:

If I was an artist like you, I would draw a true picture of Traveller; representing his fine proportions, muscular figure, deep chest, short back, strong haunches, flat legs, small head, broad forehead, delicate ears, quick eye, small feet, and black mane and tail. Such a picture would inspire a poet, whose genius could then depict his worth, and describe his endurance of toil, hunger, thirst, heat and cold; and the dangers and suffering through which he has passed. He could dilate upon his sagacity and affection, and his invariable response to every wish of his rider. He might even imagine his thoughts through the long night-marches and days of the battle through which he has passed. But I am no artist Markie, and can therefore only say he is a Confederate gray.

— Robert E. Lee, letter to Markie Williams

Traveller was a horse of great stamina and was usually a good horse for an officer in battle because he was difficult to frighten. He could sometimes become nervous and spirited, however. At the Second Battle of Bull Run, while General Lee was at the front reconnoitering, dismounted and holding Traveller by the bridle, the horse became frightened at some movement of the enemy and, plunging, pulled Lee down on a stump, breaking both of his hands. Lee went through the remainder of that campaign chiefly in an ambulance. When he rode on horseback, a courier rode in front leading his horse.

Lee was conscious of the welfare of the horses in the Army in general. During the Peninsula Campaign, he instructed J. E. B. Stuart, "Endeavor to spare your horses as much as possible, and charge your officers to look to their comfort." At Gettysburg he admonished an officer who was beating his horse: "Don’t whip him, captain; it does no good. I had a foolish horse, once, and kind treatment is the best." On the day he surrendered his army to Grant at Appomattox, an aide brought him a message, having ridden his horse to exhaustion. Lee reprimanded him, saying "Why did you do it? You have killed your beautiful horse." In later life he doted on Traveller. Lee's wife wrote, "He does not like to part even for a time from his beloved steed".

After the war, Traveller accompanied Lee to Washington College in Lexington, Virginia. He lost many hairs from his tail to admirers (veterans and college students) who wanted a souvenir of the famous horse and his general. Lee wrote to his daughter Mildred Childe Lee that "the boys are plucking out his tail, and he is presenting the appearance of a plucked chicken."

== Death and burials ==
In 1870, during Robert E. Lee's funeral procession, Traveller was led behind the caisson bearing the general's casket, his saddle, and bridle draped with black crepe. Not long after Lee's death, in 1871, Traveller stepped on a nail and developed tetanus. There was no cure, and he was shot to relieve his suffering.

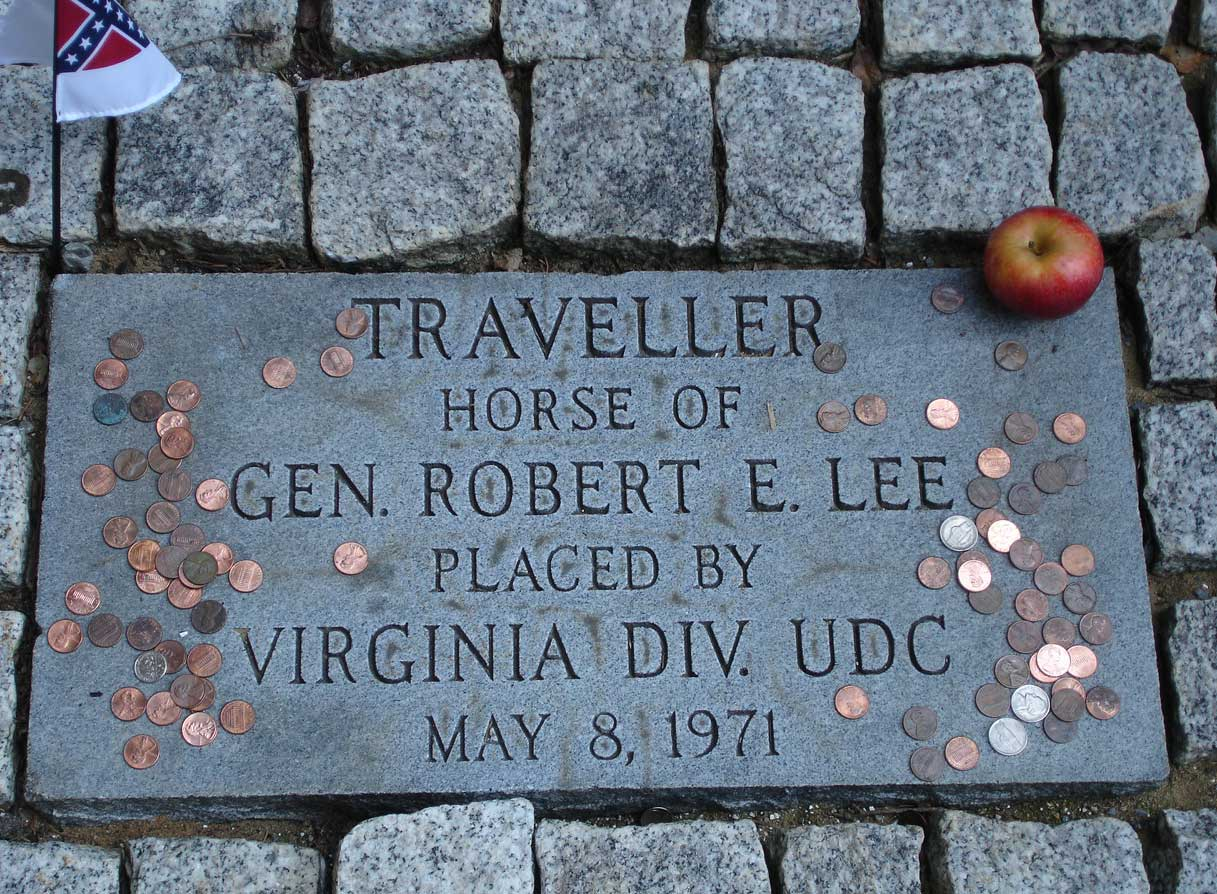
Traveller's grave at University Chapel, Washington and Lee University

Traveller was initially buried behind the main buildings of the college, but was unearthed by persons unknown and his bones were bleached for exhibition in Rochester, New York, in 1875/1876. In 1907, Richmond journalist Joseph Bryan paid to have the bones mounted and returned to the college, named Washington and Lee University since Lee's death, and they were displayed in the Brooks Museum in what is now Robinson Hall. The skeleton was periodically vandalized there by students who carved their initials in it for good luck. In 1929, the bones were moved to the museum in the basement of the University Chapel, where they stood for 30 years, deteriorating with exposure.

Finally in 1971, Traveller's remains were buried in a wooden box encased in concrete next to the chapel on the Washington and Lee campus, a few feet away from the Lee family crypt inside, where his master's body rests. The stable where he lived his last days, directly connected to the Lee House on campus, traditionally stands with its doors left open; this is said to allow his spirit to wander freely. The 24th President of Washington and Lee (and thus a recent resident of Lee House), Thomas Burish, caught strong criticism from many members of the Washington and Lee community for closing the stable gates in violation of this tradition. Burish later had the doors to the gates repainted in a dark green color, which he referred to in campus newspapers as "Traveller Green".

In 2023, following community protests, the headstone of Traveller was replaced by a new headstone, removing any mention of General Lee. The university later removed a separate campus plaque honoring Traveller.

The now-defunct post newspaper of the United States Army's Fort Lee, located in Petersburg, Virginia, was named Traveller.

== Traveller in verse ==
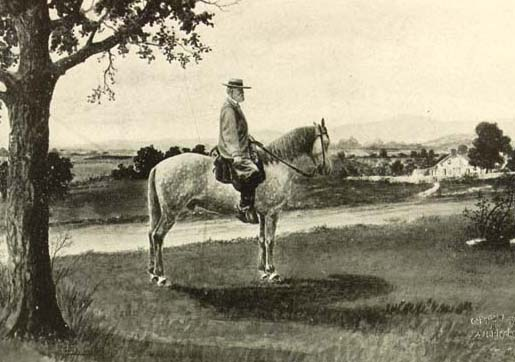
Traveller and Robert E. Lee

And now at last,
Comes Traveller and his master. Look at them well.
The horse is an iron-grey, sixteen hands high,
Short back, deep chest, strong haunch, flat legs, small head,
Delicate ear, quick eye, black mane and tail,
Wise brain, obedient mouth.
Such horses are
The jewels of the horseman's hands and thighs,
They go by the word and hardly need the rein.
They bred such horses in Virginia then,
Horses that were remembered after death
And buried not so far from Christian ground
That if their sleeping riders should arise
They could not witch them from the earth again
And ride a printless course along the grass
With the old manage and light ease of hand.

— Passage from "John Brown's Body", a 1928 poem by Stephen Vincent Benét

Their sleepless, bloodshot eyes were turned to me.
Their flags hung black against the pelting sky.
Their jests and curses echoed whisperingly,
As though from long-lost years of sorrow - Why,
You're weeping! What, then? What more did you see?
A gray man on a gray horse rode by.

— Passage from Traveller, a 1988 novel by Richard Adams

== Lee's other horses ==
Although the most famous, Traveller was not Lee's only horse during the war:

- Lucy Long, a mare, was the primary backup horse to Traveller. She remained with the Lee family after the war, dying considerably after Lee, when she was thirty-four years old. She was a gift from J.E.B. Stuart who purchased her from Adam Stephen Dandridge of The Bower. Notably, she was ridden by Lee at the Battle of Chancellorsville.
- Richmond, a bay colored stallion, was acquired by General Lee in early 1861. He died in 1862 after the Battle of Malvern Hill.
- Brown-Roan, or The Roan, was purchased by Lee in West Virginia around the time of Traveller's purchase. He went blind in 1862 and had to be retired.
- Ajax, a sorrel horse, was too large for Lee to ride comfortably and was thus used infrequently.

James Longstreet, one of Lee's most trusted generals, was referred to by Lee as his Old War Horse because of his reliability. After the Civil War, many Southerners were angered by Longstreet's defection to the Republican Party and blamed him for their defeat in the Civil War. However, Lee supported reconciliation and was pleased with how Longstreet had fought in the War. This nickname was Lee's symbol of trust.

== In popular media ==
- Moonrunners (a 1975 movie that spawned the TV series The Dukes of Hazzard) featured a dirt-track racing car, a 1955 Chevrolet, with a Confederate flag on the roof, named "Traveller". (Traveller was later transformed into the painted up street car, a 1969 Dodge Charger, known as the "General Lee" in the TV series.)
- Connie Willis, Lincoln's Dreams (1987). Every chapter of the book begins with a paragraph about Traveller.
- Adams, Richard. Traveller New York: Knopf, 1988. ISBN 0-440-20493-3. A fictional first-person narrative, in dialect, by Traveller. His equine memoirs are told to a cat in the stable of the retired general.
- In Bronco Benny, from the Belgian comic Les Tuniques Bleues, Traveller has a major role. Only Bronco Benny, best horse tamer of the Union, is able to break in the proud horse. His capture causes war with Native Americans who see Traveller as a divinity. In the end, when the heroes fake death, Lee doesn't notice them but Traveller does and displays a little affection for them.
- In the children's book The Strange Case of Origami Yoda, one character says he mistook a bust of William Shakespeare made from Play-Doh for Robert E. Lee's horse.

== See also ==
- Horsemanship of Ulysses S. Grant
- List of horses of the American Civil War
- List of historical horses
- War horse

== General and cited references ==
- Southern Historical Society Papers, Richmond, Va., January–December, 1890.
- Lee's Horses at Stratford Hall website
- General Lee's Traveller, On the Campus of Washington and Lee, brochure published by the Lee Chapel Museum, 2005.
- Korda, Michael (2014). Clouds of Glory: The Life and Legend of Robert E. Lee. HarperCollins Publishers. ISBN 978-0-06-2116291.
- Magner, Blake A. Traveller & Company, The Horses of Gettysburg. Gettysburg, PA: Farnsworth House Military Impressions, 1995. ISBN 0-9643632-2-4.
- From War Horse To Saddle Horse, American Saddlebred, November/December 1998.
- Pendleton, Robert A. Traveller: General Robert E. Lee's Favorite Greenbrier War Horse. Bloomington, IN: Trafford Publishing, 2005. ISBN 9781412049146
