= Quiso =

Quiso may refer to:

- A fictionary island in the novel Shardik
- A Quasi-isomorphism in mathematics
