= Traveller (novel) =

1988 historical novel by Richard Adams

- First UK edition
- Author: Richard Adams
- Language: English
- Genre: War Fantasy novel
- Publisher: Alfred A. Knopf (US); Hutchinson (UK); Little, Brown (Canada)
- Publication date: May 12, 1988
- Publication place: United Kingdom
- Media type: Print (hardback & paperback)
- Pages: 269 pp
- ISBN: 0-440-20493-3
- OCLC: 17442395

Traveller is a historical novel written by Richard Adams in 1988. It recounts the American Civil War through the viewpoint of Traveller, the favorite horse of Confederate General Robert E. Lee.

== Plot ==
In his stable, Traveller, the favorite horse of retired Civil War general Robert E. Lee, relates the story of his life and experiences to his feline friend Tom. His narrative, meant to begin in the early spring of 1866, follows the events of the war as seen through a horse's eyes, from the time he was bought by General Lee in 1862 until Lee's death in 1870.

At the end of the novel, Traveller, with undying faith in Lee, remains convinced that the Confederate Army beat the Union and that Lee is now "commander of the country" (versus his actual postbellum role as president of Washington University). Despite being led in Lee's funeral procession, Traveller does not understand that his master has died and will not return to ride again.

== Narrative style ==
The main character, Traveller, relates his life story aloud to his friend Tom, a cat with whom he shares the barn. As such the entire narrative is written in a way meant to portray a Southern accent, reflecting Traveller's locality. The events of the war are told from the horse's point of view.

== Characters ==
=== Horses ===
==== Major military horses ====
- Traveller – A gray American Saddlebred gelding with a dark mane. The narrator of the novel. Originally named Jeff Davis.
- Richmond – An aggressive bay stallion belonging to "Marse Robert" (Robert E. Lee). Died of colic.
- Brown-Roan – Also known as The Roan. A good-natured gelding of Marse Robert's. Had to be retired after going blind.
- Little Sorrel – "Cap-in-his-Eye's" horse, also known as Old Sorrel. One of Traveller's closest friends. Sorrel sometimes foresees the future, predicting Cap-in-his-Eye's death shortly before it happens.
- Skylark – "Jine-the-Cavalry's" primary horse. Proud, but friendly.
- Joker – Major Talcott's horse. Usually good-humored and sarcastic.

==== Minor military horses ====
- Ajax – A large sorrel gelding given to Marse Roberts after he injures his hands. Rarely used due to his size. Died after Lee's retirement from injuries sustained from a sharp prong on a gate latch.
- Brigand – A large black horse belonging to General Mahone
- Buckthorn – An artillery general's horse
- Champ – "Red Shirt's" horse; Traveller learns of Red Shirt's death from him. After Red Shirt's death, Champ is ridden by Sergeant Tucker.
- Chieftain – "Little General's" horse; dies after his legs are shot out by a Union soldier at the Battle of Gettysburg.
- Cincinnati – A black horse belonging to Union Army General Ulysses S. Grant. Traveller meets him at the surrender at Appomattox, under the assumption that it is the Union Army that has surrendered.
- Crockett – An old horse shot and killed in front of Traveller at the Battle of Sayler's Creek
- Dancer – Captain Wilbourn's horse
- Frigate – A horse that informs Traveller of Old Pete's injuries at the Battle of the Wilderness
- Ginger – Colonel Long's horse
- Ivy – A mare
- Leopard – Major Venable's mount
- Lucy Long – A mare purchased as Marse Roberts's backup horse after his hands were injured in an accident.
- Mercury – General Marshall's mount
- Merlin – Sergeant Tucker's mount
- Misty – A gray horse belonging to a gunnery officer
- Rollo – A haughty, bragging stallion belonging to one of Jine-the-Cavalry's men
- Romeo – A black gelding belonging to Ringlets
- Sovereign – Eppa's horse
- Star of the East – Jine-the-Cavalry's secondary mount
- Trumpeter – A chestnut horse belonging to one of Red Shirt's commanders

==== Other horses ====
- Bandit – One of Traveller's stablemates during his time with Joe
- Bluebird – Captain White's filly
- Daffodil – A mare
- Emerald – A pretty mare belonging to Judge Cox' wife.
- Flora – Traveller's mother
- Frisky – An old nag
- Monarch – A stallion at Blue Sulphur Springs
- Moonlight – A filly at Blue Sulphur Springs
- Ruby – A mare belonging to Andy
- Ruffian – A gelding at Blue Sulphur Springs; towards the end of the war, Traveller meets Ruffian again, injured and exhausted, having been abandoned by the side of a road. He later learns that Ruffian recovered and was retired to a farm.
- Thunder – Confederate President Jefferson Davis's horse

=== Other animals ===
- Tom the Nipper – Miss Life's cat. Traveller relates his story to Tom through the novel.
- Baxter – Another barn cat at the estate
- Sandy – A goat sharing the barn with Traveller at Lee's estate
- Dragon and Logan – Two mules belonging to a farmer the soldiers meet on a march

=== Humans ===
Although based on existing historic figures, most of the humans in the novel are given nicknames by Traveller. The following is a list of the human characters' real names and corresponding nicknames, as well as the horse or horses that usually accompany them.

==== Major military men ====
- "Marse Robert" – General Robert E. Lee. Called "Marse Robert" after Traveller hears a stablehand refer to him as such. His horses are Traveller, Richmond, Brown-Roan, Lucy Long, and Ajax.
- "Cap-in-his-Eyes" – General Stonewall Jackson. Traveller's name for Jackson comes from his true-to-life habit of wearing his hat pulled low over his face. His horse is Little Sorrel.
- "Jine-the-Cavalry" – General J.E.B. Stuart. Traveller dubbed him "Jine-the-Cavalry" (a common pronunciation of the military song Join the Cavalry) after the general made the statement several times during their first encounter. His horses are Skylark and Star of the East.
- "Red Shirt" – General A. P. Hill. His horse is Champ.
- "The Little General"- General Daniel Harvey Hill
- "Ringlets" – General George Pickett. His horse is Romeo.
- "Old Pete" – General James Longstreet. His horse is Hero.
- "Sweeny" – Joel Sweeney. One of Jine-the-Cavalry's men, known for playing his banjo.
- "The Fat General" General Lafayette McLaws. One of Old Pete's commanders.
- "The Bald General" – General Richard S. Ewell
- "The Cussing General" – General Jubal Early
- "Marse Taylor" – Major Walter H. Taylor, Lee's aide-de-camp
- "Vot-you-voz" – Heros von Borcke. Traveller gives his name as "Bork or Pork or something".
- Captain Joe Broun – Joseph M Broun. The quartermaster of the 3rd Virginia Infantry. Broun purchased Traveller from Captain Johnston and renamed him Greenbriar. He later sold him to General Lee. His horse is Traveller as Greenbriar.
- Major Talcott – His horse is Joker

==== Minor military men ====
- Captain Wilbourn – One of Cap-in-his-Eyes' officers. His horse is Dancer.
- Colonel Long – His horse is Ginger.
- Colonel Marshall – Charles Marshall, Lee's military secretary. Rides with Lee and the other generals at the surrender at Appomattox. His horse is Mercury.
- Colonel Sorrel – Gilbert Moxley Sorrel, General Longstreet's chief of staff.
- Eppa – Eppa Hunton. One of Ringlets' officers. His horse is Sovereign.
- General Alexander – Edward Porter Alexander. Rides with Lee at the surrender at Appomattox.
- General Fitz Lee – Fitzhugh Lee, nephew of Robert E. Lee. Rides with Lee at the surrender at Appomattox.
- General Gordon – General John Brown Gordon.
- General Hood – General John Bell Hood
- General Johnston – General Joseph E. Johnston
- General McGowan – Samuel McGowan
- General Mahone – William Mahone. His horse is Brigand.
- General Pendleton – William N. Pendleton, chief of artillery for the Army of Northern Virginia.
- General Walker – James A. "Stonewall Jim" Walker
- General Wilcox – Cadmus M. Wilcox
- Major Venable – Charles S. Venable, one of Lee's aides. His horse is Leopard.
- Sergeant Tucker – George W. Tucker. Rides with Lee and the other generals at the surrender at Appomattox. His horse is Merlin.

==== Other humans ====
- "Miss Life" – Mildred "Precious Life" Childe Lee, youngest daughter of Robert E. Lee.
- "Miss Agnes" – Eleanor Agnes Lee, daughter of Robert E. Lee.
- "Mr. Custis" – George Washington Custis Lee, eldest son of Robert E. Lee.
- "Marse Rooney" – William Henry Fitzhugh Lee, second son of Robert E. Lee.
- Jim – Captain James W. Johnston. Traveller's original owner and trainer.
- Andy – Andrew Johnston. Jim's father.
- Zeb – A horse groomer at Blue Sulphur Springs.
- Mr. Senseney – The farrier at Lee's estate.
- Miss Dab
- Perry and Meredith – Two of General Lee's servants
- Bryan –
- The President – Confederate President Jefferson Davis
- Dave –
- Grace Darling –
- Jennie and Fannie – Two young girls near Lee's estate
- Isaiah –
- Captain White – Horse: Bluebird
- Mr. Turnbull – A man who lets Lee use his property as headquarters
- Judge Meredith – Solomon Meredith
- Judge Cox – A man who allows Lee to rest at his house after the Battle of Sayler's Creek.
