= Sid Meier's Colonization =

1994 video game

- Developer: MicroProse Chapel Hill
- Publisher: MicroProse
- Designers: Brian Reynolds; Sid Meier; Jeff Briggs; Douglas Kaufman
- Programmer: Brian Reynolds
- Artist: Barbara D. Bents
- Composers: Jeff Briggs; Ken Lagace; Roland J. Rizzo; Allister Brimble (Amiga)
- Series: Civilization
- Platforms: MS-DOS, Amiga, Windows, Mac
- Release: 1994: MS-DOS; 1995: Amiga, Mac, Windows 3.1
- Genre: Turn-based strategy
- Mode: Single-player

Sid Meier's Colonization is a turn-based strategy video game by Brian Reynolds and Sid Meier. It was developed at MicroProse's Chapel Hill studio for MS-DOS and published in 1994. The game is themed around European colonization of the New World from 1492–1850. Ports were released in 1995 for Windows 3.1, Amiga, and Mac. American video game publisher Tommo purchased the rights to Colonization in 2015 and digitally published it through their Retroism brand.

Colonization has more developed visual design and handling than Sid Meier's previous game Civilization (1991), but the two are markedly different in terms of gameplay. Instead of building up a nation from scratch, the player manages the cross-Atlantic expansion of an established country. As the colonies become more self-sufficient, their relationship with the colonial power declines from being beneficial to harmful, and to win the player must ultimately declare independence and defeat the Royal Expeditionary Force in battle.

== Gameplay ==
The main map

A colony producing furs, tobacco, coats, and cigars, among other things

The player controls the colonial forces of either England, France, the Netherlands or Spain; the other powers are played by the computer. Each nation has distinct abilities or bonuses that favor certain strategies. There is a choice between a historical map (America) or a randomly generated map (the New World), and players may also create their own map with the included scenario editor.

Aside from European colonial powers, the game simulates eight NPC powers of Indigenous peoples of the Americas, which the game calls "Indians", grouped into four categories of development. The semi-nomadic (Apache, Sioux, Tupi) and agrarian (Arawaks, Cherokee, Iroquois) tribes live in smaller settlements of camps and villages while the advanced Aztecs and civilized Incas live in larger, richer cities.

The journey begins with a ship and two units arriving in the New World in 1492. As the ship moves into the unknown, the map is revealed. The player then makes landfall, explores the land, meets the Indians, builds colonies and buildings, and works and improves the surrounding land. The ship can return to Europe to pick up more colonists and buy and sell items.

Colonists can work the land in squares adjoining the colony or within it. Different map squares yield different resources: for instance, most squares can produce food, while only forests yield lumber. Raw materials harvested from the land, such as cotton and tobacco, can be processed and converted into commodities (in this case cloth and cigars respectively), and sold at a much greater profit. Commodity prices in Europe rise and fall according to fluctuating supply and demand. The player can spend the money they gain to buy goods, speed construction, recruit new colonists, and buy ships and artillery. At times, the king may have reason to raise the colonial tax rate, for example to pay for a war taking place in Europe.

Players can manage their citizens by educating them to make them more productive in various skills such as farming, resource gathering and manufacturing. The player typically needs to protect their colonies from potential invasion by equipping and stationing soldiers.

Players may send missionaries into Indian settlements to convert them to Christianity. The Indians may accept and convert, or they may refuse and burn the missionary at the stake. If another colonial power has already established a mission in a settlement, a missionary may attempt to denounce them as heretics; this has a 50% chance of succeeding. An Indian settlement that has been converted to Christianity by a missionary sometimes produces converts, which the player gains control of and may send to a nearby colony. Converts are good at all land skills though poor at manufacturing.

When waging war, the player has a basic colonial army consisting of militiamen, artillery, cavalry, and ships. Weapons and soldiers can be purchased from Europe; however, to win independence, the player will need to develop a home-grown arms industry. Indians will initially only have braves and no horses or guns; over time they may obtain them via trade or by defeating colonial forces in battle. Guns and horses must be available in a colony to equip citizens and turn them into soldiers. If a colonial power captures a colony, it will remain in their possession unless it is retaken by force. Indians will burn a colony if they capture it.

Colonies are most often built on the coast; although they can be built inland, the player must build wagon trains to transport goods to and between inland colonies. In addition, it is necessary to use wagons when trading with inland Indian settlements. Goods may be sent back to Europe for sale or sold to Indian settlements or, later on, to colonial powers.

Colonists come in four types. The free citizen has no particular skills but performs all jobs adequately. The indentured servant is suitable at working the land but less so at manufacturing. If he is educated for long enough, he will be promoted to a free citizen; this may also happen when he wins a battle. The petty criminal, like the indentured servant, is only useful for unskilled labor and can be promoted to indentured servant in a similar manner.

Free colonists can learn all specialties via education, provided the player already has one such specialist. To enable this, a schoolhouse and eventually a college and university can be built. Most specialisms can also be bought in Europe, though this is often at a hefty price. Each Indian settlement can also train one regular colonist (a free colonist or indentured servant only) into a specialist by staying in an Indian settlement for a turn. Indians can train some land specialists which cannot be obtained from Europe, such as Master Tobacco Planter, though occasionally free citizens are randomly upgraded to specialist level if they do the same job for a long time.

Horses must initially be imported from Europe. If any colony produces food to excess and has 2 or more horses, the horses will breed. An unskilled colonist (including a petty criminal) who enters a neutral or friendly Indian settlement on horseback may (rarely) be killed, may be given a gift, or may be promoted to be a specialist scout. Seasoned scouts have a better chance of getting a favorable reaction when entering a settlement, and an improved chance of discovering a fabled Fountain of Youth when investigating ancient ruins. This causes a sudden influx of potential colonists to the player's European port. Furthermore, mounted soldiers are more effective and have a better survival rate than dismounted infantry.

Analogous to "World Wonders" in the Civilization series of games, social and industrial advances are achieved by the addition of "Founding Fathers" to the "Continental Congress". These are gained by colonists generating sufficient "Liberty Bells", a representation of colonial pride. These are all named after real historical figures, such as Francisco Coronado and Pocahontas.

One main driving impulse in Colonization is the gathering of natural resources, such as lumber (for building), ore (for manufacturing), and food (for population growth). Squares on the map have basic values of resource output (depending on the type of terrain and if a river runs through it), but certain "prime" squares have higher or double output values, making them highly desirable. Pioneers can expend tools to create roads on tiles, increasing their yield and removing terrain movement penalties, or remove features such as forests to make room for agriculture. They can also "plow" flat terrain to increase agricultural yields.

The ultimate goal of the game is winning independence from the mother country. When the player has a sufficiently high percentage of "Sons of Liberty", he may choose to declare independence. He then has to defeat most of the King's army to win, which is not an easy task as the royal army and navy are individually more powerful and usually more numerous than the player's colonial forces. The King's troops are however unused to fighting in the New World and are more easily defeated in rough terrain. Other colonial powers may help with the enterprise, analogous to the French intervention in the American Revolutionary War. Of course, if the player has a large enough treasury, another foreign power may provide military aid in the form of mercenaries.

== Soundtrack ==
The soundtrack of Colonization includes over 20 compositions. Some are original works, but most are adaptations of traditional (though not necessary colonial-era) folk songs of the United States and the British Isles. Songs include "Shady Grove", "Jine the Cavalry", "Joe Clark", and also several folk songs adapted directly from arrangements on the 1990 album "Nine Points of Roguery" by folk group The Virginia Company. There are also many fife and drum songs, drawn from the repertoire of the American Revolution, such as "Road to Boston"; these are listed as "Independence Tunes" and "Military Tunes", and the game plays them during moments of colonial patriotism and warfare.

On the original DOS release, the soundtrack was synthesized in real-time by a sound card, while the soundtrack on the later Windows CD release was pre-synthesized.

== Development ==
Computer Gaming World's "The Rumor Bag" column reported in April 1994 that "MicroProse is working on a game like Sid Meier's Civilization that covers the Age of Colonization".

GOG.com released an emulated version for Microsoft Windows, Linux and Mac OS X in 2012.

== Reception ==
Reception

Review scores
Publication	Score
Computer Gaming World	3.5/5
Next Generation	4/5
PC Gamer (US)	85%

Sales of Sid Meier's Colonization surpassed 350,000 copies by September 1997.

In 1996, Colonization was ranked the fourth best game of all time by Amiga Power, and the 52nd of all time by PC Gamer UK in 1997.

Next Generation stated that "MPS Labs borrowed heavily from classic hits of the past to create a surprisingly addictive title with a flavor all its own."

== Remakes ==
FreeCol, released in 2003, is an open-source and fan-made remake of Colonization. It is under continued development.

The 2008 release Civilization IV: Colonization is a Firaxis remake of the original Colonization for Microsoft Windows. It uses the upgraded Civilization IV engine and features the original gameplay (with some changes, particularly to colonist education), 3D graphics, an updated AI, and multiplayer support.
