= Rafael Palacios (artist) =

American artist and illustrator

Rafael D. Palacios (1905–1993) was a Puerto Rican-American freelance artist and illustrator specializing in book jackets and maps for major U.S. publishers in the mid- and late 20th century. Among the notable maps of his prolific and highly successful career are those in most of Isaac Asimov's history books and in Bruce Catton's Civil War books.

== Biography ==
Of Spanish-Puerto Rican parentage, Palacios was born in Santo Domingo, capital of the Dominican Republic. When he was five months old his family moved to Puerto Rico. He was educated in the Puerto Rican schools, but as an artist was largely self-taught. In 1928 he did his first fine arts sketches while in San Juan. He made something of a specialty of Afro-Caribbean portraiture. Palacios moved to New York City in the 1930s and remained there until moving back to Puerto Rico around 1980.

In 1937 he was chosen, with two others, to represent Puerto Rico at the second annual Exhibition of American Art in New York City. In 1938 he also exhibited at the Delphic Studios in New York, where he presented his first display of Afro-Antillean art (a one-man show of his gouaches). That same year he also exhibited at the first Newspaper Artists' Exhibition in New York, and in several one-man shows at the Athenaeum in San Juan and at the University of Puerto Rico. Beginning in 1938 Palacios worked for American newspapers as an illustrator and translator of comic strips. In the mid-1940s, he shared a studio with several other freelance artists and did a number of covers and endpapers for Bantam Books. His endpapers had a strong cartographic quality and served a similar purpose with Dell Books' mapbacks.

In 1948, Palacios was chosen to produce the maps for Gen. Dwight D. Eisenhower's memoir, Crusade in Europe. Palacios later provided maps for Eisenhower's two volume memoir of his time in the White House, Mandate for Change and Waging Peace (which includes a "Map Portfolio by Rafael Palacios). Between the late 1940s and the early 1990s, Palacios published thousands of maps in several hundred books, many of them for Doubleday. Palacios specialized in endpaper maps and military history, particularly maps of World War II and the American Civil War. Palacios took over as the cartographer from George Annand for the Rivers of America series in 1956. The last 13 books in the series (1956–74) contain maps by him.

Over the course of his career, Palacios made maps for books by many politicians, generals, and literary figures, including: Lyndon Johnson, Winston Churchill, Herman Wouk, Leon Uris, Cornelius Ryan, Gabriel Garcia Marquez, Dean Acheson, Omar Bradley, Dee Brown, John Dos Passos, and John Toland.

Palacios' mapmaking style was notable for his preference of freehand lines, hand-lettered labels, and resistance to mechanical production and typeset lettering.

Palacios' papers, including original maps, correspondence, and books inscribed by the authors is now held at the Library of Congress.

== Works illustrated ==
- The Gift Horse (1945) by Frank Gruber (Bantam)
- The Fog Comes (1946) and Dead Center (1946) by Mary Collins (Bantam)
- Lydia Bailey (1947) by Kenneth Robert (Doubleday) [endpaper map]
- Crusade in Europe (1948) by Dwight D. Eisenhower (Doubleday)
- The Well of the Unicorn (1948) by Fletcher Pratt
- A Short History of the Civil War: Ordeal by Fire (1948) by Fletcher Pratt (William Sloane) [maps]
- The Return of Tarzan (1948 reprint), by E.R. Burroughs (Grosset & Dunlap) [End paper map, board, and title page drawings]
- Canada: Tomorrow's Giant (1957) by Bruce Hutchison (Oxford University Press) [maps]
- Constantinople; birth of an empire (1957) by Harold Lamb [2 maps]
- The Singing Wilderness (1957) by Sigurd F. Olson
- William Diamond's Drum (1959) [reprinted as Lexington and Concord, 1963] by Arthur B. Tourtellot [8 maps]
- Around the World in 2,000 Pictures (1959), ed. by A. Milton Runyon and Vilma F. Bergane (Doubleday) [20 maps]
- The Long Death: The Last Days of the Plains Indians (1964) by Ralph K. Andrist (21 maps)
- The Washing of the Spears (1965) by Donald R. Morris (Jonathan Cape) [maps]
- The Habsburgs (1966) by Dorothy Gies McGuigan (Doubleday)
- Asimov's Guide to the Bible (1967, 1969) by Isaac Asimov
- Stalin and His Generals: Soviet Military Memoirs of World War II (1969) by Seweryn Bailer (Pegasus) [maps]
- The Last of the Bush Pilots (1969) by Harmon "Bud" Helmericks [maps]
- Asimov's Guide to Shakespeare (1970) by Isaac Asimov
- Great Cities of the Ancient World (1972) by L. Sprague de Camp (Doubleday)
- The Mexican War 1846–47 (1974) by K. Jack Bauer, University of Nebraska Press
- Shardik (1974), by Richard Adams [map]
- The Clan of the Cave Bear (1980) by Jean M. Auel
- Infamy: Pearl Harbor and its Aftermath (1982) by John Toland (Doubleday) [maps]
- The Image of War: 1861–1865 (1981–84), edited by William C. Davis (Doubleday)
- "A Diary of Battle: The Personal Journals of Colonel Charles S. Wainwright, 1861–1865" (1998), edited by, Allan Nevins Da Capo Press
