= Chanterelle (disambiguation) =

Chanterelle is the common name of several species of edible mushroom.

Chanterelle may also refer to:

- Chanterelle, Cantal, a commune of Cantal département, southwest France
- Chanterelle, Les Anglais, Haiti, a rural settlement in the Chardonnières Arrondissement
- Chanterelle (Hollyoaks), a fictional character of the British television series Hollyoaks
- Chanterelle (New York City restaurant), US
- Chanterelle, the single top course on a lute.
- Chanterelle, the melody string on a hurdy gurdy
- Chanterelle (also known as Pop Diva), a fictional Toad character from the 2000 game Paper Mario
- Chanterelle, a purple Toad character very briefly seen in The Super Mario Bros. Movie
- Chanterelle, the original alias of the Buffyverse character Anne Steele
