= Maia (novel) =

1984 fantasy novel by Richard Adams

- First edition cover
- Author: Richard Adams
- Language: English
- Series: Beklan Empire
- Genre: Fantasy, Romance
- Publisher: Viking Press
- Publication date: 1984
- Publication place: United Kingdom
- Media type: Print (hardback & paperback)
- ISBN: 0-14-006476-1
- OCLC: 13397594
- Preceded by: Shardik

Maia is a fantasy novel by Richard Adams, published in 1984. It is set in the Beklan Empire, the fictional world of Adams's 1974 novel Shardik, to which it stands as a loose prequel, taking place a few years earlier.

== Plot summary ==
=== Part 1: The Peasant ===
Maia, at 15, lives in the Beklan Empire's province of Tonilda with her mother, Morca, her three younger sisters, and her stepfather, Tharrin. Their small, poor farm is on the edge of Lake Serrelind, and Maia tends to shirk her chores by swimming in the lake.

Tharrin secretly seduces Maia. When Morca discovers the affair, she sells Maia to a slave dealer Lalloc. Maia is almost raped by one of his employees, but is saved by Occula, a black slave girl. Maia and Occula become very good friends and even lovers. They are sent to the city of Bekla.

Occula relates her past: her father, a jewel-merchant, brought her across the desert to Bekla. They were received by the noblewoman Fornis. She had Occula's father murdered and his emeralds incorporated into the Sacred Queen's crown. Occula was sold as a slave.

Adams outlines Bekla's political situation in several chapters that bypass Maia. The "Leopard" faction led by the High Baron Durakkon, Fornis (now the Sacred Queen), the Lord General Kembri, and the High Counsellor Sencho came to power by ceding Suba, a western province, to the neighbouring kingdom of Terekenalt. They legalised slavery, and the capital's finances are now heavily based on taxation of it. Pockets of rebellion have sprung up around the empire.

=== Part 2: The Slave-Girl ===
Sencho buys both Maia and Occula as "bed-slaves". Terebinthia, the woman in charge of Sencho's household, supervises and trains them. At intervals, a peddler named Zirek visits and exchanges cryptic conversations with Occula.

Beautiful and fun-loving, Maia shows promise of going far, and finds some professional satisfaction in providing Sencho's decadent pleasures. To her surprise, she even enjoys the spectacle when a fellow bed-slave, the tempestuous Meris, is whipped and sold for dereliction of duty.

Terebinthia rents out the girls to other rich and powerful men. Using this means of contact, Lord General Kembri secretly enlists Maia and Occula as agents and charges Maia with gaining the trust of Bayub-Otal, the dispossessed heir to Suba and a potential ally of the rebels. Bayub-Otal is the son of the baron of a neighbouring province and a dancer nicknamed "Nokomis" ("dragonfly").

When Sencho becomes drastically ill, he comes to depend almost solely on Occula's intense caretaking. During a garden party, Occula lures Sencho out of sight and signals her rebel confederates, Zirek and Meris, to stab Sencho to death.

Maia and Occula are imprisoned on suspicion of colluding in Sencho's murder. Queen Fornis takes Maia into her household. As Maia fails to satisfy her sexual needs, Fornis gives her to Kembri; Maia seizes on this chance to interest the queen in Occula, hoping to save her friend from execution.

Kembri sends Maia to Bayub-Otal with a cover story of having escaped. Bayub-Otal takes her with him as he secretly makes his way back to Suba. Maia learns that one reason for his extraordinary standoffish respect for her is that she looks (and dances) like his dead mother, Nokomis, who is still revered throughout the province. Bayub-Otal hopes to use the resemblance to rally Suban patriotism on behalf of an alliance with Terekenalt.

At the rallying site, Maia falls passionately in love with the handsome young Zen-Kurel, an officer of Terekenalt. Zen-Kurel accepts her invitation to bed, but leaves quickly to take part in a surprise attack scheduled for that very night. The River Valderra, the boundary between the two countries, is thought to be uncrossably swift and rocky, but the Terekenalters plan to ford it with heavy ropes and strong men, thus surprising the detachment of Tonildan soldiers guarding the other side.

In hopes of saving her fellow Tonildans' lives as well as her lover's, Maia swims the river. Despite serious wounds, she warns the Beklan commander and thwarts the invasion.

=== Part 3: The Serrelinda ===
Maia returns to Bekla, freed and celebrated. She gains an informal title as the "Serrelinda" after Lake Serrelind. Hoping to reunite with Zen-Kurel, she takes no lovers, despite expectations that she will find a rich husband or become an expensive courtesan. Her popularity and single status bring her under threat from Fornis; since the Sacred Queen is chosen periodically by popular acclaim, Maia is an obvious rival despite not wanting the crown.

Maia sees her stepfather, Tharrin, dragged into Bekla as a rebel informant. He is condemned to be sacrificed. Maia does her best to free him, and he reveals to her that her real mother was not Morca but a pregnant girl who had fled to Morca's cottage and died there in childbirth; Maia deduces she is the daughter of Nokomis' younger sister and therefore a Suban.

Fornis causes Tharrin's death. Maia makes a desperate attempt to kill Fornis, but is thwarted by Occula, who was indeed inducted into the queen's household. Occula intends to take revenge on Fornis when the time is right; meanwhile she is performing the sort of sado-masochistic services of which Maia had been incapable.

As civil war breaks out in Bekla, Maia learns that Bayub-Otal and Zen-Kurel have been brought there as prisoners. In danger of Fornis' murderous fury, Maia frees the two men, and with them and Zirek and Meris (who have been hiding since assassinating Sencho), she flees Bekla.

=== Part 4: The Suban ===
The former prisoners are bitterly angry at Maia for betraying them at the Valderra, which she had idealistically considered an attempt to save their lives. Nevertheless, they agree to return with her to Suba or Terekenalt.

Maia and her companions travel for a time with rebel freebooters. Meris, always a troublemaker, gets herself killed by one of them. Maia gradually regains Zen-Kurel's and Bayub-Otal's trust by her sincere efforts to help them. After an arduous boat escape from the Beklan Empire to Terekenalt, Bayub-Otal is killed and Maia receives a marriage proposal from the man she loves most.

Two years later, Maia (with her little son) visits the capital of her new country and by chance meets Occula. Occula describes how she killed Fornis, aided by supernatural forces, and how the rebels overthrew the Leopards' regime.

The story ends with Maia refusing Occula's plea to go back to Bekla; she would rather help Zen-Kurel and his father manage their farm.

== Invented terms ==
Much as Adams had invented words of the Lapine language for the rabbits of Watership Down, he employs some "Beklan" vocabulary for honorifics, natural objects, and sexual terms; the last "allows adults to leave the book within reach of children." Some are also used in Shardik.

== Reception ==
The New York Times reviewer considered the book far better than Shardik, especially in prose style. She called it "a sexy, swashbuckling, and hugely long romp," and said it resembled his previous novels in "its mood of personal exorcism and self-indulgence." She praised Adams's inventive fantasy world and said the plot was "just so much 'Star Wars' and lots of fun." However, she said that what appeared to be an attempt at feminist sensibility was marred by "something basically wrongheaded about his female characters," noting that Occula, despite her spirituality, ends up being satisfied as a rich man's mistress, and that Maia, despite the reader's expectation that she will have some kind of apotheosis, ends up on a farm something like where she started. "What is it," she asks, "that Mr. Adams wishes us to make of it all?"

The New Yorker quipped that though Maia's career as a Playboy Bunny was reminiscent of Watership Down, she seemed more like a fish, and her swimming "changes the course of much more than her career". It said "Mr. Adams's artistry distinguishes his work from those didactic fantasies which border on science fiction"; instead the aim was entertainment, as shown in the elaborate settings, and the reader has no reason to put the book down.
