= The Girl in a Swing (1988 film) =

1988 film

- Theatrical release poster
- Directed by: Gordon Hessler
- Screenplay by: Gordon Hessler
- Based on: The Girl in a Swing by Richard Adams
- Produced by: Just Betzer; Benni Korzen
- Starring: Meg Tilly; Rupert Frazer; Elspet Gray; Nicholas Le Prevost
- Cinematography: Claus Loof
- Edited by: Robert Gordon
- Music by: Carl Davis
- Distributed by: Millimeter Films
- Release dates: December 1, 1988 (California); September 29, 1989 (USA)
- Running time: 119 minutes
- Country: United States
- Language: English
- Box office: $747,013

The Girl in a Swing is a 1988 American supernatural erotic drama film directed by Gordon Hessler and starring Meg Tilly, Rupert Frazer, Nicholas Le Prevost, and Elspet Gray. Based on the 1980 novel The Girl in a Swing by Richard Adams, the film is about an English antique dealer who travels to Copenhagen where he meets and falls in love with a mysterious German-born secretary, whom he marries. Knowing nothing about her family or background, he soon discovers a darker side to his new bride.

== Plot ==
Alan Desland is an English antique dealer who specializes in ceramics. A solitary man, he is a bachelor with no romantic ties. On a business trip to Copenhagen, he hires a German-born secretary, Karin Foster fluent in English, Danish, and German. Alan's attraction to Karin is immediate, and he falls deeply in love with her. Karin displays a quiet sensitivity (crying during a classical concert) alongside dispassionate coldness (breaking the neck of an injured seagull). When Alan makes an offhand comment that he'd have trouble marrying a woman with a child she becomes clearly upset. Before leaving Copenhagen, Karin expresses her love for Alan, and they agree to marry.

Alan's mother in England expresses concern they know little about Karin's background. Alan begins to notice Karin's strange behavior, such as fright of the sound of children and fearfulness of the dark. Karin refuses to marry in a church, and on a holiday to the United States they wed in a civil ceremony in Florida. While swimming in a lake on their honeymoon, Karin sees a body beneath the water that Alan identifies as a log.

Returning to England, she charms his social circle during discussions of philosophy and religion. Alan is troubled when he asks his best friend, a vicar, if all things can be forgiven. Karin wins a rare statuette of a girl in a swing at auction which, Alan authenticates as valued over £200,000. The impotence he experienced on their wedding night gives way to unbridled sexuality. In conversations with Alan and the vicar, Karin explores the connection between spiritual love and physical love, which she believes is absent in Christianity but embraced by pagan cults.

Alan's joy at hearing of Karin's pregnancy is offset by strange events and apparitions. He has visions of a green tortoise toy and they both hear a child's voice on the phone. After deciding to receive Holy Communion, Karin is disturbed by the vicar's sermon on the commandment against killing. At the communion railing, she takes the eucharist in her hand, but does not receive it, and collapses. Alan's reassurance that whatever's past is past, prompts Karin to reply "Nothing is past."

Alan and his assistant both hear a child crying in the garden and find a doll face down in the water fountain. The assistant leaves, and Alan shuts all the doors and windows, and closes the drapes, but the cries continue in the garden during a violent storm. Alan sees the green tortoise toy again. After the storm Karin asks Alan to take her away. Before leaving he discovers a receipt for a green tortoise toy, and concludes she bought it for a daughter predating their marriage, surmising she killed the girl out of fear Alan would reject her with a child. Realizing the damage caused by his "careless words" Alan cries out, "May God have mercy." They drive to the beach, where she walks into the surf, pours water over her head in a gesture of baptism, and asks Alan if he knows what she did. She takes her clothes off, hands him her wedding ring, and they make love on the beach. As the waves roll over them, she faints in his arms.

At the hospital, Alan watches over her, hearing her say in German, "I had no pity." The next day he's told she died during the night. The doctor confirms she had an ectopic pregnancy, and that she had previously given birth. At an inquest hearing Alan sees an apparition of Karin in a hooded cloak at the back of the courtroom and breaks down in tears. Haunted by his careless words, Alan understands that his "need for a tidy life" resulted in the tragedy. When he returns home, he hears Karin in the garden, and walks out to find her on the swing.

== Cast ==
- Meg Tilly as Karin
- Rupert Frazer as Alan
- Nicholas Le Prevost as The Vicar
- Elspet Gray as Mrs. Desland
- Lynsey Baxter as Barbara
- Jean Boht as Mrs. Taswell
- Hanne Borchsenius as Jytte Borgen
- Ljuba Castot as Child in Water
- Helen Cherry as Lady Alice
- Mogens Dalsgaard as Concert Pianist
- Su Elliot as Nurse
- June Ellis as Lady at Auction
- Patrick Godfrey as Coroner
- Lorna Heilbron as Flick
- Ebbe Langberg as Per Simonsen
- Preston Lockwood as Man at Sothebys
- Leonard Maguire as Dr. Frazer
- William 'Duke' Meeks as Mr. Steinberg
- Michael Melia as Policeman 1
- Trine Michelsen as Receptionist
- Hilary Minster as Joe
- Klaus Pagh as Man at La Cocotte
- Jan Petersen as Chef at La Cocotte
- Martin Selway as Policeman 2
- Claire Shepherd as Angela
- Axel Strøbye as Jarl Borgen
- Sophie Thursfield as Deirdre
- Ralph Wade as Auctioneer

== Production ==
=== Development ===
Gordon Hessler first heard about the project while in Yugoslavia directing The Misfit Brigade for producer Just Betzer who owned the rights to the Richard Adams novel The Girl in a Swing. Betzer offered Hessler the opportunity to direct and Hessler was so enthused he also agreed to write the screenplay as well as he felt the existing script deviated too far from the novel. In order to maintain the integrity of the source novel, Hessler worked very closely with Adams in an unofficial capacity during the writing process giving Hessler advice and insight on how to translate the page to screen. With Adams' blessing, Hessler deviated slightly from the books ending as Hessler didn't believe they could adequately delve into the substance of the books final chapters effectively within the context of a film.

=== Filming ===
The film was shot in Denmark, England and Florida.

=== Post-production ===
After screening Hessler's directors cut which Adams loved, the film's distributor J&M Entertainment felt the film was too long and ordered Hessler cut the film down. One further change requested by J&M was that the ending spell out explicitly Karin's guilty secret, in contrast to the book which only gave a subtle implication. Further cuts were ordered by the U.S. distributor Miramax which sent Hessler a list of eight scenes they wanted removed from the film. While most of the Miramax cuts removed brief scenes and bits of dialogue that help foreshadow later events, a more damaging removal was the opening sequence of Alan following an unseen girl’s voice to the swing, setting up the tale of his supernatural beguilement. As a result of the cuts, Meg Tilly who plays Karin in the film, refused to promote it upon release. Following its theatrical run, Hessler tried to convince Miramax to release the original version on home video by promoting it as the "uncut version", Miramax instead added narration by Rupert Frazer that voiced the inner thoughts of his character, Alan, which was seen as forced and unnatural while also revealing the nature of the mystery within the first 10 minutes.

== Reception ==
=== Box office ===
The Girl in a Swing earned $747,013 gross in the United States.

=== Critical response ===
The film received mixed reviews. In a review in the Chicago Sun-Times, Roger Ebert gave The Girl in a Swing two and a half stars, writing, "I would have appreciated some kind of resolution to the story—instead of the confusion into which it eventually disappears." Ebert singled out Tilly's performance as noteworthy, "If the movie is disappointing, it is not uninteresting. This is Tilly's second role recently as a mesmerizing woman—after the underrated Masquerade—and she creates a genuinely original performance, a woman sometimes dreamy, sometimes intense, and always in pain. It's a performance so good it deserves a better movie."

In her review in AllRovi, Linda Rasmussen wrote, "The film is not entirely successful due to the leisurely direction of Gordon Hessler and the lack of pace needed to create genuine suspense. But despite this flaw, the sensitive performance of Meg Tilly makes the film well worth watching and is a haunting psychological exploration of obsession, passion and guilt."
