= Five Plays =

Book by Lord Dunsany (1914)

- First US edition
- Author: Lord Dunsany
- Language: English
- Genre: Fantasy plays
- Publisher: Grant Richards (UK); Mitchell Kennerley (US)
- Publication date: 1914
- Publication place: United Kingdom
- Media type: Print (hardback)
- Preceded by: The Book of Wonder
- Followed by: Fifty-One Tales

Five Plays is the eighth book by Anglo-Irish fantasy writer Lord Dunsany, considered a major influence on the work of J. R. R. Tolkien, H. P. Lovecraft, Ursula K. Le Guin and others. It was first published in hardcover by Grant Richards in February 1914, and has been reprinted a number of times since.

The book is actually Dunsany's sixth major work, two of his preceding books having been chapbooks or selections from his other works.

In contrast to most of Dunsany's other early books, Five Plays is a collection of dramatic works, the first of several such collections. All of the included plays were performed many times. The book also became a "set text" in some American schools, resulting in Five Plays becoming widely read.

== Contents ==
- "The Gods of the Mountain"
- "The Golden Doom"
- "King Argimēnēs and the Unknown Warrior"
- "The Glittering Gate"
- "The Lost Silk Hat"

== Reception ==
Darrell Schweitzer described "King Argimēnēs and the Unknown Warrior" as "Mostly action, wit, and pagentry. It is entertaining, but not earthshattering." He described "The Gods of the Mountain" as being "filled with clever, sometimes terrifying touches". But Schweitzer criticized the climax when the titular gods appeared on the stage, saying audiences would see them as simply actors in makeup, and not looking like supernatural beings. Schweitzer also wrote that "The Golden Doom" was "entertaining to read."

== Influence ==
- Fletcher Pratt's 1948 fantasy novel The Well of the Unicorn was written as a sequel to Dunsany's play "King Argimēnēs and the Unknown Warrior".
