= The Well of the Unicorn =

1948 novel by Fletcher Pratt

- Dust-cover of the first edition of The Well of the Unicorn
- Author: George U. Fletcher (Fletcher Pratt)
- Illustrator: Rafael Palacios
- Cover artist: Rafael Palacios
- Language: English
- Genre: Fantasy novel
- Publisher: William Sloane Associates
- Publication date: 1948
- Publication place: United States
- Media type: Print (Hardcover)
- Pages: 338 pp

The Well of the Unicorn is a fantasy novel by the American writer Fletcher Pratt. It was first published in 1948, under the pseudonym George U. Fletcher, in hardcover by William Sloane Associates. All later editions have appeared under the author's actual name with the exception of the facsimile reprint issued by Garland Publishing in 1975 for its Garland Library of Science Fiction series. The novel was first issued in paperback in 1967 by Lancer Books, which reprinted it in 1968; subsequent paperback editions were issued by Ballantine Books. The first Ballantine edition was in May 1976, and was reprinted three times, in 1979, 1980, and 1995. The most recent edition was a trade paperback in the Fantasy Masterworks series from Gollancz in 2001. The book has also been translated into German, and into Russian in 1992.

The Well of the Unicorn has been described as a "swordplay and sorcery" novel.

== Influences ==
L. Sprague de Camp wrote that Pratt set The Well of the Unicorn in the fictional world of Lord Dunsany's play King Argimēnēs and the Unknown Warrior. De Camp added that Pratt had also cited The Worm Ouroboros by E. R. Eddison, The Well at the World's End by William Morris, and the historical novels of Naomi Mitchison as influences on The Well of the Unicorn.

== Plot ==
The land of Dalarna is under the heel of the Vulkings, whose heavy taxation is forcing the Dalecarl yeomen out of their holdings. The protagonist, Airar Alvarson, is one of the dispossessed. On the advice of his mentor, the magician Meliboë, he joins the underground Iron Ring resistance, only to face defeat and failure. Captured and enslaved by the free fishers on the Gentebbi Islands, he goes through a series of adventures in which he gradually rises from a homeless fugitive to a great war leader.

During his quest, Airar gives much thought to the issues of honor, war, justice and government. He finds admirable qualities even in his enemies, and problematic ones in some of his allies. Always questioning where the right lies and what principles should guide his course, he feels his way to his goals as best he can. He finds magic a poor tool for defeating enemies or winning battles, as the small enchantments of which he is capable make him ill and gain him little. The great Empire across the sea, to which all parties pay at least a nominal fealty, seems to offer at least a symbolic solution; it guards the legendary Well of the Unicorn, which brings peace to those who drink from it. But its panacea is deceptive; those who do drink tend to find the peace so gained offset by new difficulties. The long, hard road of forging armies, building alliances, and waging war, without any mystical shortcuts, proves the only effectual path.

At the end of the novel, with the assistance of the Star-Captains of Carrhoene, Airar has succeeded in overthrowing the Vulkings and freeing Dalarna, and has won the emperor's daughter as his bride to boot. But it seems he will have no rest, as word comes that the heathens of Dzik have invaded the isles of his allies, the free fishers. When his wife urges him to drink of the Well with the invaders, he declines such facile solutions, countering that "There is no peace but that interior to us."

== Setting ==
According to critic Henry Wessells, the Dalarna of the novel "closely parallels medieval Denmark and ... much of [its] non-fictional history can be found in The Third King (1950), Pratt's study of 14th-century King Valdemar IV Atterdag.

== Reception ==
The novel received favorable reviews, including by Orville Prescott and Alice S. Morris in The New York Times (January 9, 1948, and February 29, 1948, respectively), Paul Jordan-Smith in the Los Angeles Times (January 18, 1948, and Edward Wagenknecht in the Chicago Daily Tribune (February 22, 1948).

Prescott viewed the book as reminiscent of Austin Tappan Wright's Islandia and E. R. Eddison's The Worm Ouroboros and Mistress of Mistresses, though not "in a class with them." He felt the author "quite wonderful [in] creating a world of his own and competent enough [in] telling a story of heroic action" but "no hand at characterization," with his characters "only picturesque shadows." He also thought the novel's "allegorical significance" weak, with the result that it "starts out superbly, trumpets blaring and banners flying," but "peters out sadly." In regard to style, he was pleased by "some of its archaisms" and found "some of its stiff rhythms ... flavorsome," but thought "the over-all effect ... pedantic and a bit wearisome."

To Morris, in contrast, the book was a tour de force. She found "real pleasure and power" in "the enormous romantic adventure of the story," stating the author had "pinned down [his] strange country ... with brilliant exactness," with his "accurate archaisms ... giving a rare and racy flavor to his created world."

Jordan-Smith noted that the novel did "not conform to the conventions of the period [but] deserve[s] special attention." Comparing it to the fantasies of Cabell and Eddison, he called it "a heroic yarn, crowded with both magic and lusty action; but the thoughtful reader will discover that he is never far away from the problem that gnaws at his own vitals."

Wagenknecht called the novel a "brilliantly written book" and "a straightforward, coherent narrative of exciting adventure" with "[f]or dressing ... love in all its manifestations from lust to glory." He too compared it to the works of Cabell and Eddison, as well as Lord Dunsany, "to whom, indeed, it is somewhat indebted" (an allusion to Pratt's acknowledged adoption of the setting of Dunsany's play King Argimenes and the Unknown Warrior).

L. Sprague de Camp praised the novel as not merely "a colorful and fast-moving adventure-fantasy," but also an exploration of "the philosophy of government: how can men be organized to fight for their freedom without irretrievably losing that freedom in the process."

The book was also reviewed in Fantasy Book, 1948, The Arkham Sampler, Spring 1948, Lester del Rey in If, November 1969, Mary H. Schaub in Locus, November 21, 1969, del Rey again in Worlds of Fantasy, Winter 1970, Stuart David Schiff in Whispers, December 1975, Alan Winston in Delap's F & SF Review, December 1976, Orson Scott Card in Destinies, Spring 1980, and Henry Wessells in The Magazine of Fantasy & Science Fiction, December 1999.

Wessells called the novel "anything but dry: Pratt's characters (and their sex lives) are very different from Tolkien's rather idealized world." His pronouncement is that it "is well worth reading in any form."

Even thirty years after it was published, Poul Anderson singled out The Well of the Unicorn as a fantasy novel that handled politics "superbly well," contrasting it with what he viewed as a rising tide of lazily-written, "thud-and-blunder" stories. Science fiction editor and critic David Pringle, writing in 1988, rated it as one of the hundred best fantasy novels.
