= Great Cities of the Ancient World =

1972 history book by L. Sprague de Camp

- Dust-jacket for Great Cities of the Ancient World
- Author: L. Sprague de Camp
- Illustrator: Rafael Palacios; Roy G. Krenkel
- Cover artist: L. Sprague de Camp
- Language: English
- Subject: Ethnology, History and Geography
- Publisher: Doubleday
- Publication date: 1972
- Publication place: United States
- Media type: Print (Hardback)
- Pages: xv, 510
- ISBN: 0-385-09187-7

Great Cities of the Ancient World is a history book by American writer and essayist L. Sprague de Camp, published by Doubleday in 1972. It was reissued by Dorset Press in 1990. It has also been translated into German.

== Content ==
The work is a study of the ethnology, history, geography, and everyday life of fourteen famous ancient capital cities; Thebes, Jerusalem, Nineveh, Tyre, Babylon, Memphis, Athens, Syracuse, Carthage, Alexandria, Anurâdhapura, Rome, Pâṭaliputra, and Constantinople. The narrative is enlivened by personal observation, the author having personally traveled to each of the sites treated. New World sites are not treated.

The author's treatment of Athens is typical of the rest. He starts the book off with a narrative of daily life in the city in 433/432 BC, the narrative following several slaves just after they wake up and walk to work conversing through busy polluted streets and hear a herald summon citizens to the assembly. After this dramatic entrance, he dives into a survey of Athenian history. On reaching the fifth century he diverts his attention to the city walls and Themistocles. The treatment of the Peloponnesian War stresses the contrast between Sparta and Athens, with the obligatory quote from the Funeral Oration and a long passage from Thucydides' reflections of the moral damage done by the war. As Athens' political power wanes in the fourth century he emphasizes the nature of the Polis and developments in art and literature.

== Reception ==
John E. Stambaugh stated "[t]he book is full of interesting digressions: travel reminiscences, a marvelously malicious account of Israelite history, a sketch history of archaeology in Iraq. Throughout, de Camp exhibits skepticism about the sincerity of much Judaeo-Christian morality, interest in the technological and linguistic aspects of the civilizations discussed, determination to combat the notion that 'during the golden age of Greece... the Greeks were the only people in the world who were really alive,' and eagerness to draw modern parallels." He notes that it "contains a map and an 'imaginative sketch' for most of the cities, and many photographs: these are of disparate quality, and few of them are helpful in suggesting how these cities really looked. There is no general map. The notes are mostly devoted to variant spellings of names; documentation of facts and interpretations is uneven. The life of the ancient cities is conveyed through quotations from ancient authors and from the modern accounts: on Carthage, for instance, de camp quotes his own The Arrows of Hercules and Flaubert's Salammbo." Summing up, Stambaugh tells the reader "A beginner, then, should not count on finding here the current state of scholarly opinion, but he will not be seriously misled by de Camp's treatment. A lively encounter with a variety of ancient civilizations is highly desirable, and this book will certainly set a tone of enthusiasm and verve in the student's perception of the ancient world."
