= Crusade in Europe =

1948 autobiography by Dwight D. Eisenhower and its television adaptation

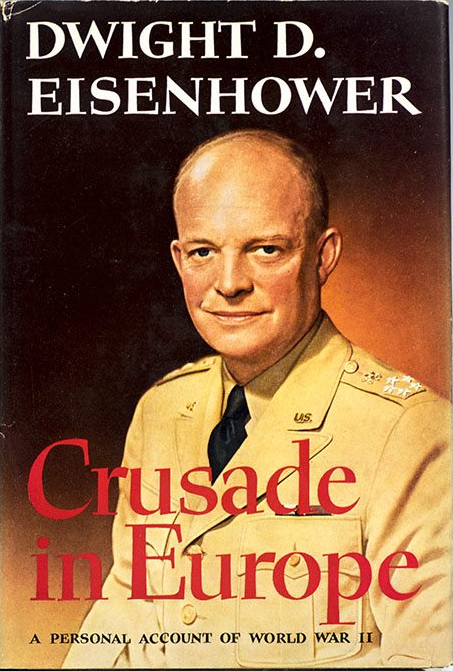
- First US edition
- Author: Dwight D. Eisenhower
- Subject: European Theater during World War II
- Genre: Autobiography
- Publisher: Doubleday (US); Heinemann (UK)
- Publication date: 1948
- Pages: xiv, 559 pages
- ISBN: 9780801856686
- OCLC: 394251
- Dewey Decimal: 940.541
- LC Class: D743.E35 1948

Crusade in Europe is a book of wartime memoirs by General Dwight D. Eisenhower published by Doubleday in 1948. Maps were provided by Rafael Palacios.

Crusade in Europe is a personal account by one of the senior military figures of World War II. It recounts his appointment by General George Marshall to plan the defense of the Philippines and continues to describe his appointment to, and execution of, the role of Supreme Allied Commander in Northern Europe.

The book was dictated by Eisenhower to Kenneth McCormick of Doubleday and Joseph Fels Barnes, former foreign editor of the New York Herald Tribune. It was revised by Eisenhower's aide Kevin McCann.

Eisenhower's profit on the book was substantially aided by an unprecedented ruling by the Treasury Department that Eisenhower was not a professional writer, but rather, was marketing the lifetime asset of his experiences, and thus only had to pay capital gains tax on his $635,000 advance rather than the much higher personal income tax rate. The ruling saved Eisenhower approximately $400,000.

== TV series ==
In 1948, Twentieth Century Fox obtained the exclusive rights to create a television series called Crusade in Europe, based on the newly published book. Produced as part of The March of Time, the 26-episode TV series showed World War II film footage from the US military and other sources, with a voice soundtrack based on a narration of the book. It aired from May 5 to October 27, 1949.

Crusade in Europe was the first extensive documentary series for television. Aired on ABC, the series received a Peabody Award and one of the first Emmy Awards (Best Public Service, Cultural or Educational Program).

The TV series was the subject of a U.S. copyright and trademark lawsuit filed in 1998. On appeal, in Dastar Corp. v. Twentieth Century Fox Film Corp., 539 U.S. 23 (2003), the Supreme Court of the United States ruled on a narrow issue involving the applicability of the Lanham Act to works in the public domain.

=== Home media ===
Crusade in Europe was released on Region 1 DVD October 4, 2011, by MPI Home Video.

As of August 2019, the series is also available to stream on Amazon Prime Video.
