= Rupert Frazer =

British actor

Rupert Frazer (born 12 March 1947) is a British actor.

== Career ==
His work in theatre includes performances at the Citizens Theatre, the Royal Court Theatre and the Royal National Theatre. In 1975, he played the title role in the first British stage production of Seneca's Thyestes. Other theatre roles include Ferdinand in The Tempest and Tamburlaine.

He appeared in Richard Attenborough's Gandhi in 1982. In Steven Spielberg's Empire of the Sun (1987) he plays the father of the protagonist Jim (Christian Bale).

Other roles include Philip Castallack in Penmarric (1979), Muller in Eye of the Needle (1981), Lionel Stephens in The Shooting Party (1985), Algernon Moncrieff (Algy) in a 1986 tv-production of Oscar Wilde's The Importance of Being Earnest, Alan Desland in The Girl in a Swing (1988), Lord Alexander Montford in The House of Eliott, Lord Drysdale in The Bank Job (2008), and Neville Chamberlain in Downton Abbey.

== Personal life ==
Frazer is married with three children.
