= Asimov's Guide to Shakespeare =

1970 book by Isaac Asimov

- Cover of the first edition
- Author: Isaac Asimov
- Illustrator: Rafael Palacios
- Language: English
- Subject: William Shakespeare
- Publisher: Doubleday
- Publication date: 1970
- Publication place: United States
- Media type: Print (hardcover)
- Pages: 843
- ISBN: 978-0-517-26825-4
- OCLC: 4498736

Asimov's Guide to Shakespeare (1970) by Isaac Asimov is a two-volume guide to the works of the English writer William Shakespeare. The numerous maps were drafted by the artist Rafael Palacios.

== Structure ==
The work gives a short guide to every Shakespeare play, as well as two epic poems. Asimov organizes the plays not in the usual way – as tragedies, comedies, and histories – but regionally, as follows:

- Greek
- Roman
- Italian
- English

The last two categories are treated broadly; "Italian" applies to neighbouring countries, and both Hamlet and Macbeth are listed with "The English Plays". Asimov gives a detailed justification for doing this.

Within each category, the plays are arranged according to internal (historical) chronology, making allowance for the several not based on actual events. Asimov notes how much is real history, and describes who the historical people were, where applicable. He traces those characters who appear in more than one play, and provides maps to explain key geographical elements.

== Asimov’s categories ==
It being "the most straightforwardly mythological" and tracing "farthest backward (if only dimly so) in history," Asimov includes in his regional categorisation, beginning with the "Greek", Shakespeare’s first narrative poem, Venus and Adonis (1593). He also includes Shakespeare’s second narrative poem, The Rape of Lucrece (1594), amongst the "Roman", it dealing with "the earliest event, the legendary fall of the Roman monarchy in 509 B.C.". More precise settings are indicated in superscript and parentheses.

=== Greek ===
1. Venus and Adonis
2. A Midsummer Night's Dream
3. The Two Noble Kinsmen
4. Troilus and Cressida^{(Troy)}
5. Timon of Athens
6. The Winter's Tale^{("Sicily and Bohemia")}
7. The Comedy of Errors^{(Ephesus)}
8. Pericles, Prince of Tyre ^{(Multiple locations including Tyre)}

=== Roman ===
1. The Rape of Lucrece
2. Coriolanus
3. Julius Caesar
4. Antony and Cleopatra^{(Rome and Alexandria)}
5. Titus Andronicus

=== Italian ===
1. Love's Labour's Lost^{(Navarre)}
2. The Taming of the Shrew
3. The Two Gentlemen of Verona
4. Romeo and Juliet
5. The Merchant of Venice
6. Much Ado About Nothing
7. As You Like It^{(France)}
8. Twelfth Night^{(Illyria)}
9. All's Well That Ends Well^{(Italy and France)}
10. Othello^{(Venice and Cyprus)}
11. Measure for Measure^{(Austria)}
12. The Tempest

=== English ===
1. King Lear
2. Cymbeline ^{(Pre-Roman Britain and Rome)}
3. Hamlet^{(Denmark)}
4. Macbeth^{(Scotland)}
5. King John
6. Henry IV, Part 1
7. Henry IV, Part 2
8. The Merry Wives of Windsor
9. Henry V
10. Henry VI, Part 1
11. Henry VI, Part 2
12. Henry VI, Part 3
13. Richard III
14. Henry VIII

== Publication data ==
Asimov's Guide to Shakespeare, vols I and II (1970), ISBN 978-0-517-26825-4. Gramercy Books.

Nearly 800 pages long plus an index, the work was originally published in two volumes; Greek, Roman and Italian in the first and 'The English Plays' in the second.

Asimov dedicated the work in memory of his father, Judah Asimov.

== See also ==
- Isaac Asimov bibliography (chronological)

== Sources ==
- Asimov, Isaac (1970). Asimov's Guide to Shakespeare, Volume One: The Greek, Roman, and Italian Plays (PDF). Doubleday. ISBN 978-0-517-26825-4.
- Asimov, Isaac (1970). Asimov's Guide to Shakespeare, Volume Two: The English Plays (PDF). Doubleday. ISBN 978-0-517-26825-4.
- Meserole, Harrison T.; Smith, John B. (1980). "Shakespeare: Annotated World Bibliography for 1979: Reference Works". Shakespeare Quarterly. 31 (4). Folger Shakespeare Library: 492–93. doi:10.1093/sq/31.4.468. eISSN 1538-3555. ISSN 0037-3222. JSTOR 2869590.
- Temes, Peter (15 March 2002). "100 Words a Minute, But Finally Stopped by AIDS". Forward. Archived from the original on 7 March 2003.
