= The Girl in a Swing (novel) =

1980 novel by Richard Adams

- First UK edition
- Author: Richard Adams
- Cover artist: George Haggar
- Language: English
- Genre: Suspense
- Publisher: Knopf (US), Allen Lane (UK)
- Publication date: 1980
- Publication place: United States; United Kingdom
- Media type: Print (Hardback & Paperback)
- Pages: 369
- ISBN: 978-0-394-51049-1
- OCLC: 5830060
- Dewey Decimal: 823/.914
- LC Class: PZ4.A2163 Gi 1980 PR6051.D345

The Girl in a Swing is a novel by British writer Richard Adams. It was first published in 1980. Subsequent editions changed the female lead's name from Käthe Geutner to Karin Forster, due to threat of a libel suit from someone with that name. It was adapted by director Gordon Hessler into a 1988 film starring Meg Tilly.

== Plot summary ==
Alan Desland is a socially awkward Englishman who makes a living as a collector and dealer of fine pottery including antique ceramics. On a business trip to Copenhagen, he falls headlong in love with a mysterious and beautiful young woman named Käthe (or in later editions, Karin), who does clerical work for him and one of his colleagues. After ten days of mutually infatuated courtship, he proposes marriage to her despite knowing nothing about her family or background. At one stage Alan glimpses her from afar with the figure of a girl who Käthe later tells him was the daughter of a friend. She accepts Alan's proposal on the condition that their wedding should take place as a civil ceremony in England, and appears to have no interest in inviting any relatives or friends of her own from Europe.

In the event, their marriage and honeymoon end up taking place near Gainesville, Florida, in the United States, thanks to the intervention of an American acquaintance. While swimming in a river together with Alan, Käthe is frightened by what seems to her the figure of a drowned girl, though Alan reassures her that it is only a log. Her playful sensuality overwhelms Alan, continuing to captivate him and their entire social circle after their return home to run his family's ceramics shop. Käthe discovers, at an auction, a valuable ceramic figurine of "The Girl in a Swing" – one of only three known such figurines – which promises to bring wealth to the couple. In a haunting episode in which Alan may or may not be in trance, he arrives home to find Käthe naked on the swing in the yard of their property, and as they make love on the lawn, undergoes a transcendent experience.

Alan's psychic senses (mostly latent since adolescence) begin to warn him that something has gone wrong. Troubling occurrences (including the sounds of water in the night, the sounds of a crying child in the garden, and the hinted supernatural nature of a large black Alsatian dog) contribute to Alan's sense of a fated outcome to Käthe's fears of some impending doom. Käthe, who has announced she may be pregnant, seeks succour from her unspecified anxieties by accompanying Alan to the communion service at church, but is unable to swallow the communion wafer and faints when about to drink the communion wine. Gradually the horror grows until after one haunted night, the couple flee their home.

Alan eventually learns that, unbeknown to him, Käthe had had a daughter when they met; out of fear that Alan would reject her (Käthe) if he learned of the daughter, Käthe had killed her daughter. In the end, Käthe dies of an ectopic pregnancy.

== Characters ==
- Alan Desland: an English ceramics dealer and collector. Until he meets Käthe/Karin, his personality is very reserved to the point of asexuality.
- Käthe/Karin: a young woman from Germany whom Alan meets in Copenhagen. In Adams' original manuscript, she was named Käthe Geutner, but almost all of the first editions with that name were withdrawn from print because of a libel suit by a real woman with the same name. In subsequent editions, her surname was variously changed to Forster or Wassermann; her first name was sometimes also changed to Karin.

== Sources ==
- Adams, Richard (1980). The Girl in a Swing. New York: Knopf. ISBN 978-0-394-51049-1.
