= Shardik =

1974 fantasy novel by Richard Adams

- First edition cover
- Author: Richard Adams
- Illustrator: Rafael Palacios (map)
- Cover artist: Martin White
- Language: English
- Series: Beklan Empire
- Genre: Fantasy novel
- Publisher: Allen Lane
- Publication date: 1974
- Publication place: England
- Media type: Print (Hardback & Paperback)
- Pages: 526 pp (first edition, hardback)
- ISBN: 0-380-50997-0 (first edition, hardback)
- OCLC: 1130141
- Followed by: Maia

Shardik is a 1974 fantasy novel by Richard Adams. Shardik is his second novel (after Watership Down 1972, followed by Nature Through the Seasons 1975), and the first of two novels set in the fictional Beklan Empire. The events revolve around the discovery, capture and military and symbolic uses made of an incredibly large bear, called "Lord Shardik" by those who subscribe to a set of religious beliefs in the novel.

== Plot ==
When a tremendous fire ravages a forest, a bear twice as tall as a man flees to the river island of Ortelga, and is found exhausted by Kelderek, a hunter who thinks the bear may be Lord Shardik, "the Power of God", returned to his worshippers. Kelderek shares his belief with the local barons and priestesses. The Ortelgans once ruled the Beklan Empire. Against the wishes of the Tuginda, the high priestess, a military campaign is launched to retake Bekla. The bear is sedated, caged, and carried to the campaign, awakening and breaking free in the middle of a battle which they are losing. Shardik's attack demoralises the enemy and the opposing army is routed.

Shardik's worship is restored to central prominence in Bekla with Kelderek as priest-king. Five years into his rule, Bekla remains at war and there is discontent, particularly over the Ortelgans' expansion of legal slavery. When the bear escapes and flees again, Kelderek alone follows in pursuit. The two of them stagger through the wilderness for a long time, both of them on the brink of starvation and madness, meeting many foes along the way. Kelderek loses both ability and desire to continue, having lost his faith. Finally reaching Zeray, a lawless town beyond the borders of civilisation, he re-encounters the Tuginda and Melathys, a former priestess of Shardik, and the two fall in love.

Kelderek is captured by Genshed, an unlicensed slave-trader with a large group of children, whom he delights in tormenting. Genshed is fleeing from insurrection forces who despise the slave trade, and many children do not survive the march. Genshed is on the point of killing Kelderek despite knowing his prisoner's value as the former ruler of Bekla, when the dying Shardik erupts from the woods. The bear attacks Genshed, mortally wounding him before collapsing dead in the river. Kelderek, his faith restored, returns to the town of Zeray with the children and is appointed its governor by Bekla's new rulers. Some years later, the town is now the home of so many orphans that children outnumber adults by two to one, and work in this society much like adults. Shardik's death is perceived as sacred and a sign that all children are to be valued. Kelderek and Melathys are married with two children of their own, beginning trade negotiations with an emissary from the distant kingdom of Zakalon.

== Characters ==
Shardik – An enormous bear more than twice as tall as a man, with huge curved claws longer than a man's head. Shardik first appears in the opening chapters, when a forest fire forces him out of the wild lands north of the River Telthearna onto the island of Ortelga. Unlike the animals in Adams' earlier book Watership Down, Shardik does not speak or appear to have conscious thought, and apart from the opening sequence the story is not told from his perspective.

Kelderek (also called Crendrik by non-Ortelgans) – The main protagonist, an Ortelgan hunter and later priest-king of the Beklan empire, and finally governor of Zeray. Often nicknamed Zenzuata ("Play-With-The-Children") as he seldom socialises with other people his age but instead prefers to play with the children. It is he who first sees the enormous bear, setting in motion the events which lead to the Ortelgans taking Bekla and himself being crowned king.

The Tuginda – High priestess of Ortelga, she opposes the capture of Shardik for the purposes of aiding the conquest of Bekla, and so is made a prisoner on the island of Quiso by Ta-Komininion (an act to which Kelderek is grudgingly complicit).

Melathys – A priestess second in authority to the Tuginda, who flees and abandons her position at the sight of Shardik but redeems herself later.

Bel-ka-Trazet – High Baron of the Ortelgans when Shardik is first discovered, and later ruler of the lawless outpost of Zeray. He is a pragmatic ruler and a rational man. He was disfigured by a bear when he was a young hunter.

Ta-Kominion – A charismatic young baron who usurps power from Bel-ka-Trazet and directs the campaign to take Bekla for the Ortelgans in its early stages and orders the Tuginda to be taken in chains when she disagrees with using Shardik.

Elleroth – Ban of Sarkid, in the southern province of Yelda, outwardly loyal to the Ortelgans, but working for the rebel general Santil-kè-Erketlis. His son is taken by Genshed as a slave, fuelling his resentment of Ortelgan rule.

Genshed – Sadistic child slaver who has Elleroth's son in his service.

== Setting ==
1974 map of Beklan Empire drawn by Rafael Palacios.

Shardik takes place in the Beklan Empire, which consists of twelve vassal provinces and independent domains organized around the central Beklan province, at the centre of which is the empire's capital, Bekla. The capital is typically controlled by factions from one of the provinces, and the outermost provinces continuously threaten to break free. The lingua franca of the empire is the Beklan language. The subdivisions are Bekla (the capital), Belishba, Chalcon, Gelt, Lapan, Kabin of the Waters, Ortelga, Paltesh, Tonilda, Ur-tah, Yelda, and Sarkid of the Sheaves.

== Related works ==
Adams later wrote the loose prequel Maia, a novel that takes place in and around Bekla about a dozen years earlier. Several characters from Shardik appear as minor characters in Maia, e.g. Melathys and Genshed.

== Influence ==
The bear Guardian in Stephen King's The Dark Tower series is named for this Shardik.

Jeff VanderMeer drew inspiration from Shardik when creating the character Mord, a giant biotech bear who dominates an unnamed city in VanderMeer's 2017 novel Borne.

== See also ==
- The Clan of the Cave Bear, a novel about a prehistoric people who have a cave bear and other animals as personal totems
