= Join the Cavalry =

Military song of the American Civil War

Join the Cavalry was a military song popular during the American Civil War. The verses detail various feats performed by Jeb Stuart's troopers, the cavalry arm of the Army of Northern Virginia, while the chorus urges the listener to "join the cavalry". Occasionally, the title is recorded as "Jine the Cavalry". The song was most common in Virginia.

"Jine the Cavalry!" was among Stuart’s favorite songs, and became the unofficial theme song of his Confederate cavalry corps. It recounts many of Stuart’s early exploits, including the daring "Ride around the Army of the Potomac" in the early summer of 1862, and the Confederate Cavalry raid on Chambersburg, PA in October 1862. One of Stuart’s men, Sam Sweeney, was an accomplished banjo player and often serenaded Stuart and his officers during the Gettysburg Campaign.
