= Richard Adams =

English writer (1920–2016)

Richard Adams FRSL
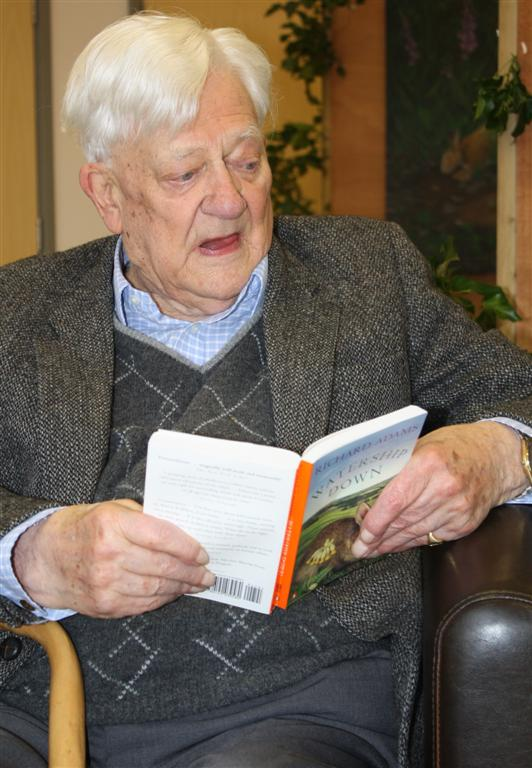
- Adams reads from Watership Down, 2008
- Born: Richard George Adams; 10 May 1920 (Note: While most sources give Adams's date of birth as 9 May 1920, his entry in the Oxford Dictionary of National Biography, citing his birth certificate, says he was born on 10 May, as does the 1939 England and Wales Register.); Newbury, Berkshire, England
- Died: 24 December 2016 (aged 96); Oxford, England
- Education: Worcester College, Oxford (BA, MA)
- Occupation: Novelist
- Spouse: Barbara Elizabeth Acland (m. 1949)
- Children: 2
- Writing career
- Period: 1972–2010
- Genres: Children's literature; adventure; fantasy
- Notable works: Watership Down; Shardik; The Plague Dogs; The Girl in a Swing
- Notable awards: Carnegie Medal 1972; Guardian Prize 1973

Richard George Adams (10 May 1920 – 24 December 2016) was an English novelist. He is best known for his debut novel Watership Down which achieved international acclaim. His other works included Maia, Shardik and The Plague Dogs. He studied Modern History at Worcester College, Oxford, before serving in the British Army during World War II. After completing his studies, he joined the British Civil Service. In 1974, two years after Watership Down was published, Adams became a full-time author.

== Early life and education ==
Richard Adams was born on 10 May 1920 in Newbury, Berkshire, the son of Lillian Rosa (née Button) and Evelyn George Beadon Adams, a doctor. He attended Horris Hill School from 1926 to 1933 and Bradfield College from 1933 to 1938. In 1938, he went to Worcester College, Oxford, to read Modern History. In July 1940, Adams was called up to join the British Army. He was commissioned into the Royal Army Service Corps and was selected for the Airborne Company, where he worked as a brigade liaison. He served in Palestine, Europe, and East Asia but saw no direct action against either the Germans or the Japanese.

After leaving the army in 1946, Adams returned to Worcester College to continue his studies for a further two years. He received a bachelor's degree in 1948, proceeding MA in 1953.

== Civil Service career ==
After graduating in 1948, Adams joined the Civil Service, rising to the rank of Assistant Secretary to the Ministry of Housing and Local Government, later part of the Department of the Environment. He began to write his own stories in his spare time, reading them to his children and later on, to his grandchildren.

== Writing career ==
Adams originally began telling the story that would become Watership Down to his two daughters on a car trip. They eventually insisted that he publish it as a book. He began writing in 1966, taking two years to complete it. In 1972, after four publishers and three writers' agencies turned down the manuscript, Rex Collings agreed to publish the work. The book gained international acclaim almost immediately for reinvigorating anthropomorphic fiction with naturalism.

Over the next few years Watership Down sold over a million copies worldwide. Adams won both of the most prestigious British children's book awards, one of six authors to do so: the Carnegie Medal and the Guardian Children's Fiction Prize. (Note: Alternatively, six authors have won the Carnegie Medal for their Guardian Prize–winning books. Professional librarians confer the Carnegie and select the winner from all British children's books. The Guardian newspaper's prize winner is selected by British children's writers, "peers" of the author who has not yet won it, for one children's (age 7+) or young-adult fiction book. Details regarding author and publisher nationality have varied.) In 1974, following publication of his second novel, Shardik, he left the Civil Service to become a full-time author. He was elected a Fellow of the Royal Society of Literature in 1975.

At one point, Adams served as writer-in-residence at the University of Florida and at Hollins University in Virginia. Adams was the recipient of the inaugural Whitchurch Arts Award for inspiration in January 2010, presented at the Watership Down pub in Freefolk, Hampshire. In 2015 he was awarded an honorary doctorate by the University of Winchester.

== Animal welfare ==
Adams was a strong advocate of animal welfare. In 1980, Adams served two years as president of the RSPCA. He resigned in 1982, commenting that the Society "seemed to be more concerned with each other than with the animals". Adams was involved with Cruelty Free International. He was also a patron of Animal Aid.

Besides campaigning against fur, Adams wrote The Plague Dogs to satirise animal experimentation (as well as government and the tabloid press). He also made a voyage through the Antarctic in the company of the ornithologist Ronald Lockley. Just before his 90th birthday, he wrote a new story for a charity book, Gentle Footprints, to raise funds for the Born Free Foundation.

== Personal life ==
In 1949, Adams married Barbara Elizabeth, daughter of RAF Squadron-Leader Edward Fox Dyke Acland, son of the barrister and judge Sir Reginald Brodie Dyke Acland, whose father, the scientist Henry Wentworth Dyke Acland (himself created a baronet of St Mary Magdalen, Oxford) descended from the Acland baronets of Columb John in Devon.

Until his death, Adams lived with his wife in Church Street, Whitchurch, Hampshire, within 10 miles (16 km) of his birthplace. Their daughters, to whom Adams originally related the tales that became Watership Down, are Juliet and Rosamond. Adams celebrated his 90th birthday in 2010 with a party at the White Hart in Whitchurch, where Sir George Young presented him with a painting by a local artist. Adams wrote a poetic piece celebrating his home of the past 28 years.

Adams died on 24 December 2016 at the age of 96 in Oxford, from complications of heart failure and a blood disorder.

== Works ==
- Watership Down (1972) ISBN 978-0-7432-7770-9
- Shardik (1974) ISBN 978-0-380-00516-1
- Nature Through the Seasons (1975) ISBN 978-0-7226-5007-3
- The Tyger Voyage (1976) ISBN 978-0-394-40796-8, with Nicola Bayley (reprinted 2013, David R. Godine, Publisher, ISBN 978-1-56792-491-6)
- The Plague Dogs (1977) ISBN 978-0-345-49402-3
- The Ship's Cat (1977, text of picture book illustrated by Alan Aldridge) ISBN 978-0-394-42334-0
- Nature Day and Night (1978) ISBN 0-7226-5359-X (with M. D. Hooper)
- The Girl in a Swing (1980) ISBN 978-0-7139-1407-8
- The Iron Wolf and Other Stories (1980), published in the US as The Unbroken Web: Stories and Fables. Color Illustrations by Yvonne Gilbert, b&w illustrations by Jennifer Campbell. ISBN 978-0-517-40375-4
- The Legend of Te Tuna (1982), Sylvester & Orphanos, ISBN 978-0-283-99393-0
- Voyage Through the Antarctic (1982 with Ronald Lockley), Allen Lane ISBN 0-7139-1396-7
- Maia (1984) ISBN 978-0-517-62993-2
- A Nature Diary (1985) ISBN 0-670-80105-4, ISBN 978-0-670-80105-3
- The Bureaucats (1985) ISBN 0-670-80120-8, ISBN 978-0-670-80120-6
- Traveller (1988) ISBN 978-0-394-57055-6
- The Day Gone By (autobiography) (1990) ISBN 978-0-679-40117-9
- Tales from Watership Down (collection of linked stories) (1996) ISBN 978-0-380-72934-0
- The Outlandish Knight (1999) ISBN 978-0-7278-7033-9
- Daniel (2006) ISBN 1-903110-37-8
- "Leopard Aware" in Gentle Footprints (2010) ISBN 978-1-907335-04-4
