= Anthropomorphism =

Attribution of human traits to non-human entities

Mickey Mouse, an anthropomorphic mouse and an American cartoon character co-created in 1928 by Walt Disney and Ub Iwerks, showing typical elements of anthropomorphism: bipedalism, human-like hands with opposable thumbs, human facial expressions, and wearing clothing.

Anthropomorphism is the ascribing of human personality, appearance, conduct, cognition, or other attributes to non-human entities, often including non-human animals. In fiction and folklore, it is specifically the endowing of non-human characters with human-like behaviors, speech, facial expressions, etc.; common examples include intelligent talking animals, talking trees, anthropomorphized food, and sentient toys.

As a general human tendency, anthropomorphism is considered innate to human psychology. Personification, which usually refers to a literary device, is the related attribution of human form and characteristics to non-animal organisms, inanimate objects, or abstract concepts such as nations, emotions, and natural forces like weather or the seasons. Both have ancient roots as storytelling and artistic devices, and most cultures have traditional fables with anthropomorphized animals as characters. People have also routinely attributed human emotions and behavioral traits to wild as well as domesticated animals.

== Etymology ==
Anthropomorphism and anthropomorphization derive from the verb form anthropomorphize, (Note: Possibly via French anthropomorphisme.) itself derived from the Greek ánthrōpos (ἄνθρωπος, lit. "human") and morphē (μορφή, "form"). It is first attested in 1753, originally in reference to the heresy of applying a human form to the Christian God. (Note: Anthropomorphism, among divines, the error of those who ascribe a human figure to the deity.)

== Examples in prehistory ==
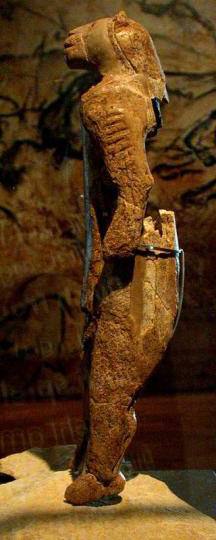
The 35,000 to 40,000 year-old Löwenmensch figurine

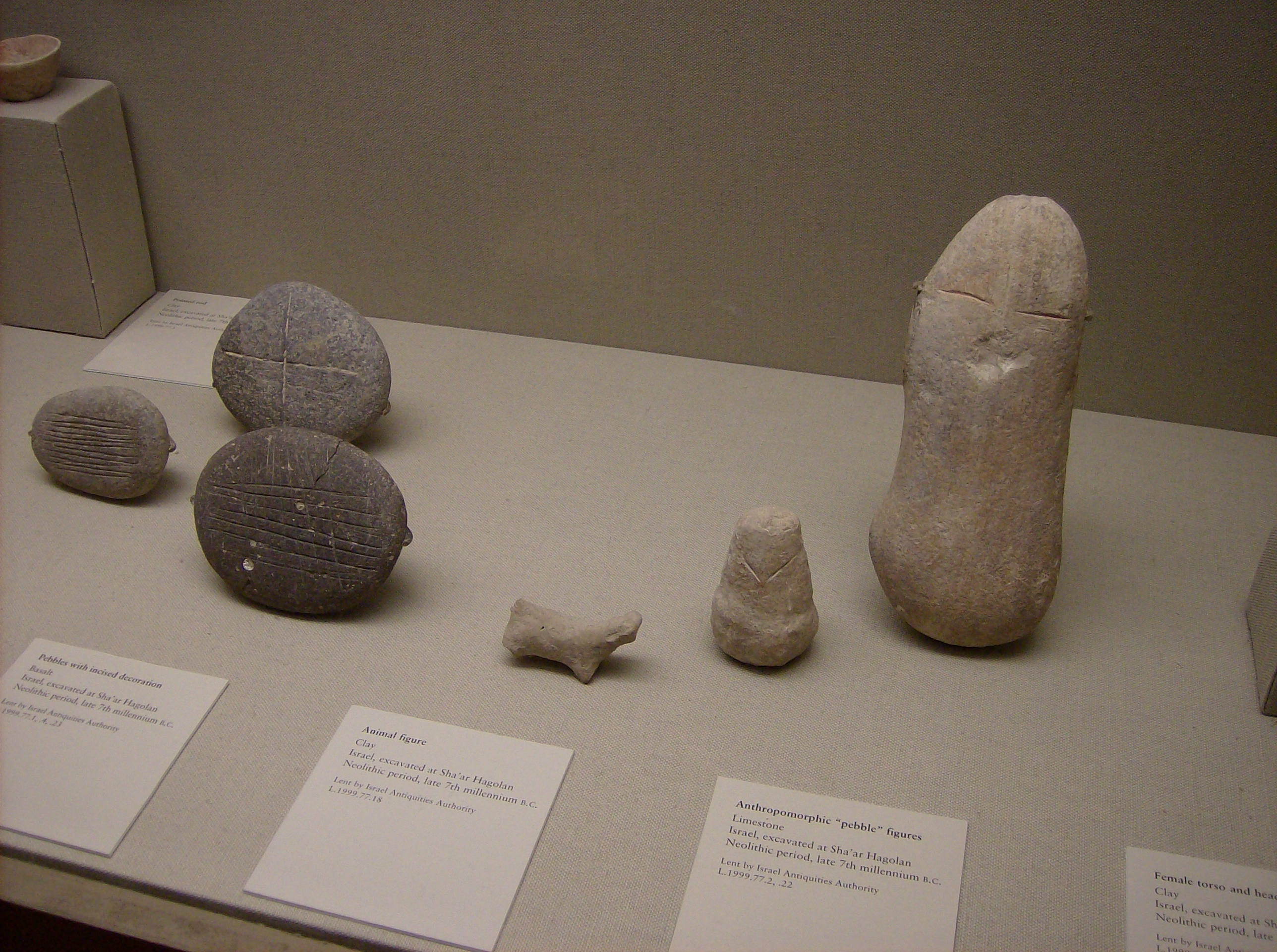
Anthropomorphic "pebble" figures from the 7th millennium BC

From the beginnings of human behavioral modernity in the Upper Paleolithic, about 40,000 years ago, examples of zoomorphic (animal-shaped) works of art occur that may represent the earliest known evidence of anthropomorphism. One of the oldest known is an ivory sculpture, the Löwenmensch figurine, Germany, a human-shaped figurine with the head of a lioness or lion, determined to be about 32,000 years old.

It is not possible to say what these prehistoric artworks represent. A more recent example is The Sorcerer, an enigmatic cave painting from the Trois-Frères Cave, Ariège, France: the figure's significance is unknown, but it is usually interpreted as some kind of great spirit or master of the animals. In either case there is an element of anthropomorphism.

This anthropomorphic art has been linked by archaeologist Steven Mithen with the emergence of more systematic hunting practices in the Upper Palaeolithic. He proposes that these are the product of a change in the architecture of the human mind, an increasing fluidity between the natural history and social intelligences, where anthropomorphism allowed hunters to identify empathetically with hunted animals and better predict their movements. (Note: In the New York Review of Books, Gardner opined that "I find most convincing Mithen's claim that human intelligence lies in the capacity to make connections: through using metaphors".)

== In religion and mythology ==
In religion and mythology, anthropomorphism is the perception of a divine being or beings in human form, or the recognition of human qualities in these beings.

Ancient mythologies frequently represented the divine as deities with human forms and qualities. They resemble human beings not only in appearance and personality; they exhibited many human behaviors that were used to explain natural phenomena, creation, and historical events. The deities fell in love, married, had children, fought battles, wielded weapons, and rode horses and chariots. They feasted on special foods, and sometimes required sacrifices of food, beverage, and sacred objects to be made by human beings. Some anthropomorphic deities represented specific human concepts, such as love, war, fertility, beauty, or the seasons. Anthropomorphic deities exhibited human qualities such as beauty, wisdom, and power, and sometimes human weaknesses such as greed, hatred, jealousy, and uncontrollable anger. Greek deities such as Zeus and Apollo often were depicted in human form exhibiting both commendable and despicable human traits. Anthropomorphism in this case is, more specifically, anthropotheism.

From the perspective of adherents to religions in which humans were created in the form of the divine, the phenomenon may be considered theomorphism, or the giving of divine qualities to humans.

Anthropomorphism has cropped up as a Christian heresy, particularly prominently with Audianism in third-century Syria, but also fourth-century Egypt and tenth-century Italy. This often was based on a literal interpretation of the Genesis creation myth: "So God created humankind in his image, in the image of God he created them; male and female he created them".

Hindus do not reject the concept of a deity in the abstract unmanifested, but note practical problems. The Bhagavad Gita, Chapter 12, Verse 5, states that it is much more difficult for people to focus on a deity that is unmanifested than one with form, remarking on the usage of anthropomorphic icons (murtis) that adherents can perceive with their senses.

=== Criticism ===
Some religions, scholars, and philosophers objected to anthropomorphic deities. The earliest known criticism was that of the Greek philosopher Xenophanes (570–480 BCE) who observed that people model their gods after themselves. He argued against the conception of deities as fundamentally anthropomorphic:

But if cattle and horses and lions had hands
or could paint with their hands and create works such as men do,
horses like horses and cattle like cattle
also would depict the gods' shapes and make their bodies
of such a sort as the form they themselves have.
...
Ethiopians say that their gods are snub–nosed [σιμούς] and black
Thracians that they are pale and red-haired. (Note: Many other translations of this passage have Xenophanes state that the Thracians were "blond".)

Xenophanes said that "the greatest god" resembles man "neither in form nor in mind".

Both Judaism and Islam reject an anthropomorphic deity, believing that God is beyond human comprehension. Judaism's rejection of an anthropomorphic deity began with the prophets, who explicitly rejected any likeness of God to humans. Their rejection grew further after the Islamic Golden Age in the tenth century, which Maimonides codified in the twelfth century, in his thirteen principles of Jewish faith. (Note: Moses Maimonides quoted Rabbi Abraham Ben David: "It is stated in the Torah and books of the prophets that God has no body, as stated 'Since G-d your God is the god (lit. gods) in the heavens above and in the earth below" and a body cannot be in both places. And it was said 'Since you have not seen any image' and it was said 'To who would you compare me, and I would be equal to them?' and if he was a body, he would be like the other bodies.")

In the Ismaili interpretation of Islam, assigning attributes to God as well as negating any attributes from God (via negativa) both qualify as anthropomorphism and are rejected, as God cannot be understood by either assigning attributes to Him or taking them away. The 10th-century Ismaili philosopher Abu Yaqub al-Sijistani suggested the method of double negation; for example: "God is not existent" followed by "God is not non-existent". This glorifies God from any understanding or human comprehension.

In secular thought, one of the most notable criticisms began in 1600 with Francis Bacon, who argued against Aristotle's teleology, which declared that everything behaves as it does in order to achieve some end, in order to fulfill itself. Bacon pointed out that achieving ends is a human activity and to attribute it to nature misconstrues it as humanlike. Modern criticisms followed Bacon's ideas such as critiques of Baruch Spinoza and David Hume. The latter, for instance, embedded his arguments in his wider criticism of human religions and specifically demonstrated in what he cited as their "inconsistence" where, on one hand, the Deity is painted in the most sublime colors but, on the other, is degraded to nearly human levels by giving him human infirmities, passions, and prejudices. In Faces in the Clouds, anthropologist Stewart Guthrie proposes that all religions are anthropomorphisms that originate in the brain's tendency to detect the presence or vestiges of other humans in natural phenomena.

Some scholars argue that anthropomorphism overestimates the similarity of humans and nonhumans and therefore could not yield accurate accounts.

== In literature ==
=== Religious texts ===
There are various examples of personification in both the Hebrew Bible and Christian New Testaments, as well as in the texts of some other religions.

=== Fables ===
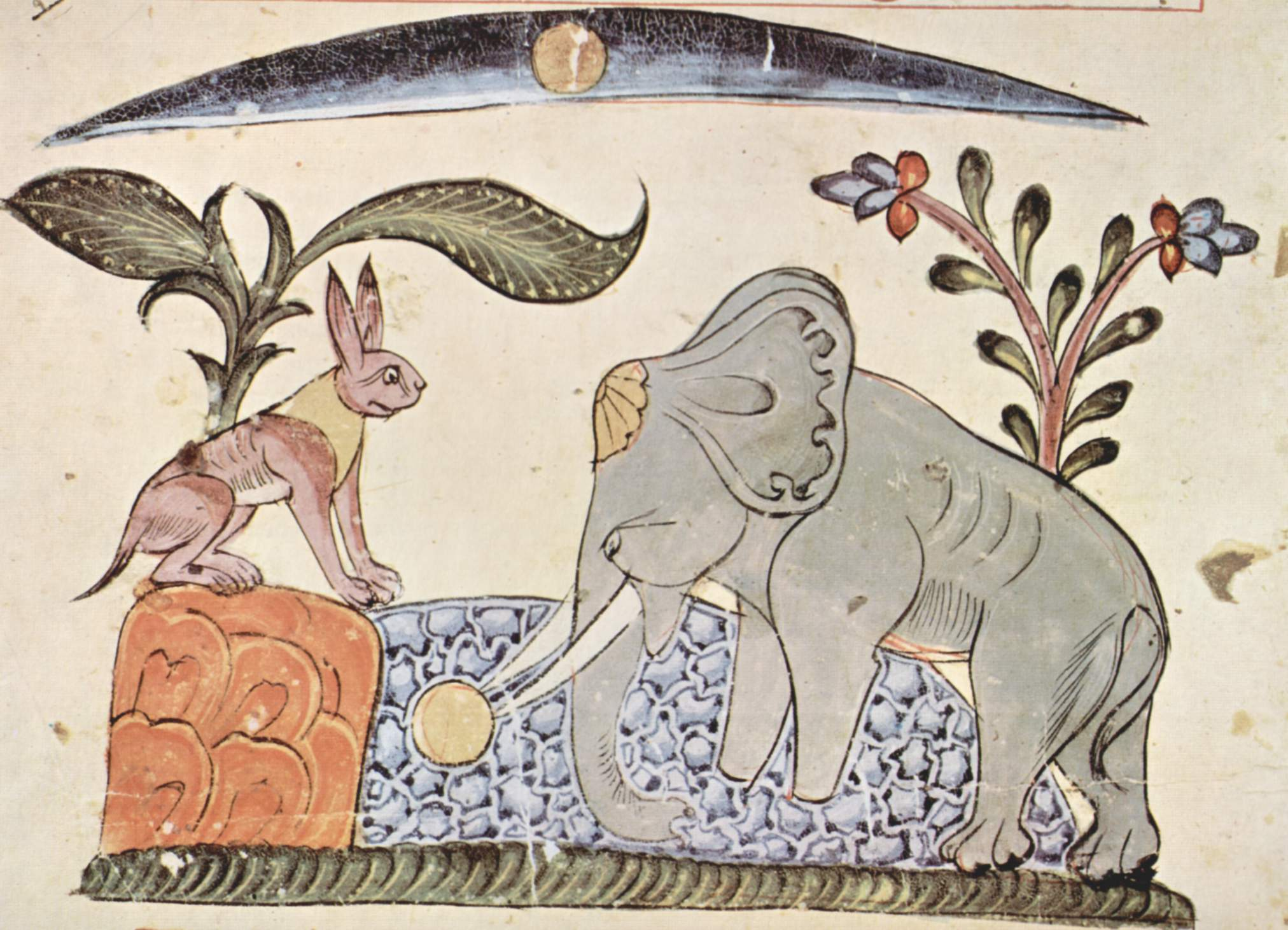
From the Panchatantra: Rabbit fools Elephant by showing the reflection of the moon.

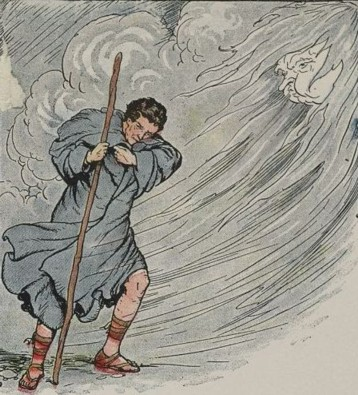
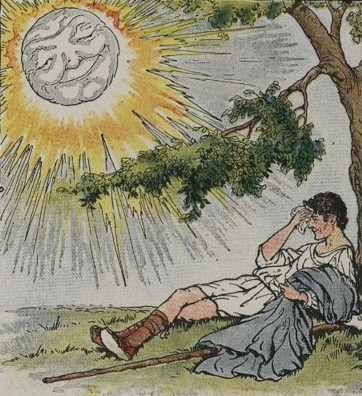
Illustration by Milo Winter of Aesop's fable, The North Wind and the Sun, a personified North Wind and the Sun with a traveler.

Anthropomorphism, also referred to as personification, is a well-established literary device from ancient times. The story of "The Hawk and the Nightingale" in Hesiod's Works and Days preceded Aesop's fables by centuries. Collections of linked fables from India, the Jataka Tales and Panchatantra, also employ anthropomorphized animals to illustrate principles of life. Many of the stereotypes of animals that are recognized today, such as the wily fox and the proud lion, can be found in these collections. Aesop's anthropomorphisms were so familiar by the first century CE that they colored the thinking of at least one philosopher:

And there is another charm about him, namely, that he puts animals in a pleasing light and makes them interesting to mankind. For after being brought up from childhood with these stories, and after being as it were nursed by them from babyhood, we acquire certain opinions of the several animals and think of some of them as royal animals, of others as silly, of others as witty, and others as innocent.

— Apollonius of Tyana

Apollonius noted that the fable was created to teach wisdom through fictions that are meant to be taken as fictions, contrasting them favorably with the poets' stories of the deities that are sometimes taken literally. Aesop, "by announcing a story which everyone knows not to be true, told the truth by the very fact that he did not claim to be relating real events". The same consciousness of the fable as fiction is to be found in other examples across the world, one example being a traditional Ashanti way of beginning tales of the anthropomorphic trickster-spider Anansi: "We do not really mean, we do not really mean that what we are about to say is true. A story, a story; let it come, let it go."

=== Fairy tales ===
Anthropomorphic motifs have been common in fairy tales from the earliest ancient examples set in a mythological context to the great collections of the Brothers Grimm and Perrault. The Tale of Two Brothers (Egypt, 13th century BCE) features several talking cows and in Cupid and Psyche (Rome, 2nd century CE) Zephyrus, the west wind, carries Psyche away. Later an ant feels sorry for her and helps her in her quest.

=== Modern literature ===
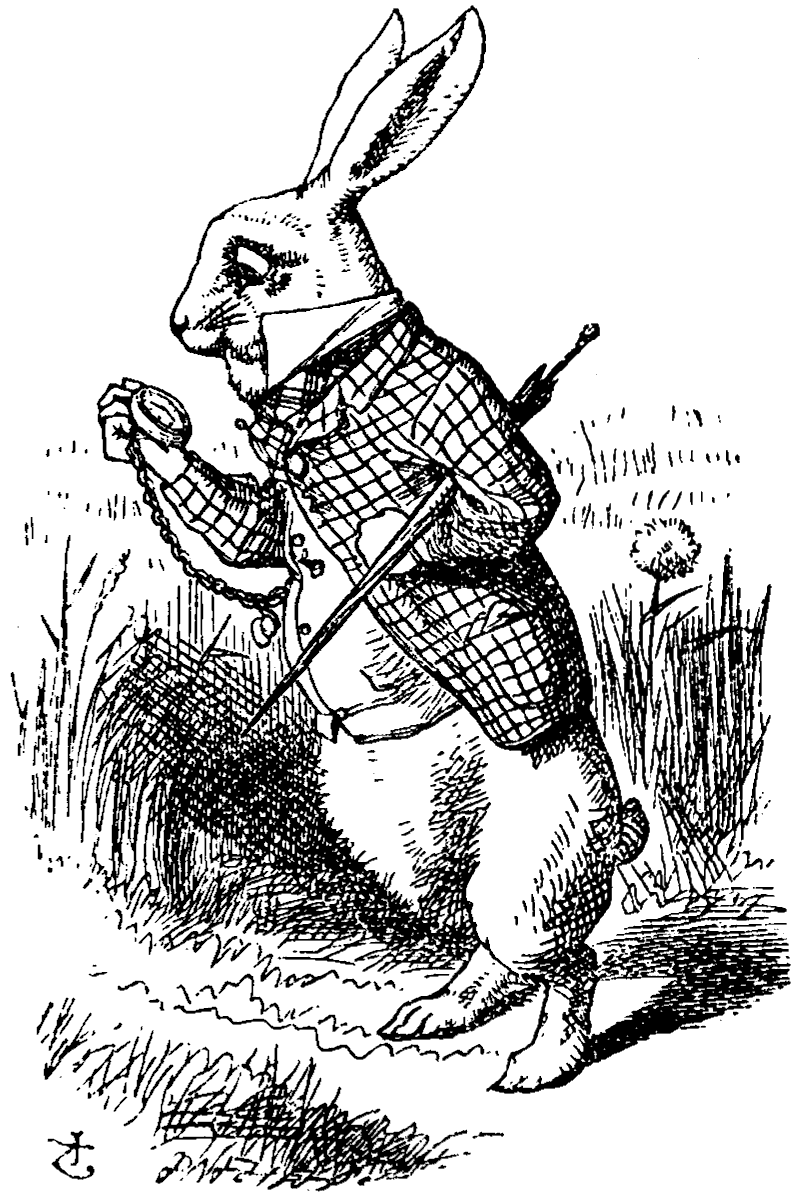
John Tenniel's depiction of this anthropomorphic rabbit was featured in the first chapter of Lewis Carroll's Alice's Adventures in Wonderland.

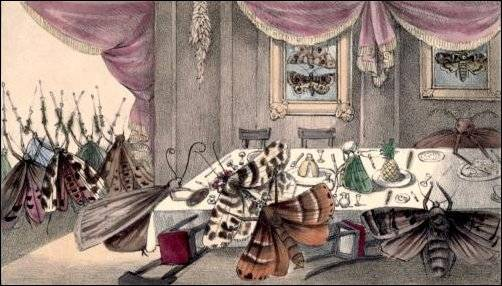
From The Emperor's Rout (1831)

Building on the popularity of fables and fairy tales, children's literature began to emerge in the nineteenth century with works such as Alice's Adventures in Wonderland (1865) by Lewis Carroll, The Adventures of Pinocchio (1883) by Carlo Collodi and The Jungle Book (1894) by Rudyard Kipling, all employing anthropomorphic elements. This continued in the twentieth century with many of the most popular titles having anthropomorphic characters, examples being The Tale of Peter Rabbit (1901) and later books by Beatrix Potter; (Note: The Victoria and Albert Museum wrote: "Beatrix Potter is still one of the world's best-selling and best-loved children's authors. Potter wrote and illustrated a total of 28 books, including the 23 Tales, the 'little books' that have been translated into more than 35 languages and sold over 100 million copies.") The Wind in the Willows by Kenneth Grahame (1908); Winnie-the-Pooh (1926) and The House at Pooh Corner (1928) by A. A. Milne; and The Lion, the Witch, and the Wardrobe (1950) and the subsequent books in The Chronicles of Narnia series by C. S. Lewis.

In many of these stories the animals can be seen as representing facets of human personality and character. As John Rowe Townsend remarks, discussing The Jungle Book in which the boy Mowgli must rely on his new friends the bear Baloo and the black panther Bagheera, "The world of the jungle is in fact both itself and our world as well". A notable work aimed at an adult audience is George Orwell's Animal Farm, in which all the main characters are anthropomorphic animals. Non-animal examples include Rev. W. Awdry's Railway Series stories featuring Thomas the Tank Engine and other anthropomorphic locomotives. Author Jilly Cooper has been criticised for over-use of the attribution in her novel Mount!

The fantasy genre developed from mythological, fairy tale, and Romance motifs sometimes have anthropomorphic animals as characters. The best-selling examples of the genre are The Hobbit (1937) and The Lord of the Rings (Note: 150 million sold, a 2007 estimate of copies of the full story sold, whether published as one volume, three, or some other configuration.) (1954–1955), both by J. R. R. Tolkien, books peopled with talking creatures such as ravens, spiders, and the dragon Smaug and a multitude of anthropomorphic goblins and elves. John D. Rateliff calls this the "Doctor Dolittle Theme" in his book The History of the Hobbit and Tolkien saw this anthropomorphism as closely linked to the emergence of human language and myth: "...The first men to talk of 'trees and stars' saw things very differently. To them, the world was alive with mythological beings... To them the whole of creation was 'myth-woven and elf-patterned'."

Richard Adams developed a distinctive take on anthropomorphic writing in the 1970s: his debut novel, Watership Down (1972), featured rabbits that could talk—with their own distinctive language (Lapine) and mythology—and included a police-state warren, Efrafa. Despite this, Adams attempted to ensure his characters' behavior mirrored that of wild rabbits, engaging in fighting, copulating and defecating, drawing on Ronald Lockley's study The Private Life of the Rabbit as research. Adams returned to anthropomorphic storytelling in his later novels The Plague Dogs (1977) and Traveller (1988).

By the 21st century, the children's picture book market had expanded massively. (Note: It is estimated that the UK market for children's books was worth £672m in 2004.) Perhaps a majority of picture books have some kind of anthropomorphism, with popular examples being The Very Hungry Caterpillar (1969) by Eric Carle and The Gruffalo (1999) by Julia Donaldson.

Anthropomorphism in literature and other media led to a sub-culture known as furry fandom, which promotes and creates stories and artwork involving anthropomorphic animals, and the examination and interpretation of humanity through anthropomorphism. This can often be shortened in searches as "anthro", used by some as an alternative term to "furry".

Anthropomorphic characters have also been a staple of the comic book genre. The most prominent one was Neil Gaiman's the Sandman which had a huge impact on how characters that are physical embodiments are written in the fantasy genre. Other examples also include the mature Hellblazer (personified political and moral ideas), Fables and its spin-off series Jack of Fables, which was unique for having anthropomorphic representation of literary techniques and genres. Various Japanese manga and anime have used anthropomorphism as the basis of their story. Examples include Squid Girl (anthropomorphized squid), Hetalia: Axis Powers (personified countries), Upotte!! (personified guns), Arpeggio of Blue Steel and Kancolle (personified ships).

== In media ==
=== In film ===
Big Buck Bunny is a free animated short featuring anthropomorphic characters.

Some of the most notable examples are the Walt Disney characters Mickey Mouse, Donald Duck, Goofy, and Oswald the Lucky Rabbit; the Looney Tunes characters Bugs Bunny, Daffy Duck, and Porky Pig; the Tom and Jerry characters Tom Cat and Jerry Mouse, Spike the Bulldog and Tyke the Bulldog; and an array of others from the 1920s to the present day.

In the Disney/Pixar franchises Cars and Planes, all the characters are anthropomorphic vehicles, while in Toy Story, they are anthropomorphic toys. Other Pixar franchises like Monsters, Inc features anthropomorphic monsters and Finding Nemo features anthropomorphic sea animals (like fish, sharks, and whales). Discussing anthropomorphic animals from DreamWorks franchise Madagascar, Timothy Laurie suggests that "social differences based on conflict and contradiction are naturalized and made less 'contestable' through the classificatory matrix of human and nonhuman relations". Other DreamWorks franchises like Shrek features fairy tale characters, and Blue Sky Studios of 20th Century Fox franchises like Ice Age features anthropomorphic extinct animals. Other characters in SpongeBob SquarePants features anthropomorphic sea animals as well (like sea sponges, starfish, octopus, crabs, whales, puffer fish, lobsters, and zooplankton).

All of the characters in Walt Disney Animation Studios' Zootopia (2016) and its sequel (2025) are anthropomorphic animals in entirely nonhuman civilization.

The five main characters in Dreamworks Animation's The Bad Guys, as well as the main villains in both of the films and supporting character Diane Foxington, are anthropomorphic animals living in a human society.

The live-action/animated franchise Alvin and the Chipmunks by 20th Century Fox centers around anthropomorphic talkative and singing chipmunks. The female singing chipmunks called The Chipettes are also centered in some of the franchise's films.

Despite not speaking, Gromit from the Aardman franchise Wallace & Gromit is an anthropomorphic dog.

Depsite not speaking, Snoopy from the Sony franchise Peanuts is anthropomorphic.

=== In television ===
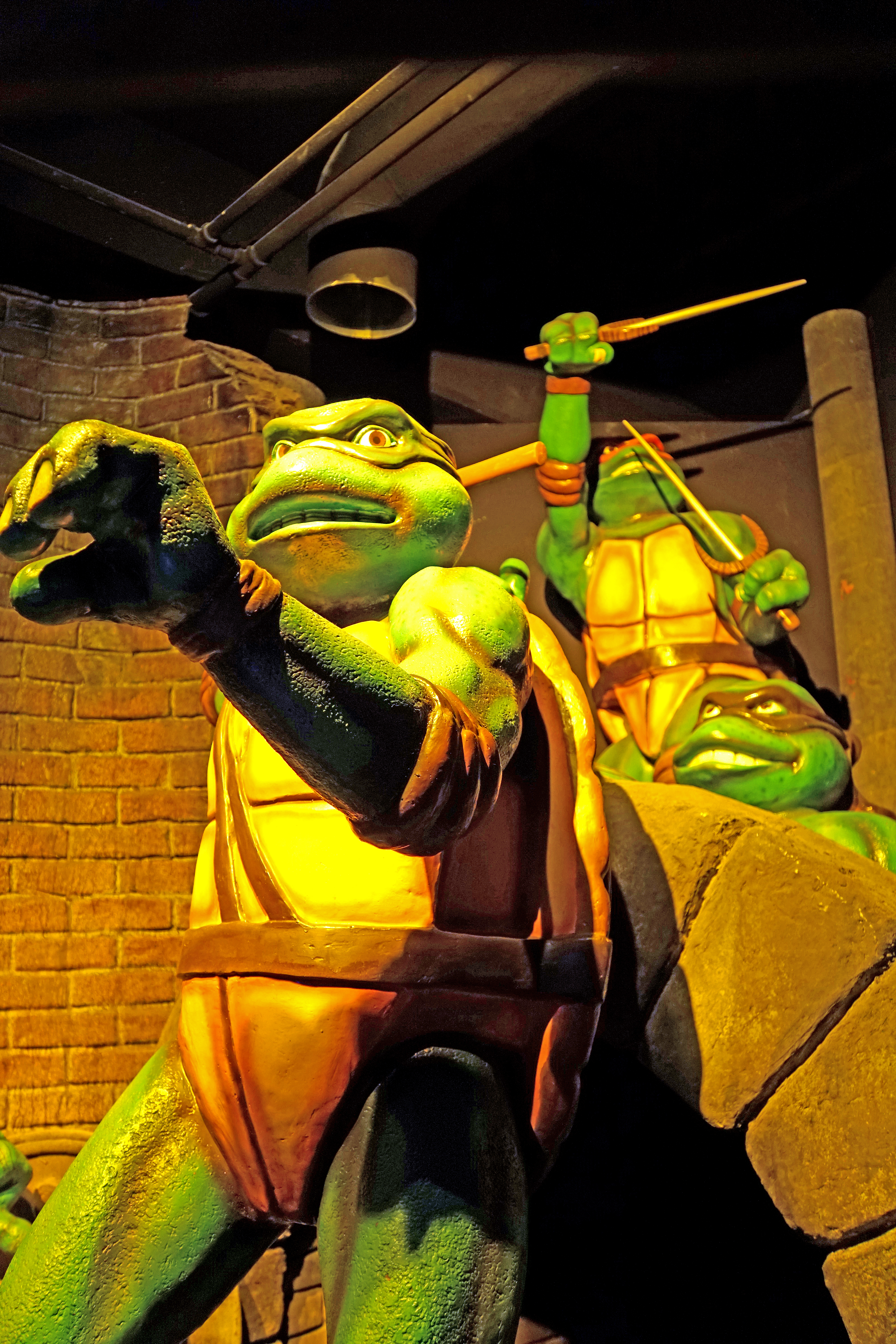
Statues of the anthropomorphic turtles of Teenage Mutant Ninja Turtles

Since the 1960s, anthropomorphism has also been represented in various animated television shows such as Biker Mice From Mars (1993–1996), SWAT Kats: The Radical Squadron (1993–1995) and Street Sharks (1995–1997). Teenage Mutant Ninja Turtles, first aired in 1987, features four pizza-loving anthropomorphic turtles with a great knowledge of ninjutsu, led by their anthropomorphic rat sensei, Master Splinter. Nickelodeon's longest running animated TV series SpongeBob SquarePants (1999–present), revolves around SpongeBob, a yellow sea sponge, living in the underwater town of Bikini Bottom with his anthropomorphic marine life friends. Cartoon Network's animated series The Amazing World of Gumball (2011–2019) are about anthropomorphic animals and inanimate objects. All of the characters in Hasbro Studios' TV series My Little Pony: Friendship Is Magic (2010–2019) are anthropomorphic fantasy creatures, with most of them being ponies living in the pony-inhabited land of Equestria. The Netflix original series Centaurworld focuses on a warhorse who gets transported to a Dr. Seuss-like world full of centaurs who possess the bottom half of any animal, as opposed to the traditional horse.

In the American animated TV series Family Guy, one of the show's main characters, Brian, is a dog. Brian shows many human characteristics – he walks upright, talks, smokes, and drinks Martinis – but also acts like a normal dog in other ways; for example, he cannot resist chasing a ball and barks at the mailman, believing him to be a threat. In a similar case, BoJack Horseman, an American Netflix adult animated black comedy series, takes place in an alternate world where humans and anthropomorphic animals live side by side, and centers around the life of BoJack Horseman; a humanoid horse who was a one hit wonder on a popular 1990s sitcom Horsin' Around, living off the show's residuals in present time. Multiple main characters of the series are other animals who possess human body form and other human-like traits and identity as well; Mr. Peanutbutter, a humanoid dog lives a mostly human life—he speaks American English, walks upright, owns a house, drives a car, is in a romantic relationship with a human woman (in this series, as animals and humans are seen as equal, relationships like this are not seen as bestiality but seen as regular human sexuality), Diane, and has a successful career in television—however also exhibits dog traits—he sleeps in a human-size dog bed, gets arrested for having a drag race with the mailman and is once forced to wear a dog cone after he gets stitches in his arm.

The PBS Kids animated series Let's Go Luna! centers on an anthropomorphic female Moon who speaks, sings, and dances. She comes down out of the sky to serve as a tutor of international culture to the three main characters: a boy frog and wombat and a girl butterfly, who are supposed to be preschool children traveling a world populated by anthropomorphic animals with a circus run by their parents.

The French-Belgian animated series Mush-Mush & the Mushables takes place in a world inhabited by Mushables, which are anthropomorphic fungi, along with other critters such as beetles, snails, and frogs.

=== In video games ===
In Armello, anthropomorphic animals battle for control of the animal kingdom.

Sonic the Hedgehog, a video game franchise debuting in 1991, features a speedy blue hedgehog as the main protagonist. This series' characters are almost all anthropomorphic animals such as foxes, cats, and other hedgehogs who are able to speak and walk on their hind legs like normal humans. As with most anthropomorphisms of animals, clothing is of little or no importance, where some characters may be fully clothed while some wear only shoes and gloves.

Another popular example in video games is the Super Mario series, debuting in 1985 with Super Mario Bros., of which main antagonist includes a fictional species of anthropomorphic turtle-like creatures known as Koopas. Other games in the series, as well as of other of its greater Mario franchise, spawned similar characters such as Yoshi, Donkey Kong and many others.

=== In marketing ===
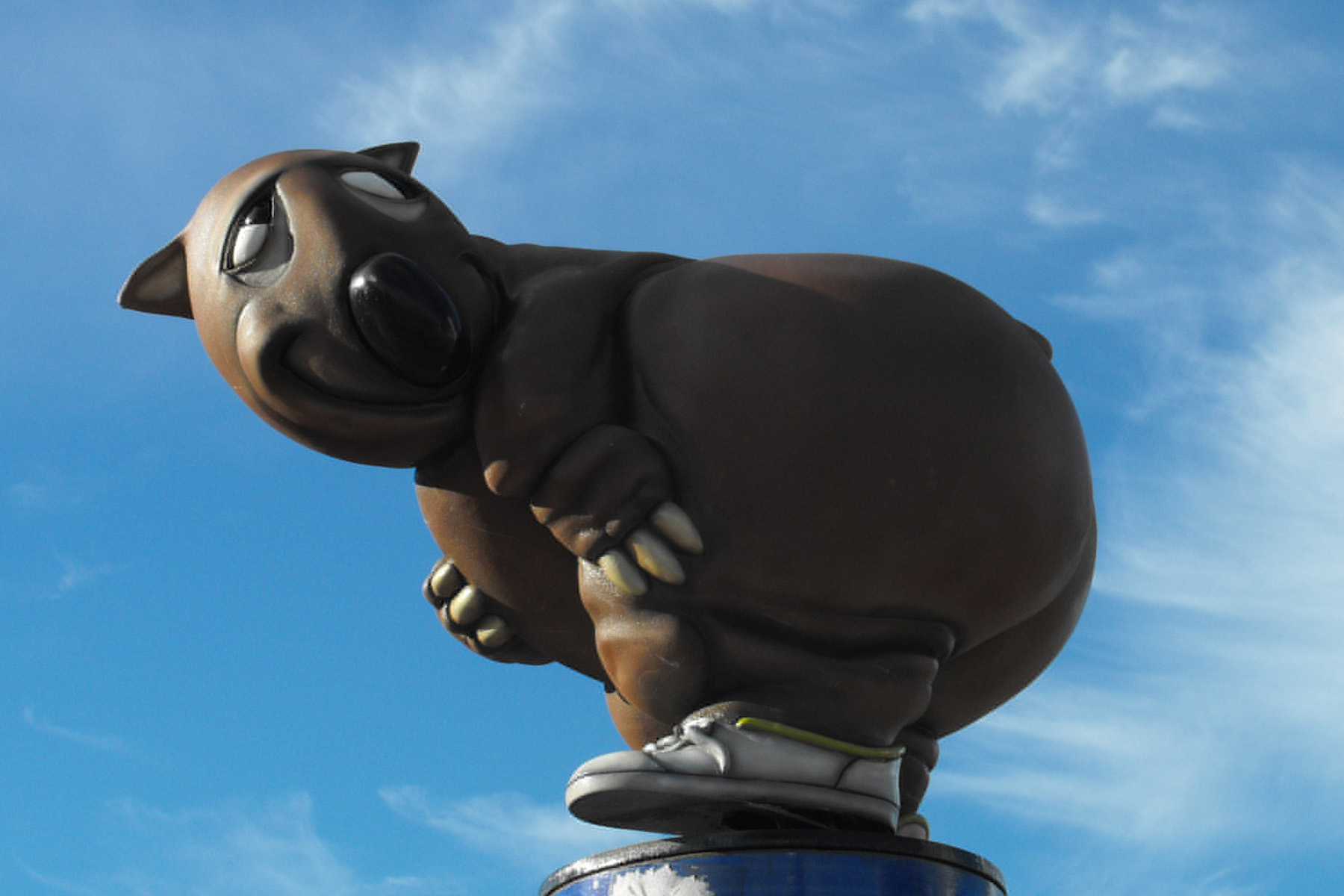
Fatso the Fat-Arsed Wombat, a popular symbol of the Sydney 2000 Summer Olympics created as a parody of the commercial official mascots

For branding, merchandising, and representation, figures known as mascots are now often employed to personify sports teams, corporations, and major events such as the World's Fair and the Olympics. These personifications may be simple human or animal figures, such as Ronald McDonald or the donkey that represents the United States's Democratic Party. Other times, they are anthropomorphic items, such as "Clippy" or the "Michelin Man". Most often, they are anthropomorphic animals such as the Energizer Bunny or the San Diego Chicken. The practice is particularly widespread in Japan, where cities, regions, and companies all have mascots, collectively known as yuru-chara. Two of the most popular are Kumamon (a bear who represents Kumamoto Prefecture) and Funassyi (a pear who represents Funabashi, a suburb of Tokyo).

Anthropomorphism of inanimate objects can affect product buying behavior. When products seem to resemble a human schema, such as the front of a car resembling a face, potential buyers evaluate that product more positively than if they do not anthropomorphize the object.

People also tend to trust robots to do more complex tasks such as driving a car or childcare if the robot resembles humans in ways such as having a face, voice, and name; mimicking human motions; expressing emotion; and displaying some variability in behavior.

== Art history ==
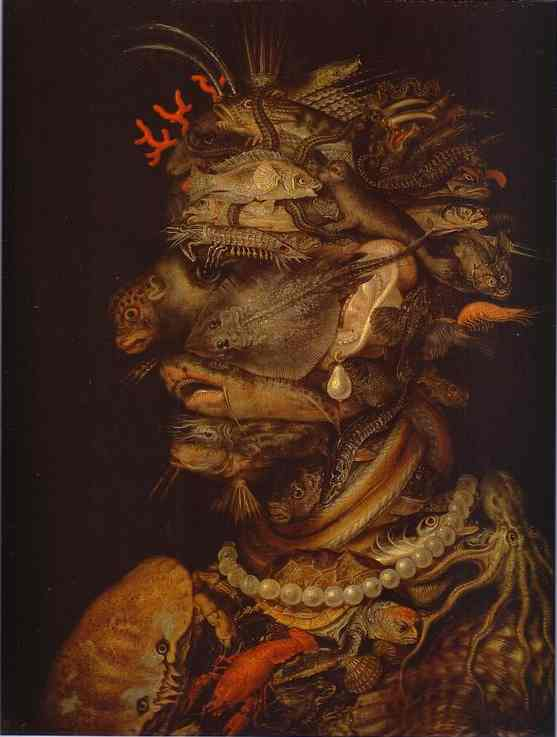
Anthropomorphic pareidolia by Giuseppe Arcimboldo

=== Claes Oldenburg ===
Claes Oldenburg's soft sculptures are commonly described as anthropomorphic. Depicting common household objects, Oldenburg's sculptures were considered Pop Art. Reproducing these objects, often at a greater size than the original, Oldenburg created his sculptures out of soft materials. The anthropomorphic qualities of the sculptures were mainly in their sagging and malleable exterior which mirrored the not-so-idealistic forms of the human body. In "Soft Light Switches" Oldenburg creates a household light switch out of vinyl. The two identical switches, in a dulled orange, insinuate nipples. The soft vinyl references the aging process as the sculpture wrinkles and sinks with time.

=== Minimalism ===
In the essay "Art and Objecthood", Michael Fried makes the case that "literalist art" (minimalism) becomes theatrical by means of anthropomorphism. The viewer engages the minimalist work, not as an autonomous art object, but as a theatrical interaction. Fried references a conversation in which Tony Smith answers questions about his six-foot cube, "Die".

Q: Why didn't you make it larger so that it would loom over the observer?

A: I was not making a monument.

Q: Then why didn't you make it smaller so that the observer could see over the top?

A: I was not making an object.

Fried implies an anthropomorphic connection by means of "a surrogate person – that is, a kind of statue."

The minimalist decision of "hollowness" in much of their work was also considered by Fried to be "blatantly anthropomorphic". This "hollowness" contributes to the idea of a separate inside; an idea mirrored in the human form. Fried considers the Literalist art's "hollowness" to be "biomorphic" as it references a living organism.

=== Post-minimalism ===
Curator Lucy Lippard's Eccentric Abstraction show, in 1966, sets up Briony Fer's writing of a post-minimalist anthropomorphism. Reacting to Fried's interpretation of minimalist art's "looming presence of objects which appear as actors might on a stage", Fer interprets the artists in Eccentric Abstraction to a new form of anthropomorphism. She puts forth the thoughts of Surrealist writer Roger Caillois, who speaks of the "spacial lure of the subject, the way in which the subject could inhabit their surroundings." Caillous uses the example of an insect who "through camouflage does so in order to become invisible... and loses its distinctness." For Fer, the anthropomorphic qualities of imitation found in the erotic, organic sculptures of artists Eva Hesse and Louise Bourgeois, are not necessarily for strictly "mimetic" purposes. Instead, like the insect, the work must come into being in the "scopic field... which we cannot view from outside."

== Animals ==
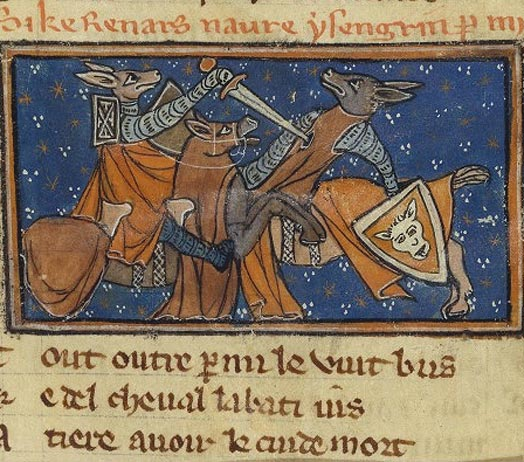
An illumination from a late 13th century manuscript of the Roman de Renart

Other examples of anthropomorphism include the attribution of human traits to animals, especially domesticated pets such as dogs and cats. Examples of this include thinking a dog is smiling simply because it is showing his teeth, or a cat mourns for a dead owner. Anthropomorphism may be beneficial to the welfare of animals. A 2012 study by Butterfield et al. found that utilizing anthropomorphic language when describing dogs created a greater willingness to help them in situations of distress. Previous studies have shown that individuals who attribute human characteristics to animals are less willing to eat them, and that the degree to which individuals perceive minds in other animals predicts the moral concern afforded to them. It is possible that anthropomorphism leads humans to like non-humans more when they have apparent human qualities, since perceived similarity has been shown to increase prosocial behavior toward other humans. A study of how animal behaviors were discussed on the television series Life found that the script very often used anthropomorphisms.

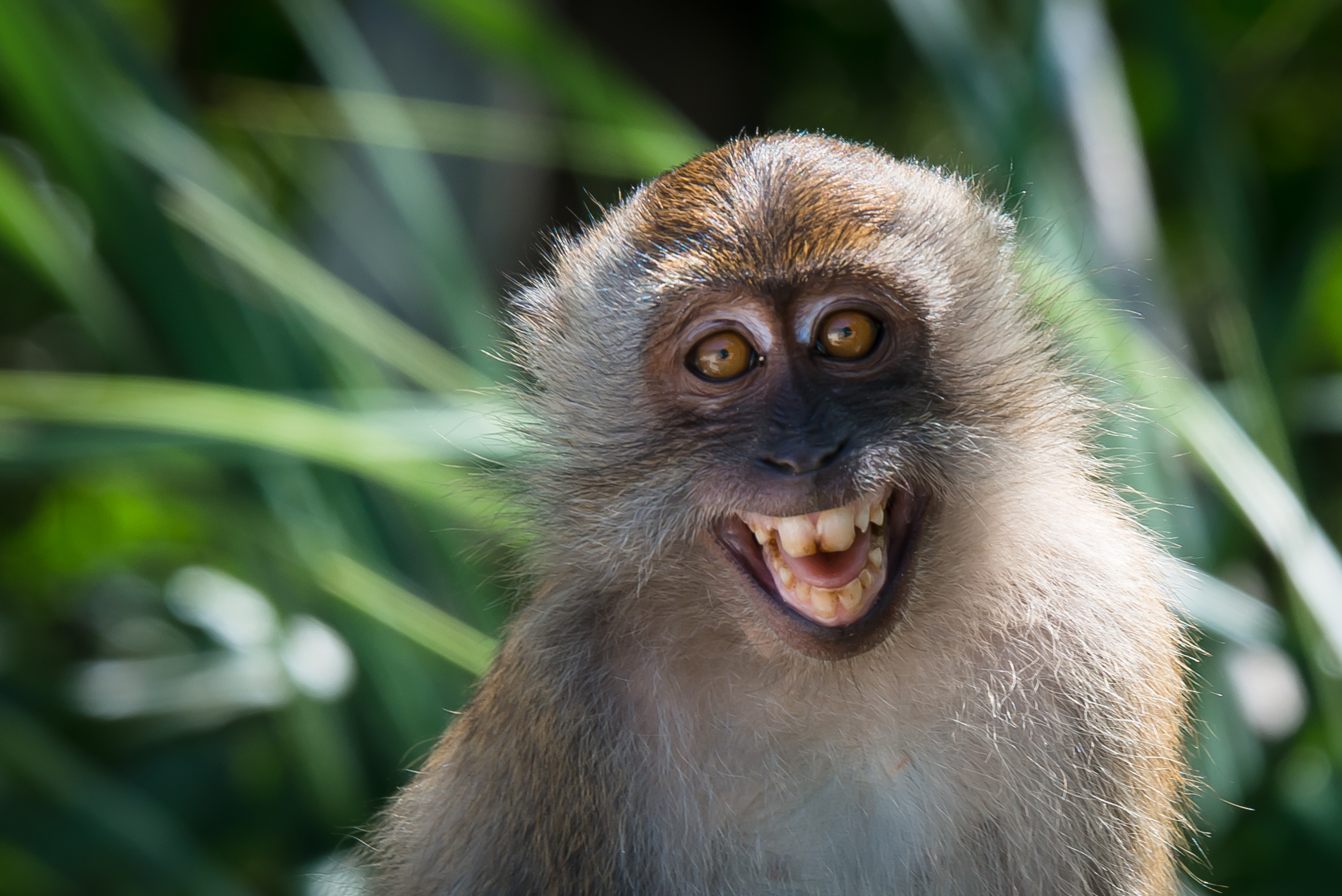
Frequently anthropomorphized by the public, while it resembles a human smile, it typically indicates stress or submission

However, despite these potential benefits for empathy and prosocial behavior, research indicates that anthropomorphism can also have negative consequences for animal welfare and species conservation. Treating wild animals as humans, such as dressing them in clothes, feeding them human diets, or keeping them in strict domestic settings, suppresses their natural biological needs and can mask clear signs of suffering. Furthermore, species-specific behaviors are often misinterpreted by the general public; for instance, facial expressions indicating fear, stress, or submission in primates are frequently misinterpreted as "smiles" of happiness. On a broader scale, this distorted and romanticized representation of wild animals, particularly on social media, normalizes keeping exotic animals as pets. This directly increases illegal wildlife trafficking networks and weakens global conservation efforts by creating the false illusion that endangered species live happily outside their natural habitats.

== In science ==
In science, the use of anthropomorphic language that suggests animals have intentions and emotions has traditionally been deprecated as indicating a lack of objectivity. Biologists have been warned to avoid assumptions that animals share any of the same mental, social, and emotional capacities of humans, and to rely instead on strictly observable evidence. In 1927 Ivan Pavlov wrote that animals should be considered "without any need to resort to fantastic speculations as to the existence of any possible subjective states". More recently, The Oxford companion to animal behaviour (1987) advised that "one is well advised to study the behaviour rather than attempting to get at any underlying emotion". Some scientists have used anthropomorphic language (apologetically) in metaphor to make subjects more humanly comprehensible or memorable. For example, in 1911, Wheeler wrote: "The larval insect is, if I may be permitted to lapse for a moment into anthropomorphism, a sluggish, greedy, self-centred creature, while the adult is industrious, abstemious and highly altruistic..."

Despite the impact of Charles Darwin's ideas in The Expression of the Emotions in Man and Animals (Konrad Lorenz in 1965 called him a "patron saint" of ethology) ethology has generally focused on behavior, not on emotion in animals.

Even insects play together, as has been described by that excellent observer, P. Huber, who saw ants chasing and pretending to bite each other, like so many puppies.

— Charles Darwin, The Descent of Man

The study of great apes in their own environment and in captivity (Note: In 1946, Hebb wrote: "A thoroughgoing attempt to avoid anthropomorphic description in the study of temperament was made over a two-year period at the Yerkes laboratories. All that resulted was an almost endless series of specific acts in which no order or meaning could be found. On the other hand, by the use of frankly anthropomorphic concepts of emotion and attitude one could quickly and easily describe the peculiarities of individual animals... Whatever the anthropomorphic terminology may seem to imply about conscious states in chimpanzee, it provides an intelligible and practical guide to behavior.") has changed attitudes to anthropomorphism. In the 1960s the three so-called "Leakey's Angels", Jane Goodall studying chimpanzees, Dian Fossey studying gorillas and Biruté Galdikas studying orangutans, were all accused of "that worst of ethological sins – anthropomorphism". The charge was brought about by their descriptions of the great apes in the field; it is now more widely accepted that empathy has an important part to play in research.

De Waal has written: "To endow animals with human emotions has long been a scientific taboo. But if we do not, we risk missing something fundamental, about both animals and us." Alongside this has come increasing awareness of the linguistic abilities of the great apes and the recognition that they are tool-makers and have individuality and culture.

Writing of cats in 1992, veterinarian Bruce Fogle points to the fact that "both humans and cats have identical neurochemicals and regions in the brain responsible for emotion" as evidence that "it is not anthropomorphic to credit cats with emotions such as jealousy".

Philosopher Lewis White Beck discerns an anthropomorphic mindset in the search for extraterrestrial intelligence, noting: "To believe that there are societies elsewhere bent upon and capable of communicating with us is not only to be anthropomorphic; even worse, it is to believe that civilizations elsewhere are like one civilization that has existed on only a small portion of this earth for only a few hundred years." In Beck's view, such anthropomorphism evolved because modern scientists, "have invariably assigned favorable probabilities to unknown but limiting conditions. Though they have insistently warned against the dangers of anthropomorphism, their models have been inescapably anthropomorphic."

=== In computing ===
In science fiction, an artificially intelligent computer or robot, even though it has not been programmed with human emotions, often spontaneously experiences those emotions anyway: for example, Agent Smith in The Matrix was influenced by a "disgust" toward humanity. This is an example of anthropomorphism: in reality, while an artificial intelligence could perhaps be deliberately programmed with human emotions or could develop something similar to an emotion as a means to an ultimate goal if it is useful to do so, it would not spontaneously develop human emotions for no purpose whatsoever, as portrayed in fiction.

One example of anthropomorphism would be to believe that one's computer is angry at them because they insulted it; another would be to believe that an intelligent robot would naturally find a woman attractive and be driven to mate with her. Scholars sometimes disagree with each other about whether a particular prediction about an artificial intelligence's behavior is logical, or whether the prediction constitutes illogical anthropomorphism. An example that might initially be considered anthropomorphism, but is in fact a logical statement about an artificial intelligence's behavior, would be the Dario Floreano experiments where certain robots spontaneously evolved a crude capacity for "deception", and tricked other robots into eating "poison" and dying: here, a trait, "deception", ordinarily associated with people rather than with machines, spontaneously evolves in a type of convergent evolution.

The conscious use of anthropomorphic metaphor is not intrinsically unwise; ascribing mental processes to the computer, under the proper circumstances, may serve the same purpose as it does when humans do it to other people: it may help persons to understand what the computer will do, how their actions will affect the computer, how to compare computers with humans, and conceivably how to design computer programs. However, inappropriate use of anthropomorphic metaphors can result in false beliefs about the behavior of computers, for example by causing people to overestimate how "flexible" computers are. According to Paul R. Cohen and Edward Feigenbaum, in order to differentiate between anthropomorphization and logical prediction of AI behavior, "the trick is to know enough about how humans and computers think to say exactly what they have in common, and, when we lack this knowledge, to use the comparison to suggest theories of human thinking or computer thinking."

Computers overturn the childhood hierarchical taxonomy of "stones (non-living) → plants (living) → animals (conscious) → humans (rational)", by introducing a non-human "actor" that appears to regularly behave rationally. Much of computing terminology derives from anthropomorphic metaphors: computers can "read", "write", or "catch a virus". Information technology presents no clear correspondence with any other entities in the world besides humans; the options are either to leverage an emotional, imprecise human metaphor, or to reject imprecise metaphor and make use of more precise, domain-specific technical terms. People often grant an unnecessary social role to computers during interactions. The underlying causes are debated; Youngme Moon and Clifford Nass propose that humans are emotionally, intellectually and physiologically biased toward social activity, and so when presented with even tiny social cues, deeply infused social responses are triggered automatically. This may allow incorporation of anthropomorphic features into computers/robots to enable more familiar "social" interactions, making them easier to use.

Alleged examples of anthropomorphism from and toward AI have included: Google engineer Blake Lemoine's widely derided 2022 claim that the Google LaMDA chatbot was sentient; the 2017 granting of honorary Saudi Arabian citizenship to the robot Sophia; and the reactions to the chatbot ELIZA in the 1960s, which became known as the ELIZA effect.

== Psychology ==
=== Foundational research ===
In psychology, the first empirical study of anthropomorphism was conducted in 1944 by Fritz Heider and Marianne Simmel. In the first part of this experiment, the researchers showed a 2-and-a-half-minute long animation of several shapes moving around on the screen in varying directions at various speeds. When subjects were asked to describe what they saw, they gave detailed accounts of the intentions and personalities of the shapes. For instance, the large triangle was characterized as a bully, chasing the other two shapes until they could trick the large triangle and escape. The researchers concluded that when people see objects making motions for which there is no obvious cause, they view these objects as intentional agents (individuals that deliberately make choices to achieve goals).

Modern psychologists generally characterize anthropomorphism as a cognitive bias. That is, anthropomorphism is a cognitive process by which people use their schemas about other humans as a basis for inferring the properties of non-human entities in order to make efficient judgements about the environment, even if those inferences are not always accurate. Schemas about humans are used as the basis because this knowledge is acquired early in life, is more detailed than knowledge about non-human entities, and is more readily accessible in memory. Anthropomorphism can also function as a strategy to cope with loneliness when other human connections are not available.

=== Three-factor theory ===
Since making inferences requires cognitive effort, anthropomorphism is likely to be triggered only when certain aspects about a person and their environment are true. Psychologist Adam Waytz and his colleagues created a three-factor theory of anthropomorphism to describe these aspects and predict when people are most likely to anthropomorphize. The three factors are:

- Elicited agent knowledge, or the amount of prior knowledge held about an object and the extent to which that knowledge is called to mind.
- Effectance, or the drive to interact with and understand one's environment.
- Sociality, the need to establish social connections.

When elicited agent knowledge is low and effectance and sociality are high, people are more likely to anthropomorphize. Various dispositional, situational, developmental, and cultural variables can affect these three factors, such as need for cognition, social disconnection, cultural ideologies, uncertainty avoidance, etc.

=== Developmental perspective ===
Children appear to anthropomorphize and use egocentric reasoning from an early age and use it more frequently than adults. Examples of this are describing a storm cloud as "angry" or drawing flowers with faces. This penchant for anthropomorphism is likely because children have acquired vast amounts of socialization, but not as much experience with specific non-human entities, so thus they have less developed alternative schemas for their environment. In contrast, autistic children may tend to describe anthropomorphized objects in purely mechanical terms (that is, in terms of what they do) because they have difficulties with theory of mind (ToM) according to past research. A 2018 study has shown that autistic people are more prone to object personification, suggesting that autistic empathy and ToM may be not only more complex but also more all-encompassing. The double empathy problem challenges the notion that autistic people have difficulties with ToM.

=== Effect on learning ===
Anthropomorphism can be used to assist learning. Specifically, anthropomorphized words and describing scientific concepts with intentionality can improve later recall of these concepts.

=== In mental health ===
In people with depression, social anxiety, or other mental illnesses, emotional support animals are a useful component of treatment partially because anthropomorphism of these animals can satisfy the patients' need for social connection.

== See also ==
- Aniconism – Antithetic concept
- Animism – Class of religious beliefs
- Anthropic principle – Hypothesis about sapient life and the universe
- Anthropocentrism – Worldview that humans are the most important beings
- Anthropology – Scientific study of humans, human behavior, and societies
- Anthropomorphic maps
- Anthropopathism – Attribution of human emotions to a deity
- Battle for Dream Island — Online phenomenon based on anthropomorphic objects
- Cynocephaly – Mythical creature
- Furry fandom – Subculture interested in anthropomorphic animals
- Great Chain of Being – Medieval Christian hierarchy of living beings
- Human-animal hybrid – Hypothetical organism
- Humanoid – Entity with human form or characteristics
- Moe anthropomorphism – Form of anthropomorphism in anime and manga
- National personification – Fictional character representing a country
- Nature fakers controversy – Academic debate
- Pareidolia – Seeing faces in everyday objects
- Pathetic fallacy – Attribution of human emotion and conduct to non-human things
- Prosopopoeia – Rhetorical device
- Speciesism – Philosophical term on species treatment
- Talking animals in fiction – Theme in mythology and folk tales
- Tashbih
- Zoomorphism – Type of art

== Sources ==
- Masson, Jeffrey Moussaieff; McCarthy, Susan (1996). When Elephants Weep: Emotional Lives of Animals. Vintage. p. 272. ISBN 978-0-09-947891-1.
