= Parrot tent =

Birdcage furniture

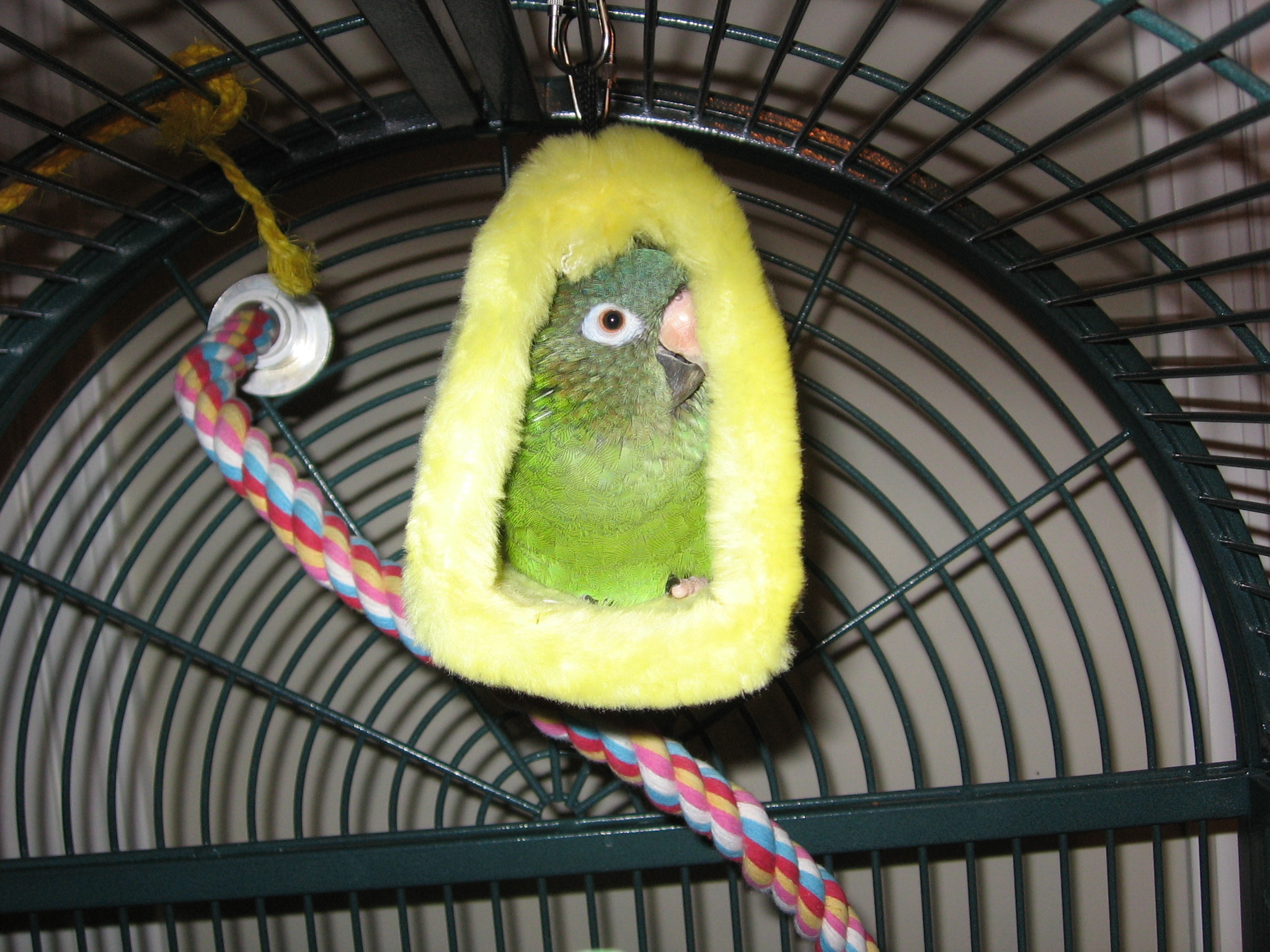
A blue-crowned parakeet sitting inside her parrot tent

A parrot tent is an item of birdcage furniture, usually made from fleece, synthetic fur or quilted fabric which when placed in the cage of a companion parrot, provides the bird a comfortable, soft-textured private space in which it may climb inside to play, warm itself, rest or sleep.

Often referred to by using popular brand names, such as the 'Happy Hut' or the 'Snuggle Sack', a parrot tent is typically hung from the roof of the parrot's cage using two or more clips. Several designs of tent are commercially available, for example soft canopies that sit over an existing perch, open-ended tubes and prisms, or fully enclosed teepee or dome-shaped bags with a single opening.

Care must be taken to ensure that the parrot does not consume pieces of the tent or accidentally become entangled and trapped in frayed threads, both of which may occur if the bird's natural chewing instincts compel it to gnaw upon the fabric and natural wood is not provided. The parrot may also come to view the tent as a potential nesting site, which may trigger unwanted behaviours in a pet bird, such as egg-laying and aggression in defence of the tent, although this varies from individual to individual. For these reasons, some avian experts advise entirely against the use of parrot tents.
