= Animal furniture =

Animal furniture may refer to:

- Pet furniture
- Furniture made out of animals
