= Birdcage =

Cage designed to house birds as pets

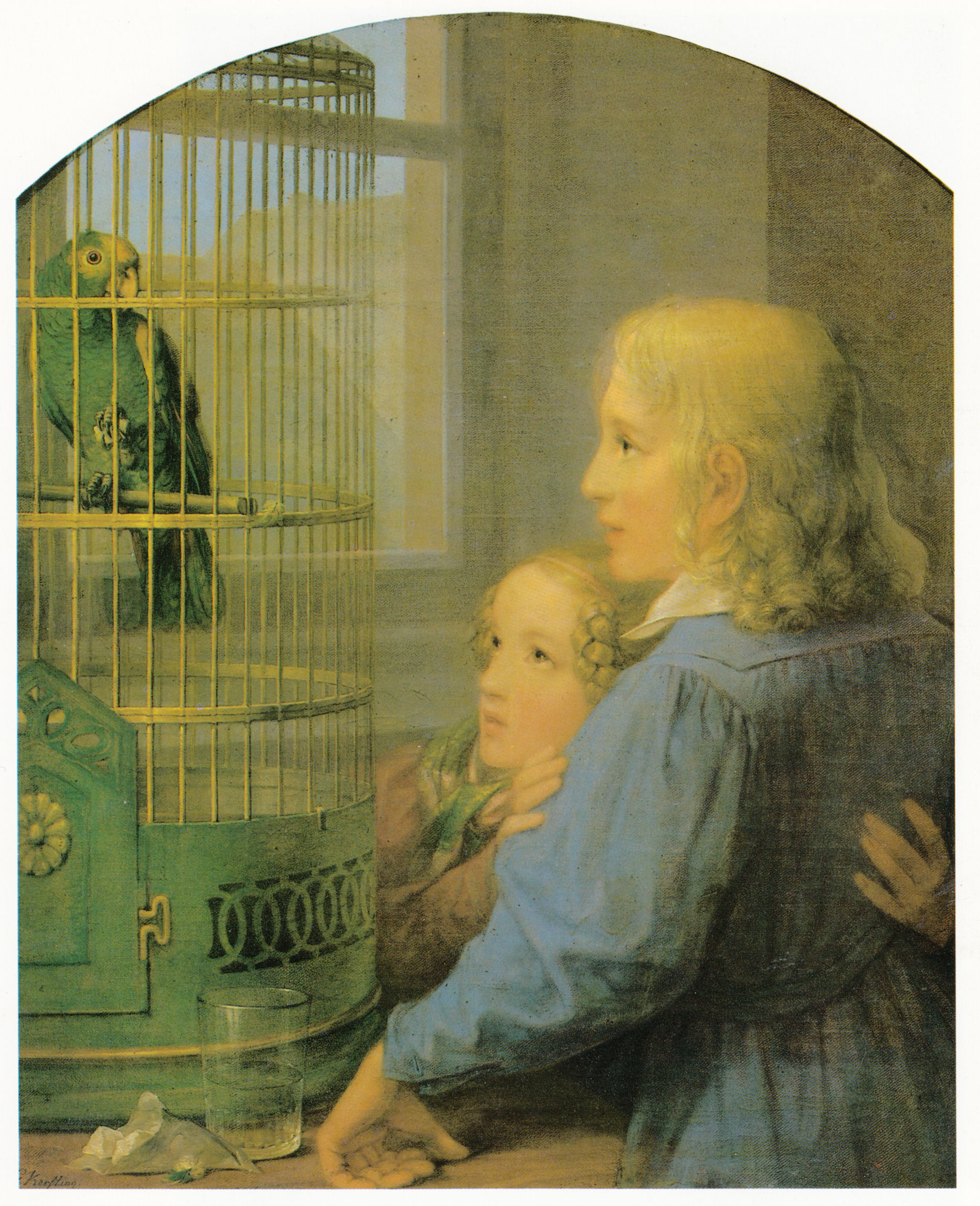
Two children with parrot cage (painting by Georg Friedrich Kersting, c. 1835)

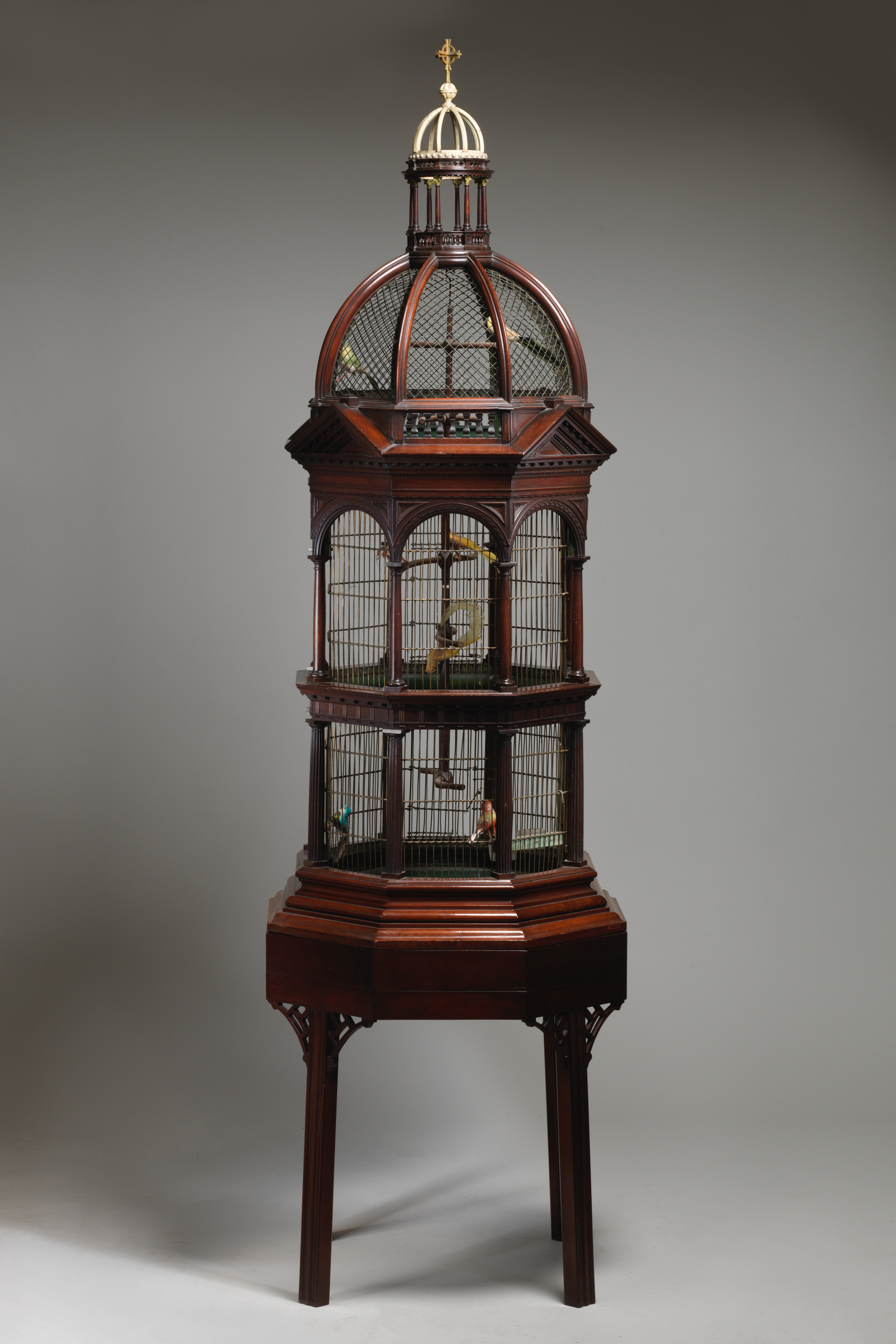
British birdcage, c. 1750, mahogany and brass, overall: 217.8 cm × 62.9 cm × 62.9 cm (85.7 in × 24.8 in × 24.8 in) Metropolitan Museum of Art (New York City)

A birdcage (or bird cage) is a cage designed to house birds as pets.

Antique (or antique-style) birdcages are often popular as collector's items or as household decor but most are not suitable for housing live birds, being too small, improper shape, using unsafe materials or construction. Longer, good quality cages designed for pet birds are more suitable.

== Design and size ==
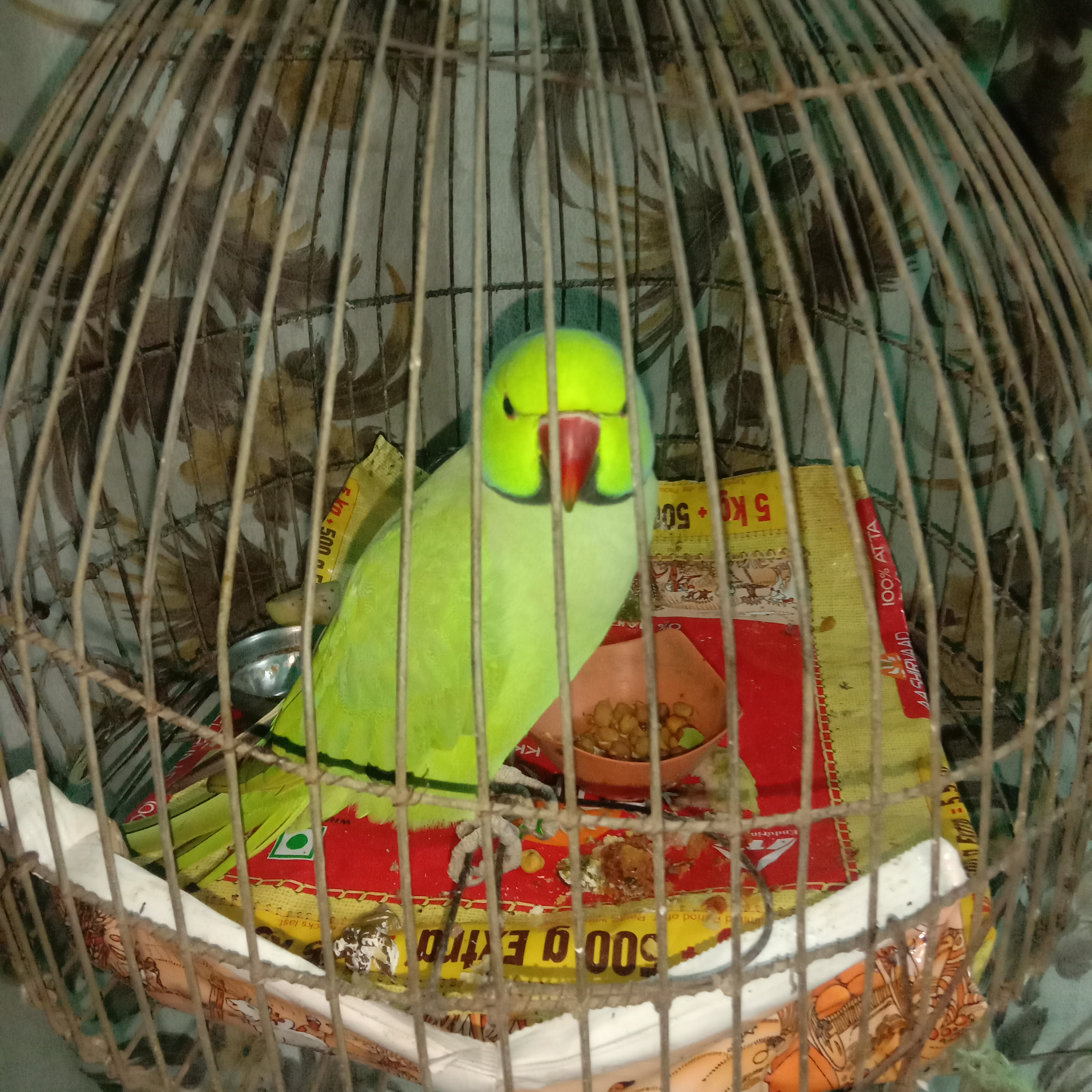
A caged Rose-ringed parakeet at a household in West Bengal, India.

In general, the larger and the more active the bird, the larger the cage one should use. The amount of time the bird will spend in the cage each day is also a factor. A bird that is caged most of the time requires far more space than a bird caged only at night.

Some birds have special requirements. Amazons and cockatiels prefer horizontal bars, as they like to climb. Messy eaters should have a seed skirt to catch food. Breeding birds may require a nest or breeding box and a larger size cage. Smart birds, like parrots and crows, need secure latching mechanisms to prevent them from figuring them out, and often require toys and/or play-stands to keep them entertained. Parrots in general tend to gnaw on cages, with larger macaws known to tear bars from flimsy cages. Zinc coated cages or chicken wire could cause toxicity to parrots over a number of years.

Most parrot cages are made of wrought iron and painted with a non-toxic paint referred to as powder-coating. A newer trend is cages made of solid stainless steel. Large parrot cages made of stainless steel are costly but will outlast a powder-coated cage by 5 to 6 times. The materials used to build the cages greatly affect the price. While small cages are relatively cheap, large parrot-sized cages can be more expensive than an aviary.

== History ==
Bird cages saw their earliest use in ancient Mesopotamia, Egypt, Persia, Greece, Rome, China, India, Babylon, among many others. During this time birds were kept often for religious or symbolic reasons, but were also a sign of wealth and aristocracy, such as the African birds imported to Roman courts. This trend continued in Europe as Portugal brought back Canaries in the 16th century. The Harz Mountain area in Germany became known for its unique style of birdcage, carving elaborate wooden cages resembling cuckoo clocks. The exotic bird trade became quite lucrative, some birds selling for their weight in gold. Captive birds were very much a status symbol, and were kept in wealthy households and courts throughout Western Europe, with especial patronage from monarchy. The 18th and 19th centuries were a remarkable period of creativity regarding birdcages. Influences ranged from China to gothic Europe. Perhaps the peak of bird keeping came during the Victorian age. New innovations in design and unique materials fed the craze for bird keeping. Even in colonial America, settlers kept birds in wooden or bamboo cages. In 1874, the Andrew B. Hendryx company (then called Hendryx & Bartholomew) was founded in America and joined Hartz Mountain as one of the lead manufacturer of fashionable birdcages. As the Art Deco and Arts and Crafts movement arose in the early 1900s, bird cage design reflected the trend, usually with oriental-style hanging cages. The next large shift in style was during the Atomic Age, when plastic became the predominant material in mass-produces cages. Slowly, iron and plastic cages gave way to the large, sleek, steel cages found in pet stores today.

== Safety ==
A cage for a tame pet bird which is allowed out daily should be large enough to allow it to easily extend its wings fully without hitting cage sides or toys or objects within the cage. In some countries, it is illegal to house a pet bird in a cage that does not permit it to spread its wings. Wingspans of common pet birds range from approximately 30 cm (12 in) for a budgie and 41 cm (16 in) for a cockatiel up to as much as 91–122 cm (36–48 in) for the larger macaws. Rectangular cages have replaced rounded cages due to the damaged wings caused by non-bird-friendly round cages.

Finches and canaries require larger cages that are long enough to permit flight. The bars should be spaced so that curious birds cannot stick their heads out of the cage and become stuck. The cage should also have non-toxic paint, because birds tend to gnaw at the cage, and if the paint is consumed, they can die from poisoning.

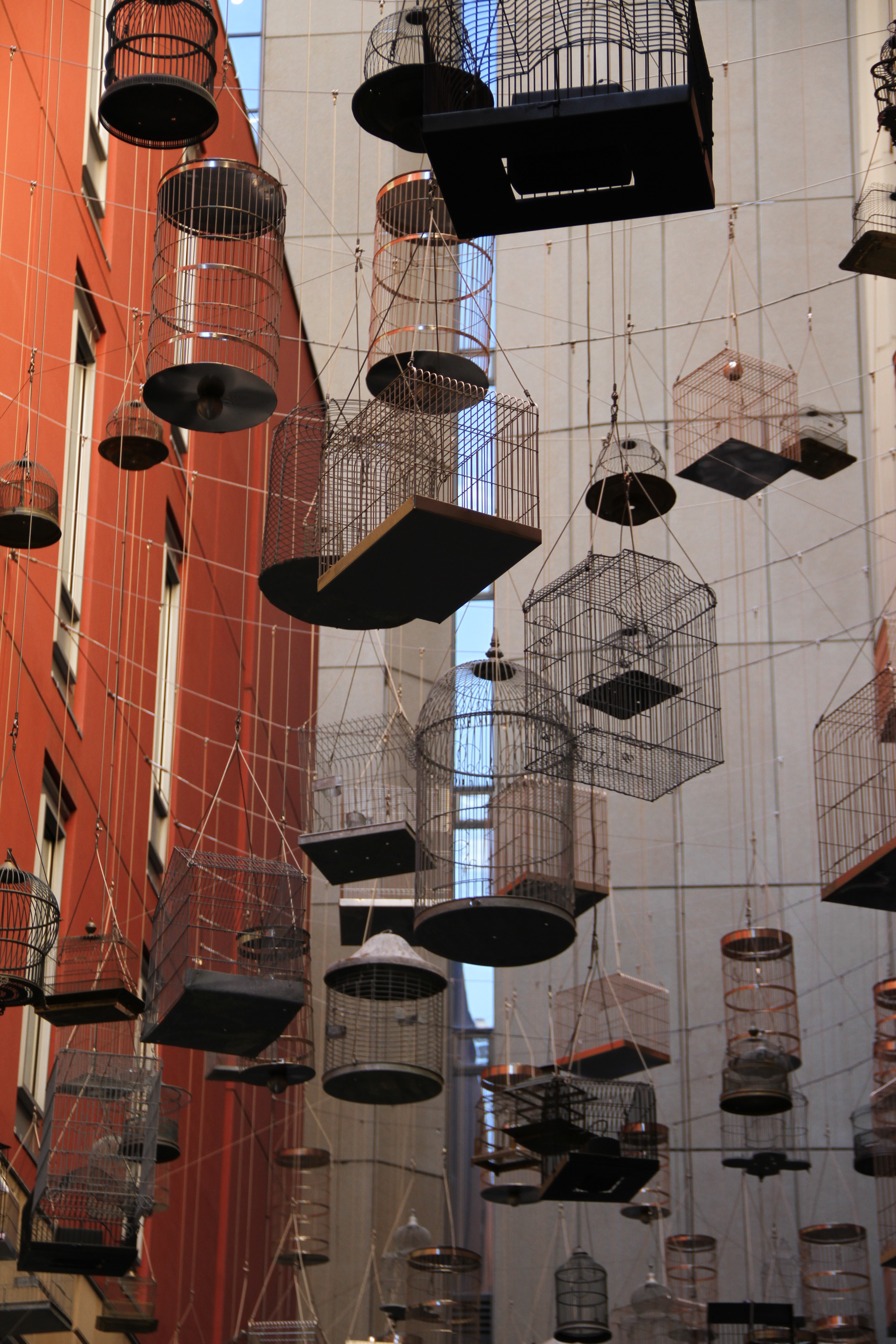
Birdcages used in the public artwork Forgotten Songs, Sydney.

Cages should also be equipped with appropriate perches. There should be several diameters of perches available, but the diameter should be large enough so that the bird's toes are unable to overlap or completely wrap around the perch. Flight cages and aviaries should be equipped with perches at each end with open space in the middle for flight.

== See also ==
- Aviary
- Aviculture
- Companion parrot
- Forgotten Songs (artwork)
- Parrot tent
