= Pet furniture =

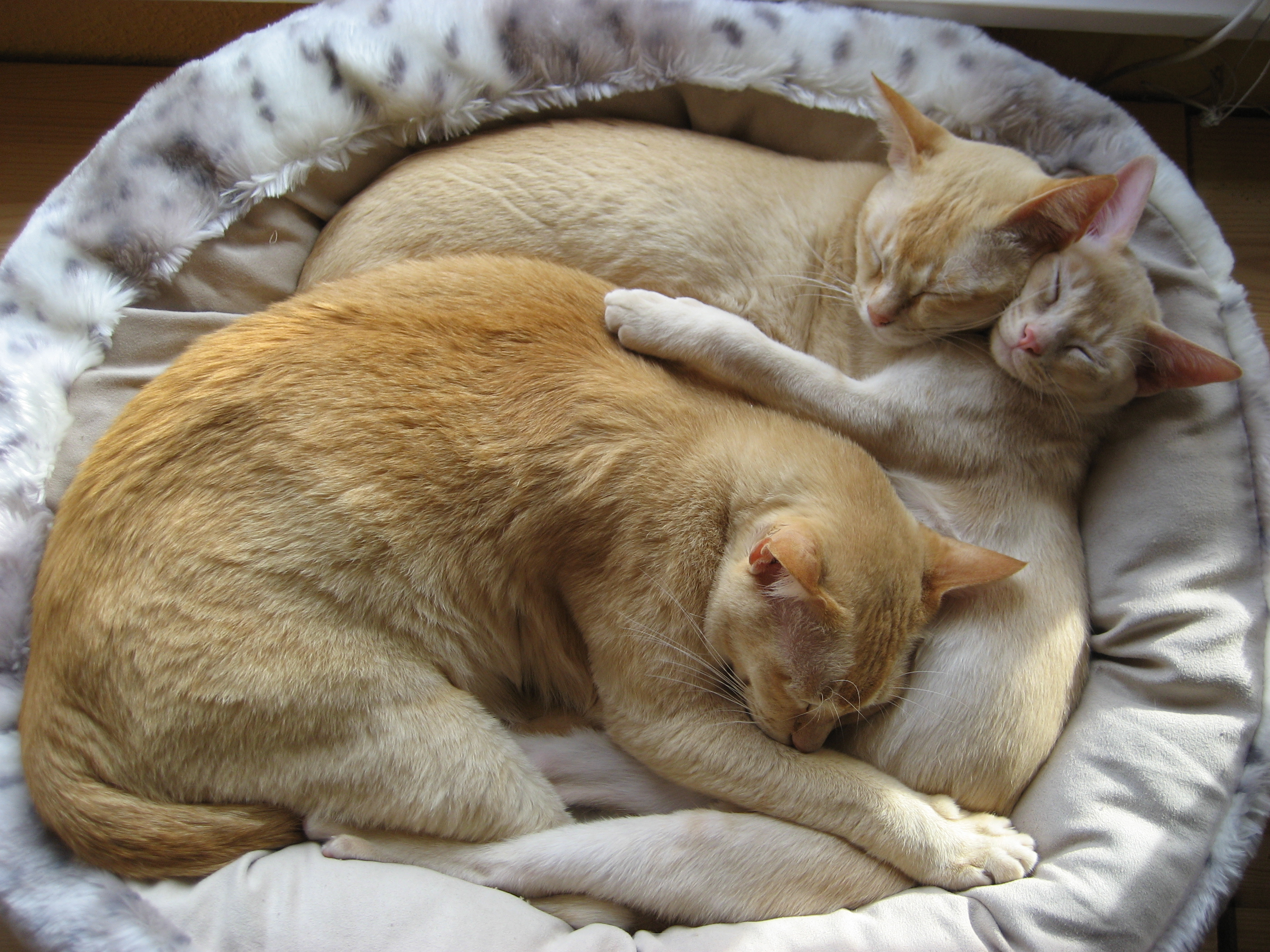
Cats in a cat bed

Pet furniture is furniture specifically designed for pets. Pet furniture became a popular trend in the early 21st century. Typical pieces include pet beds, doghouses, hammocks, dog coolers, cat trees, parrot tents and extravagant play equipment. Pet beds are produced in several forms, including flat mattress-style beds and round or doughnut-shaped beds with raised edges.

In 2008, James Stephenson and Jason R. Rich cited high-end furniture for cats and dogs as one of the best categories of products to buy and sell for big profits. Home-crafted furniture for pets has also become popular.
