= Invasion of Yugoslavia order of battle: Axis =

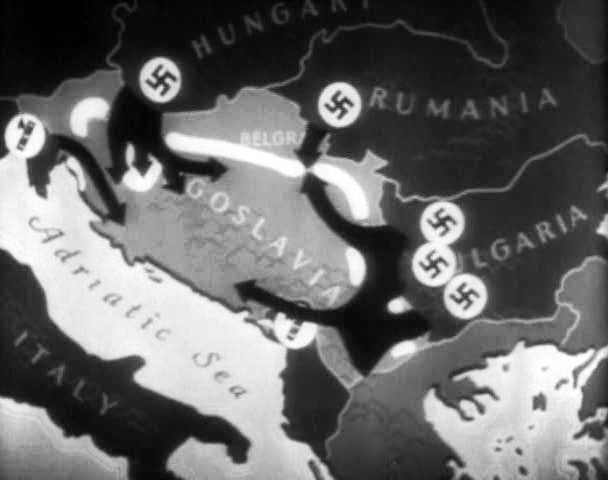
The German-led Axis invasion of Yugoslavia as shown in the United States government Why We Fight documentary series

The Axis order of battle for the invasion of Yugoslavia was made up of the various operational formations of the German Wehrmacht and Waffen-SS, Italian Armed Forces and Hungarian Armed Forces that participated in the invasion of Yugoslavia during World War II, commencing on 6 April 1941. It involved the German 2nd Army, with elements of the 12th Army and a panzer group combined with overwhelming Luftwaffe (German Air Force) support. The eighteen German divisions included five panzer divisions, two motorised infantry divisions and two mountain divisions. The German force also included two well-equipped independent motorised regiments and was supported by over 800 aircraft. The Italian 2nd Army and 9th Army committed a total of 22 divisions, and the Royal Italian Air Force (Italian: Regia Aeronautica) had over 650 aircraft available to support the invasion. The Hungarian 3rd Army also participated, with support from the Royal Hungarian Air Force (Hungarian: Magyar Királyi Honvéd Légierő, MKHL).

The Axis ground forces had effectively surrounded the Kingdom of Yugoslavia before the invasion began. The German 2nd Army, consisting of one motorised, one mountain, and two infantry corps was concentrated in southwestern Hungary and southeastern Austria, poised to drive south and east. One motorised corps of the German 12th Army was assembled near Sofia, Bulgaria, along with one motorised corps of the First Panzer Group, and these formations were assigned the task of striking the strongest Yugoslav formations stationed along the eastern border of the country. A further motorised corps was deployed near Timișoara in western Romania, ready to thrust south into the Banat region. The Italian 2nd Army, consisting of one fast (Italian: celere) corps, one motorised corps and three infantry corps was assembled in northeastern Italy, with the task of driving southeast down the Dalmatian coast. The Italian 9th Army, comprising two corps and a sector defence command, was stationed in occupied northern Albania, and its stance was largely defensive. The Hungarian 3rd Army was concentrated along the Yugoslav border largely between the Danube and the Tisza, with the objective of seizing the Bačka and Baranja regions.

German, Italian and Hungarian air support was concentrated in Austria, Italy, southern Hungary, southern Romania, western Bulgaria and Albania. In total, over 1,500 Axis aircraft were available to support the invasion. Naval forces were limited to a few destroyers of the Royal Italian Navy (Italian: Regia Marina) operating in the Adriatic Sea.

== German ==
=== German land forces ===
The German formations committed to the invasion of Yugoslavia included over 337,000 men, and more than 2,000 mortars, 1,500 artillery pieces, 1,100 anti-tank guns, 875 tanks, and 740 other armoured fighting vehicles. The German land forces were under the overall direction of the commander of the German Army Generalfeldmarschall (Field Marshal) Walther von Brauchitsch.

==== 2nd Army ====
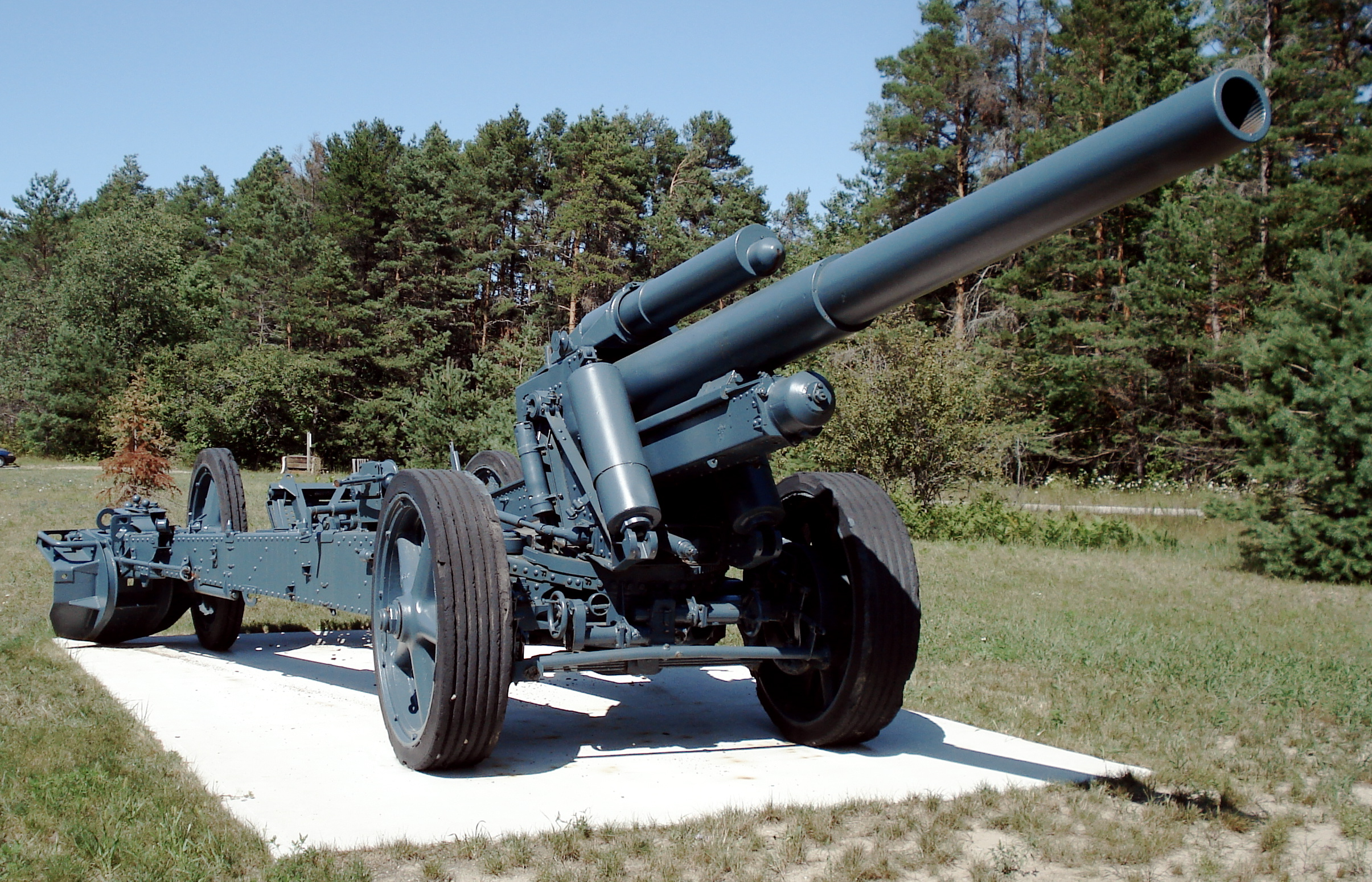
The German 150mm sFH18 heavy howitzer was used by heavy artillery battalions during the invasion of Yugoslavia

The German 2nd Army was commanded by Generaloberst (General) Maximilian von Weichs, consisted of one motorised, one mountain, and two infantry corps, and was assembled in southwestern Hungary and southeastern Austria. The LII Infantry Corps suffered significant delays in deploying to its assembly area and was initially held in reserve. According to Schreiber, Stegemann and Vogel, three panzer divisions, four infantry divisions and one motorised infantry division were planned as reserves for the 2nd Army, but they did not participate in the fighting in Yugoslavia. According to Niehorster, these divisions were held as theatre reserves or were allocated to various formations. (Note: According to Schreiber, Stegemann, and Vogel, the divisions planned to be part of the 2nd Army reserve that did not reach Yugoslavia were the 4th, 12th and 19th Panzer divisions, the 20th Motorised Infantry Division, and the 100th, 169th, 179th, and 197th Infantry divisions. According to Niehorster, the three panzer divisions and the 100th Light Infantry Division were held as theatre reserves, the 169th and 197th Infantry divisions were assigned to 2nd Army. Niehorster does not mention the 20th Motorised Infantry Division or 179th Infantry Division.) 2nd Army was supported by three bridging battalions and a road construction battalion.

Composition of German 2nd Army
Corps	Commander	Assembly area	Division
XXXXVI Motorised	General der Panzertruppe; Heinrich von Vietinghoff	Nagykanizsa, southwest Hungary	8th Panzer Division
XXXXVI Motorised	General der Panzertruppe; Heinrich von Vietinghoff	Nagykanizsa, southwest Hungary	14th Panzer Division
XXXXVI Motorised	General der Panzertruppe; Heinrich von Vietinghoff	Nagykanizsa, southwest Hungary	16th Motorised Infantry Division
XXXXIX Mountain	General der Infanterie; Ludwig Kübler	southeast of Klagenfurt, Austria	1st Mountain Division
XXXXIX Mountain	General der Infanterie; Ludwig Kübler	southeast of Klagenfurt, Austria	79th Infantry Division (Note: According to Niehorster, the 79th Infantry Division was allocated to the LII Infantry Corps.)
XXXXIX Mountain	General der Infanterie; Ludwig Kübler	southeast of Klagenfurt, Austria	538th Frontier Guard Division
LI Infantry	General der Infanterie; Hans-Wolfgang Reinhard	Leibnitz, Austria	101st Light Infantry Division (Note: Only elements of the 101st Light Infantry Division were assigned to LI Infantry Corps on 5 April 1941. The remainder was not assigned until 10 April.)
LI Infantry	General der Infanterie; Hans-Wolfgang Reinhard	Leibnitz, Austria	132nd Infantry Division
LI Infantry	General der Infanterie; Hans-Wolfgang Reinhard	Leibnitz, Austria	183rd Infantry Division
LII Infantry (Note: According to Schreiber, Stegemann, and Vogel, the LII Infantry Corps was only planned for assignment to the 2nd Army on 13 April, and did not actually take over command of any formations until 15 April, when it took command of the 125th Infantry Division and elements of the 101st Light Infantry Division.)	General der Infanterie; Kurt von Briesen	Leibnitz, Austria	125th Infantry Division (Note: According to Schreiber, Stegemann, and Vogel, the 125th Infantry Division did not reach Yugoslavia during the fighting.)

XXXXVI Motorised Corps was supported by three motorised heavy artillery battalions, a motorised pioneer battalion, a road construction battalion, six bridging columns, and two Luftwaffe anti-aircraft battalions. XXXXIX Mountain Corps included two motorised heavy artillery battalions and a road construction battalion. LI Infantry Corps included seven motorised heavy artillery battalions, two assault gun battalions, two motorised pioneer battalions, two bridging battalions, two road construction battalions, and twelve bridging columns.

==== 12th Army ====
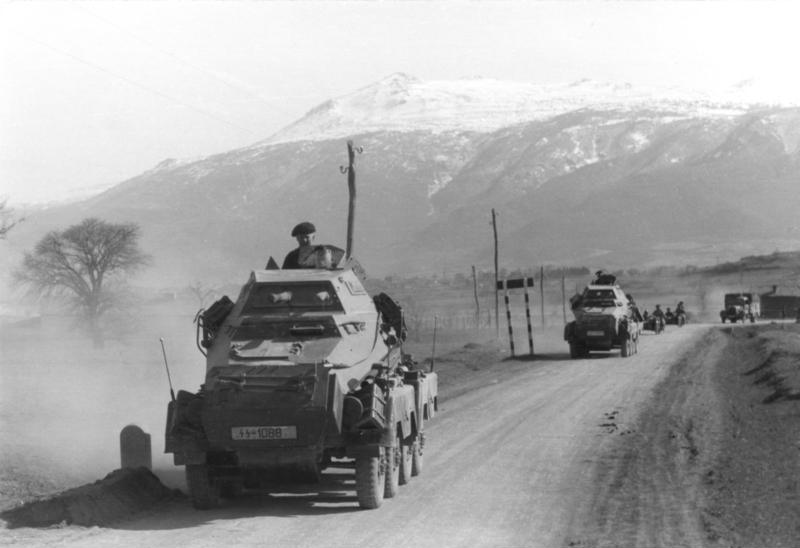
An eight-wheeled Sd.Kfz. 231 armoured car of the Leibstandarte SS Adolf Hitler in Yugoslav Macedonia in 1941

The German 12th Army was commanded by Generalfeldmarschall Wilhelm List, and consisted of one mountain, three infantry and two motorised corps. (Note: According to Niehorster, XXXXI Motorised Corps was assigned to the First Panzer Group.) Most of the 12th Army was deployed along the Bulgarian-Greek border in preparation for the invasion of Greece, and of the corps commanded by List, only the two motorised corps were committed to the invasion of Yugoslavia. For the first phase of the invasion of Yugoslavia, the First Panzer Group was also assigned to the 12th Army.

Corps of the 12th Army committed to the invasion of Yugoslavia
Corps	Commander	Assembly area	Division or regiment
XXXX Motorised Corps	General der Panzertruppe; Georg Stumme	Kyustendil southwest of Sofia, Bulgaria	9th Panzer Division
XXXX Motorised Corps	General der Panzertruppe; Georg Stumme	Kyustendil southwest of Sofia, Bulgaria	73rd Infantry Division
XXXX Motorised Corps	General der Panzertruppe; Georg Stumme	Kyustendil southwest of Sofia, Bulgaria	Leibstandarte SS Adolf Hitler
XXXXI Motorised Corps	General der Panzertruppe; Georg-Hans Reinhardt	near Timișoara, in western Romania	SS Motorised Infantry Division Reich
XXXXI Motorised Corps	General der Panzertruppe; Georg-Hans Reinhardt	near Timișoara, in western Romania	Großdeutschland Motorised Infantry Regiment

XXXX Motorised Corps was supported by one motorised anti-tank battalion, three motorised heavy artillery battalions, two motorised pioneer battalions, two bridging battalions, and three motorised bridging columns. XXXXI Motorised Corps included two motorised heavy artillery battalions and a motorised pioneer battalion.

===== First Panzer Group =====
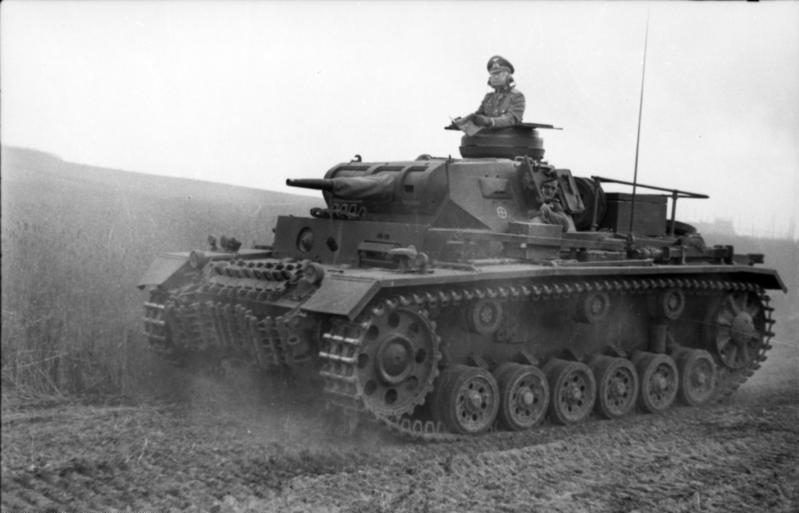
German Panzer III tank in Yugoslavia, 1941

The First Panzer Group was commanded by Generaloberst Paul Ludwig Ewald von Kleist, and according to Schreiber, Stegemann and Vogel, it consisted of XIV Motorised Corps with two panzer divisions, one mountain, one motorised infantry and one infantry division. According to Niehorster, the XXXXI Motorised Corps was also assigned to First Panzer Group. (Note: According to Schreiber, Stegemann and Vogel, the First Panzer Group consisted of the XIV Motorised Corps comprising the 5th and 11th Panzer divisions, 4th Mountain Division, 60th Motorised Infantry Division and 294th Infantry Division. According to Niehorster, the First Panzer Group consisted of the XIV Motorised Corps (comprising the 5th and 11th Panzer Divisions), XXXXI Motorised Corps (comprising the SS Motorised Infantry Division Reich and the Großdeutschland Motorised Infantry Regiment), and the 4th Mountain Division and 294th Infantry Division, with the 60th Motorised Infantry Division assigned to 12th Army.) It assembled northwest of Sofia, Bulgaria.

First Panzer Group
Corps	Commander	Division
XIV Motorised	General der Infanterie; Gustav Anton von Wietersheim	5th Panzer Division
XIV Motorised	General der Infanterie; Gustav Anton von Wietersheim	11th Panzer Division
XIV Motorised	General der Infanterie; Gustav Anton von Wietersheim	294th Infantry Division
XIV Motorised	General der Infanterie; Gustav Anton von Wietersheim	4th Mountain Division
XIV Motorised	General der Infanterie; Gustav Anton von Wietersheim	60th Motorised Infantry Division

The First Panzer Group was supported by one motorised heavy artillery battalion, one motorised pioneer battalion, one pioneer battalion, two bridging battalions, and two bridging columns. Supporting units of XIV Motorised Corps included two motorised heavy artillery battalions, a motorised pioneer battalion, two bridging columns and one Luftwaffe motorised anti-aircraft battalion.

==== Commanders ====
Major German formation commanders

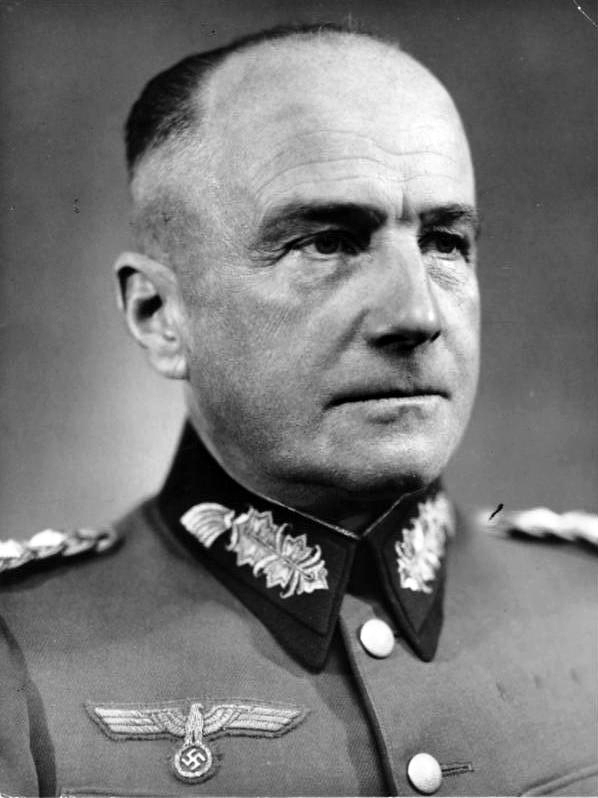
Generalfeldmarschall Walther von Brauchitsch was in overall command of German land forces

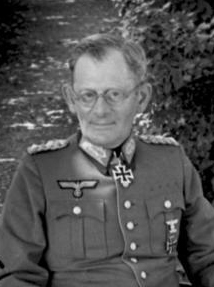
Generaloberst Maximilian von Weichs commanded the 2nd Army

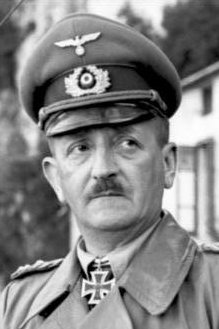
General der Panzertruppe Heinrich von Vietinghoff commanded the XXXXVI Motorised Corps

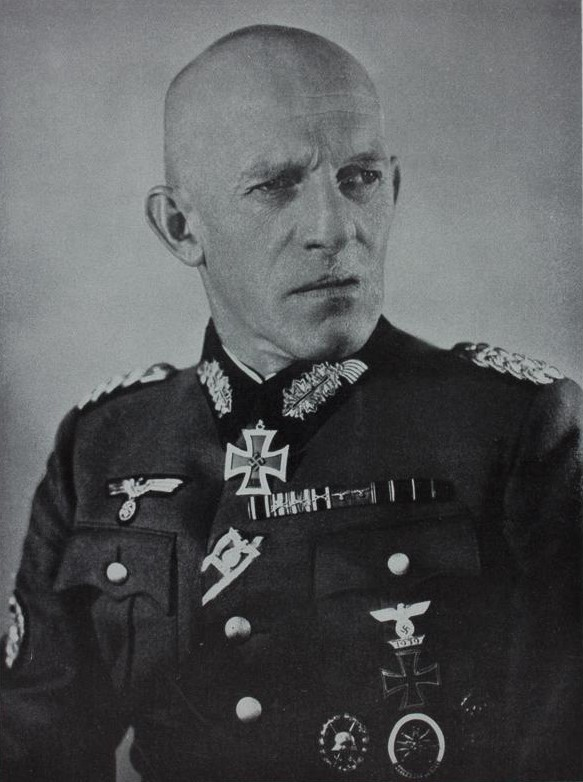
General der Infanterie Ludwig Kübler commanded the XXXXIX Mountain Corps

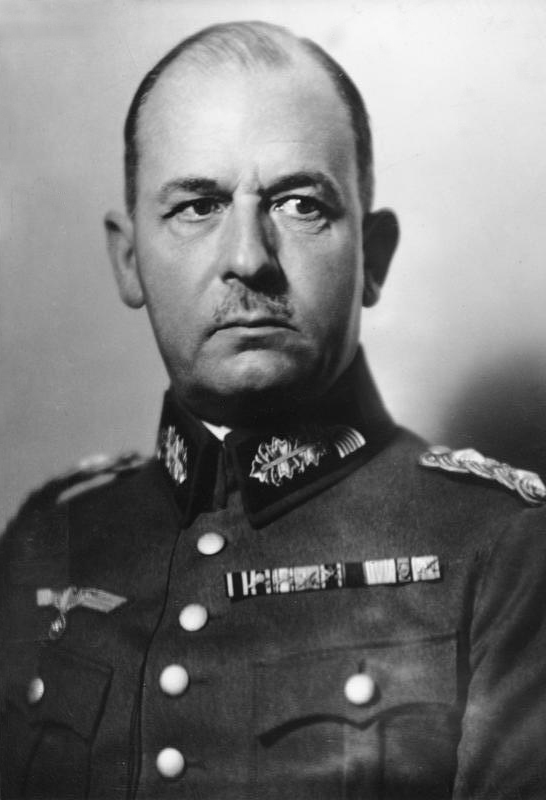
Generalfeldmarschall Wilhelm List commanded the 12th Army

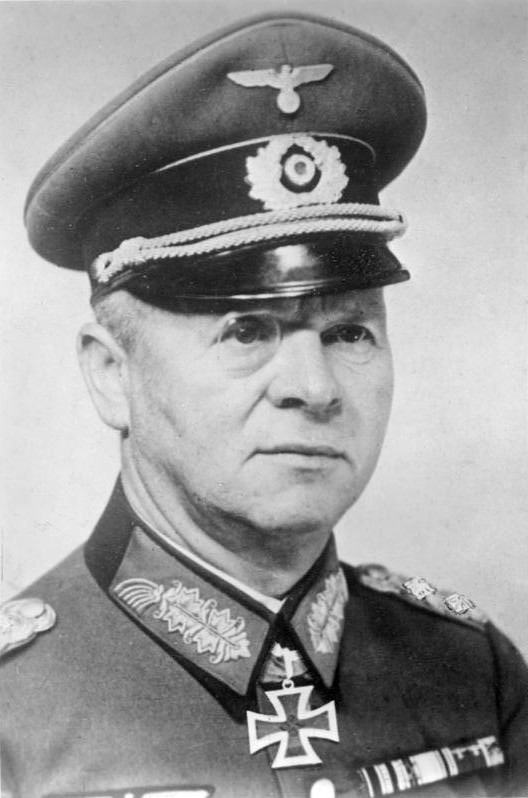
General der Panzertruppe Georg Stumme commanded the XXXX Motorised Corps

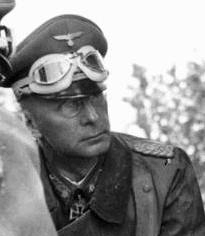
General der Panzertruppe Georg-Hans Reinhardt commanded the XXXXI Motorised Corps

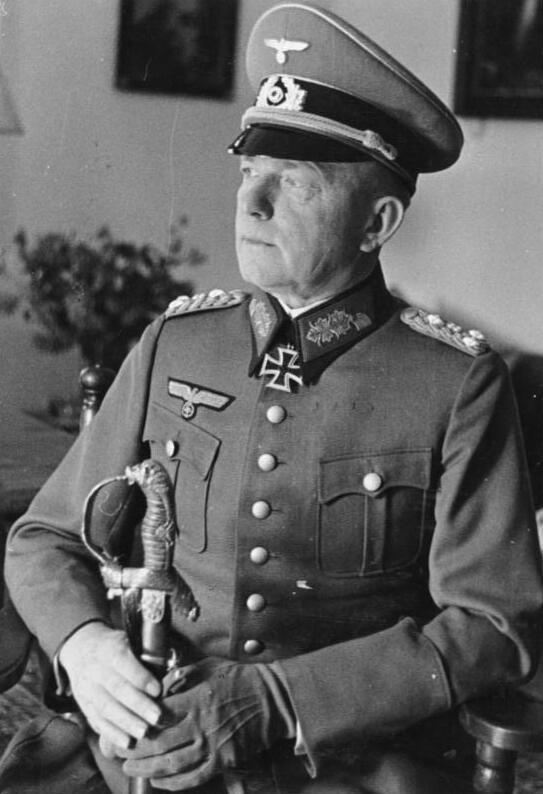
Generaloberst Paul Ludwig Ewald von Kleist commanded the First Panzer Group

=== German Air Force ===
The Luftwaffe operated out of bases in Austria, Romania and Bulgaria during the invasion of Yugoslavia. In total, the Germans had over 809 aircraft available to support the invasion of Yugoslavia, more than half of which were positioned in Bulgaria to support the simultaneous invasion of Greece. In total, the Germans fielded 296 fighter aircraft, 89 light bombers, 26 medium bombers and 23 reconnaissance aircraft, and more than 318 dive bombers and 57 heavy fighters. In addition, a reconnaissance squadron equipped with Henschel Hs 126 two-seater reconnaissance aircraft was attached to most of the corps headquarters and every panzer division of the German ground forces. Luftwaffe anti-aircraft units were also attached to the German land forces.

==== 4th Air Fleet ====
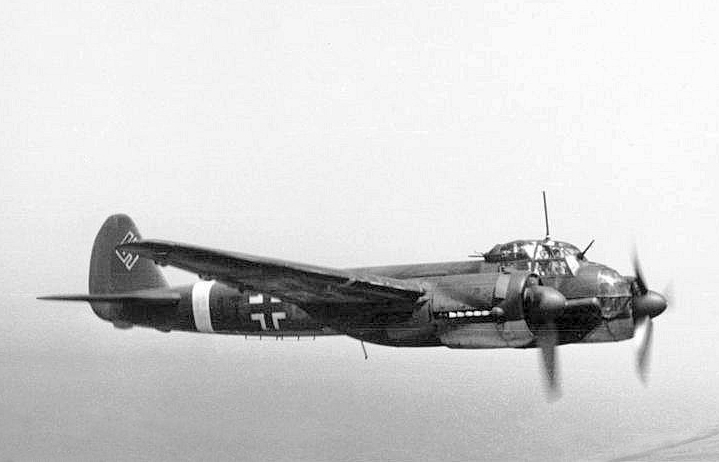
Junkers Ju 88A divebombers were operated by the 51st Bomber Wing

The Luftwaffe 4th Air Fleet (German: Luftflotte IV) was commanded by General der Flieger (Lieutenant General) Alexander Löhr, had its headquarters in Vienna, and direct command units based on airfields in western Austria. These units included one squadron (German: Staffel) of the 121st Reconnaissance Group (German: Aufklärungsgruppe 121), the entire 51st Bomber Wing (German: Kampfgeschwader 51, KG 51), and four bomber groups (German: Kampfgruppen) drawn from the 2nd, 3rd and 4th Bomber Wings (KG 2, KG 3 and KG 4). In total, the 4th Air Fleet had 25 medium bombers, 89 light bombers, 55 dive bombers, 6 reconnaissance aircraft and 1 heavy fighter available in Austria to support the invasion of Yugoslavia.

Composition of 4th Air Fleet
Unit	Location	Aircraft type
4th Squadron/121st Long Range Reconnaissance Group	Seyring	6 × Junkers Ju 88D long-range photo-reconnaissance aircraft 1 × Messerschmitt Bf 110C heavy fighter
Headquarters 2nd Bomber Wing	Zwölfaxing	6 × Dornier Do 17Z light bombers
I Group/2nd Bomber Wing	Zwölfaxing	28 × Dornier Do 17Z light bombers
III Group/2nd Bomber Wing	Zwölfaxing	29 × Dornier Do 17Z light bombers
III Group/3rd Bomber Wing	Münchendorf	26 × Dornier Do 17Z light bombers
II Group/4th Bomber Wing	Aspern	25 × Heinkel He 111P medium bombers
Headquarters 51st Bomber Wing	Wiener Neustadt	1 × Junkers Ju 88A dive bomber
I Group/51st Bomber Wing	Wiener Neustadt	17 × Junkers Ju 88A dive bombers
II Group/51st Bomber Wing	Wiener Neustadt	18 × Junkers Ju 88A dive bombers
III Group/51st Bomber Wing	Schwechat	19 × Junkers Ju 88A dive bombers

==== Fliegerführer Graz ====
Fliegerführer Graz was commanded by Oberstleutnant (Lieutenant Colonel) Karl Christ, commander of the 3rd Dive Bomber Wing (German: Sturzkampfgeschwader 3, StG 3). It was located in Graz, Austria, and consisted of the headquarters and II Group of StG 3, the headquarters and II Group (German: Jagdgruppe) of the 54th Fighter Wing (German: Jagdgeschwader 54, JG 54) (less one squadron), and I Group of the 27th Fighter Wing (JG 27). In total, Fliegerführer Graz had 54 fighters, 1 medium bomber and 35 dive bombers available to support the invasion of Yugoslavia.

Composition of Fliegerführer Graz
Unit	Aircraft type
Headquarters 3rd Dive Bomber Wing	1 × Junkers Ju 87B dive bomber 1 x Heinkel He 111H medium bomber
II Group/3rd Dive Bomber Wing	34 × Junkers Ju 87B dive bombers
Headquarters 54th Fighter Wing	3 × Messerschmitt Bf 109E fighters
II Group/54th Fighter Wing (part)	24 × Messerschmitt Bf 109E fighters
I Group/27th Fighter Wing	27 × Messerschmitt Bf 109E fighters

==== Fliegerführer Arad ====
Fliegerführer Arad was commanded by Oberstleutnant Clemens Graf von Schönborn-Wiesentheid, commander of the 77th Dive Bomber Wing (StG 77). With its headquarters in Arad, Romania, it consisted of the headquarters, I and III Groups of StG 77, headquarters, II and III Groups of the 77th Fighter Wing (JG 77), one squadron of II Group of JG 54, III Group of JG 54 and I Group of the 26th Heavy Fighter Wing (German: Zerstörergeschwader 26, ZG 26). In total, Fliegerführer Arad had 116 fighters, 31 heavy fighters and 68 dive bombers available to support the invasion of Yugoslavia.

Composition of Fliegerführer Arad
Unit	Location	Aircraft type
Headquarters 77th Dive Bomber Wing	Arad	3 × Junkers Ju 87B dive bombers 4 × Messerschmitt Bf 109E fighters
I Group/77th Dive Bomber Wing	Arad	33 × Junkers Ju 87B dive bombers 1 × Messerschmitt Bf 110C heavy fighter
III Group/77th Dive Bomber Wing	Arad	32 × Junkers Ju 87B dive bombers
Headquarters 77th Fighter Wing	Deta, Romania	6 × Messerschmitt Bf 109E fighters
II Group/77th Fighter Wing augmented by 6th Squadron/II Group/54th Fighter Wing	Deta	34 × Messerschmitt Bf 109E fighters
III Group/77th Fighter Wing augmented by 4th Squadron/II Group/54th Fighter Wing	Deta	33 × Messerschmitt Bf 109E fighters
5th Squadron and headquarters of II Group/54th Fighter Wing	Arad	Messerschmitt Bf 109E fighters
III Group/54th Fighter Wing	Arad	39 × Messerschmitt Bf 109E fighters
I Group/26th Heavy Fighter Wing	Szeged, Hungary	30 × Messerschmitt Bf 110C/D heavy fighters

==== VIII Air Corps ====
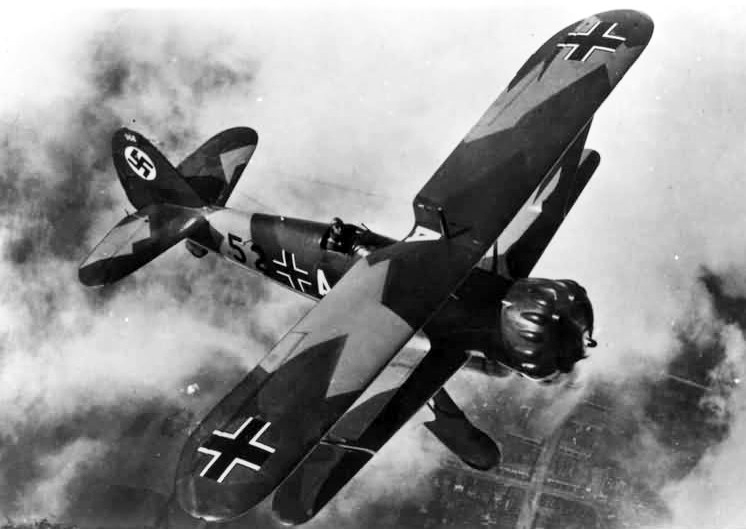
Henschel Hs 123 dive bombers were operated by the 10th Dive Bomber Squadron of the 2nd Demonstration Wing

The VIII Air Corps (German: Fliegerkorps VIII) was commanded by General der Flieger Wolfram Freiherr von Richthofen, who had operational control of all air operations for the invasion. With its headquarters in Gorna Dzhumaya, Bulgaria, it was based at various airfields in western Bulgaria, and consisted of one squadron of the 11th Reconnaissance Group, the headquarters, I and II Groups of the 2nd Dive Bomber Wing (StG 2), I Group of StG 3, the headquarters, II and III Groups of the 27th Fighter Wing, a fighter group and a ground attack group from the 1st Demonstration Wing (German: Lehrgeschwader 1, LG 1), and a reinforced dive bomber group from the 2nd Demonstration Wing. In total, the VIII Air Corps had 126 fighters and 17 reconnaissance aircraft, and more than 25 heavy fighters and 160 dive bombers available to support the invasions of both Yugoslavia and Greece.

Composition of VIII Air Corps
Unit	Location	Aircraft type
Headquarters 2nd Dive Bomber Wing	Belitsa and Krainici	4 × Junkers Ju 87B dive bombers 6 × Dornier Do 17P long-range photo-reconnaissance aircraft
I Group/2nd Dive Bomber Wing	Belitsa and Krainici	30 × Junkers Ju 87B dive bombers 9 × Junkers Ju 87R long-range dive bombers
III Group/2nd Dive Bomber Wing	Belitsa and Krainici	35 × Junkers Ju 87B dive bombers
I Group/3rd Dive Bomber Wing	Belitsa	30 × Junkers Ju 87B dive bombers 9 × Junkers Ju 87R long-range dive bombers
I Group/1st Dive Bomber Wing	Krainici	23 × Junkers Ju 87R long-range dive bombers
II Dive Bomber Group/2nd Demonstration Wing	Vrazhdebna	23 × Messerschmitt Bf 109E fighters
10th Dive Bomber Squadron/2nd Demonstration Wing	Krainici	20 × Henschel Hs 123A biplane dive bomber
II Group/26th Heavy Fighter Wing	Kraishte and Vrazhdebna	25 × Messerschmitt Bf 110C/E heavy fighters
Headquarters 27th Fighter Wing	Belitsa and Sofia	5 × Messerschmitt Bf 109E fighters
II Group/27th Fighter Wing	Belitsa and Sofia	37 × Messerschmitt Bf 109E fighters
III Group/27th Fighter Wing	Belitsa and Sofia	39 × Messerschmitt Bf 109E fighters
I Fighter Group/2nd Demonstration Wing	Vrazhdebna	22 × Messerschmitt Bf 109E fighters
I Group/1st Demonstration Wing	Vrazhdebna	Junkers Ju 88A dive bombers
2nd Squadron/11th Long Range Reconnaissance Group	Sofia	11 × Dornier Do 17P long-range photo-reconnaissance aircraft
7th Squadron/2nd Demonstration Wing	Vrazhdebna	Messerschmitt Bf 110C heavy fighters
7th Sea Rescue Squadron	Varna	various floatplanes
IV Group/1st Transport Group	Krumovo	Junkers Ju 52/3m transport aircraft

==== X Air Corps ====
The X Air Corps (German: Fliegerkorps X) was based in Sicily, and consisted of four bomber groups, one heavy fighter group and one fighter squadron with a total of 168 aircraft. It was available to provide on-call support to the 4th Air Fleet as required, but only a few units played any part in supporting the invasion because the primary task of X Air Corps was interdicting Allied supply convoys to Malta. Units earmarked for support to the invasion included 7th Squadron of 26th Fighter Wing (JG 26) equipped with Messerschmitt Bf 109E fighters, and III Group of ZG 26, flying Messerschmitt Bf 110C/D heavy fighters.

==== Commanders ====
Major German Luftwaffe commanders

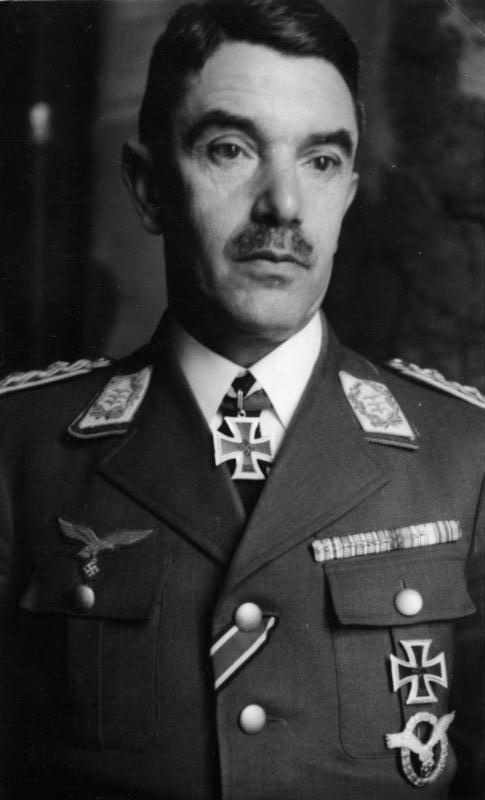
General der Flieger Alexander Löhr commanded the 4th Air Fleet during the invasion

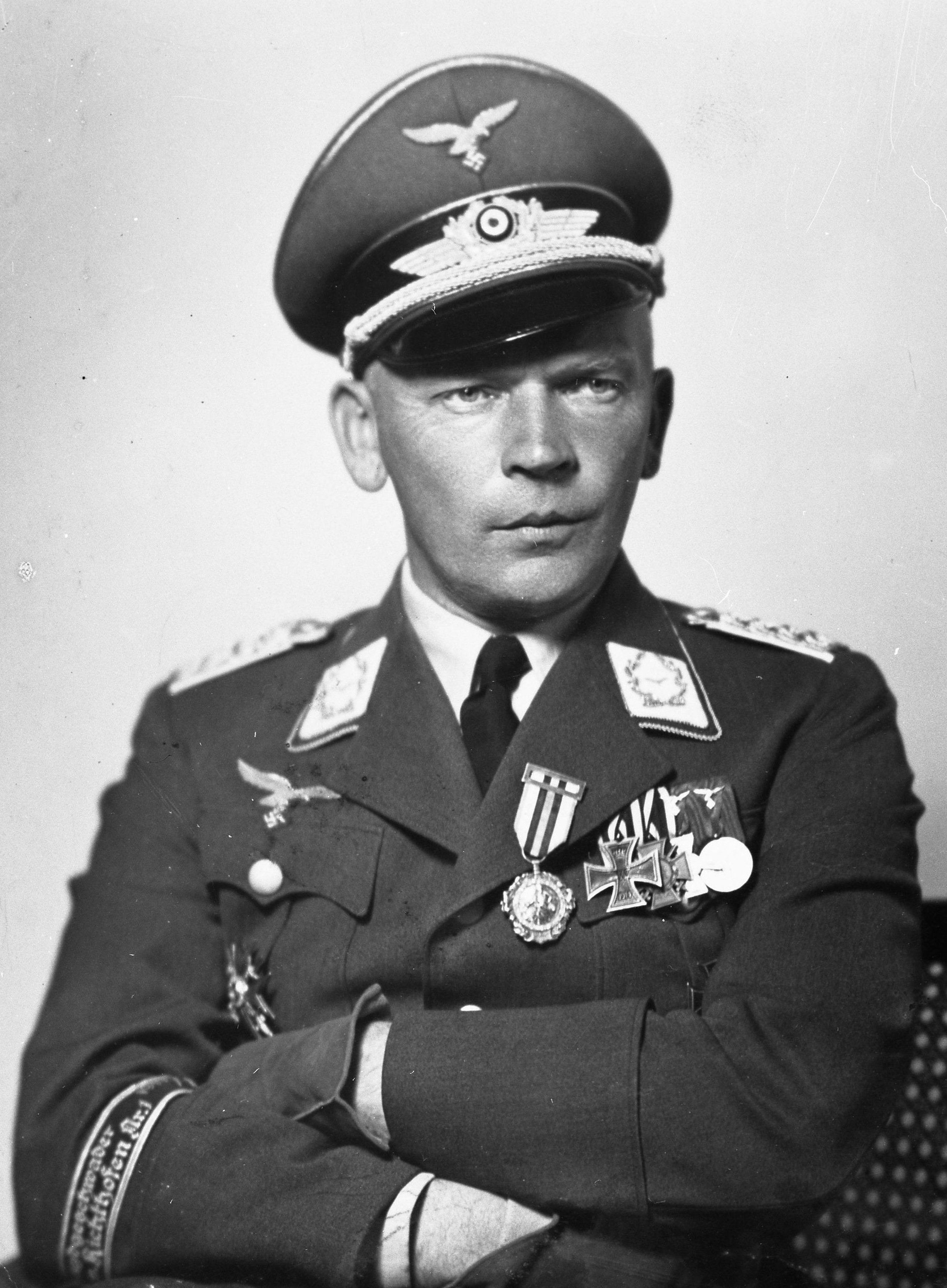
General der Flieger Wolfram Freiherr von Richthofen commanded the VIII Air Corps

== Italian ==
=== Italian ground forces ===
The Italian 2nd Army and 9th Army committed a total of 22 divisions to the operation, comprising around 300,000 troops. The Italian ground forces included the Italian garrison of Zara, which was an Italian enclave on the Dalmatian coast.

==== 2nd Army ====
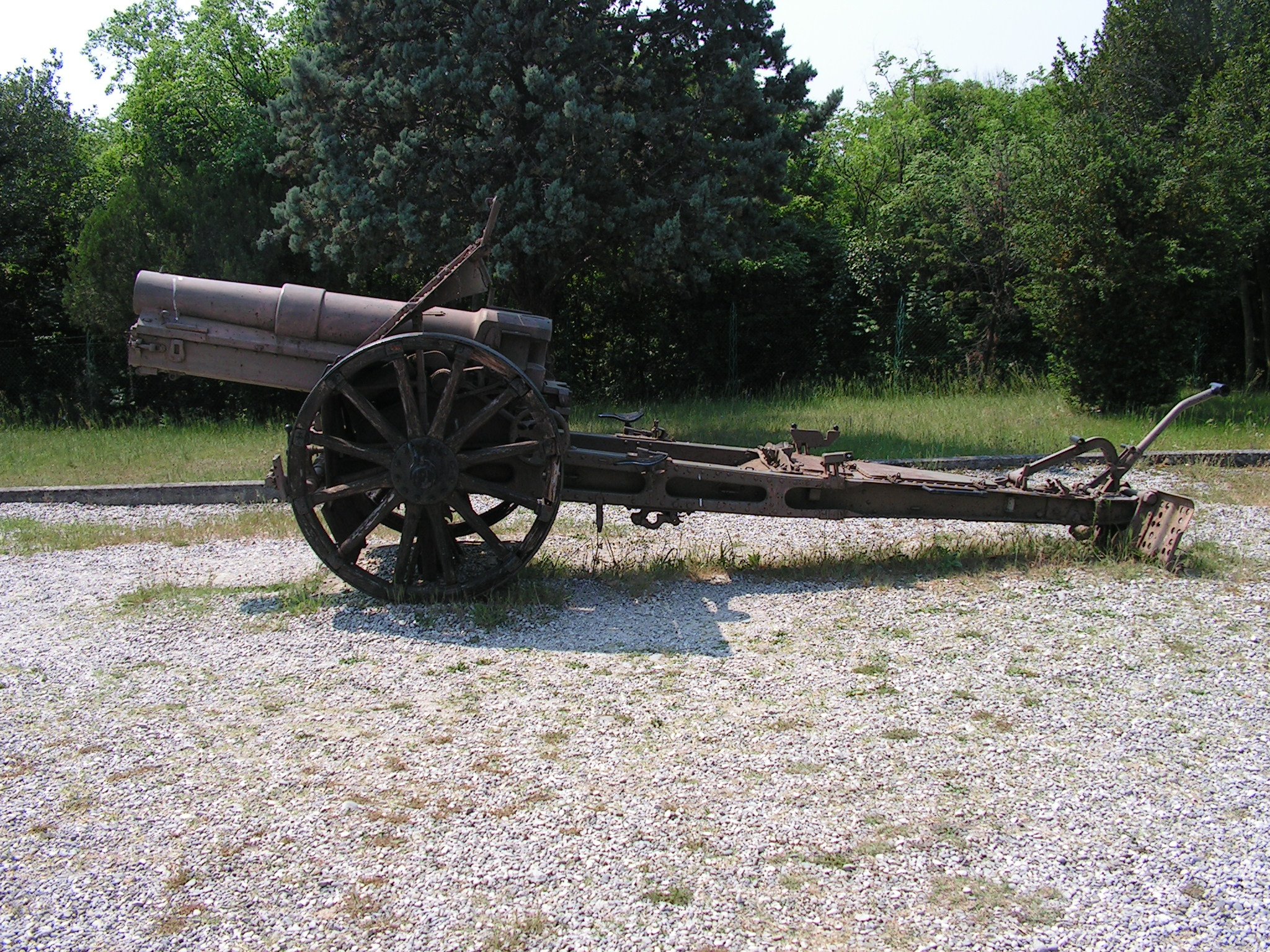
The World War I-vintage Obice 149/13 heavy howitzer was used by several Italian artillery battalions during the invasion of Yugoslavia

The Italian 2nd Army (Italian: 2° Armata) was commanded by Generale d’Armata (General) Vittorio Ambrosio, and consisted of one fast (Italian: celere) corps, one motorised corps and three infantry corps, and was assembled in northeastern Italy. The 2nd Army was supported by a motorised engineer regiment including three bridging battalions, a chemical battalion, fifteen territorial battalions, and two garrison battalions.

Composition of Italian 2nd Army
Corps	Commander	Division
Celere Corps	Generale di Corpo d'Armata; Federico Ferrari Orsi	1st Cavalry Division "Eugenio di Savoia"
Celere Corps	Generale di Corpo d'Armata; Federico Ferrari Orsi	2nd Cavalry Division "Emanuele Filiberto Testa di Ferro"
Celere Corps	Generale di Corpo d'Armata; Federico Ferrari Orsi	3rd Cavalry Division "Principe Amedeo Duca d'Aosta"
V Corps	Generale di Divisione; Riccardo Balocco	15th Infantry Division "Bergamo"
V Corps	Generale di Divisione; Riccardo Balocco	57th Infantry Division "Lombardia"
V Corps	Generale di Divisione; Riccardo Balocco	Guardia alla Frontiera (Border Guard) (Note: This divisional-sized Border Guard formation consisted of three regimental-sized Border Guard Sectors based around the Timavo river, the Carnavo Gulf and the city of Fiume. It was supported by a Border Guard artillery regiment of seven battalions.)
VI Corps	Generale di Corpo d'Armata; Lorenzo Dalmazzo	12th Infantry Division "Sassari"
VI Corps	Generale di Corpo d'Armata; Lorenzo Dalmazzo	20th Infantry Division "Friuli"
VI Corps	Generale di Corpo d'Armata; Lorenzo Dalmazzo	26th Infantry Division "Assietta"
XI Corps	Generale di Divisione; Mario Robotti	3rd Infantry Division "Ravenna"
XI Corps	Generale di Divisione; Mario Robotti	13th Infantry Division "Re"
XI Corps	Generale di Divisione; Mario Robotti	14th Infantry Division "Isonzo"
XI Corps	Generale di Divisione; Mario Robotti	Guardia alla Frontiera (Border Guard) (Note: This divisional-sized Border Guard formation consisted of four regimental-sized Border Guard Sectors. It was supported by two Border Guard artillery regiments, one of a single battalion, and the other comprising twelve battalions.)
XI Corps	Generale di Divisione; Mario Robotti	3rd Alpine Group (Note: This regimental-sized group consisted of three Alpini battalions and a mountain artillery battalion.)
Motorised Corps	Generale di Corpo d'Armata; Francesco Zingales	9th Infantry Division "Pasubio"
Motorised Corps	Generale di Corpo d'Armata; Francesco Zingales	52nd Infantry Division "Torino"
Motorised Corps	Generale di Corpo d'Armata; Francesco Zingales	133rd Armoured Division "Littorio"

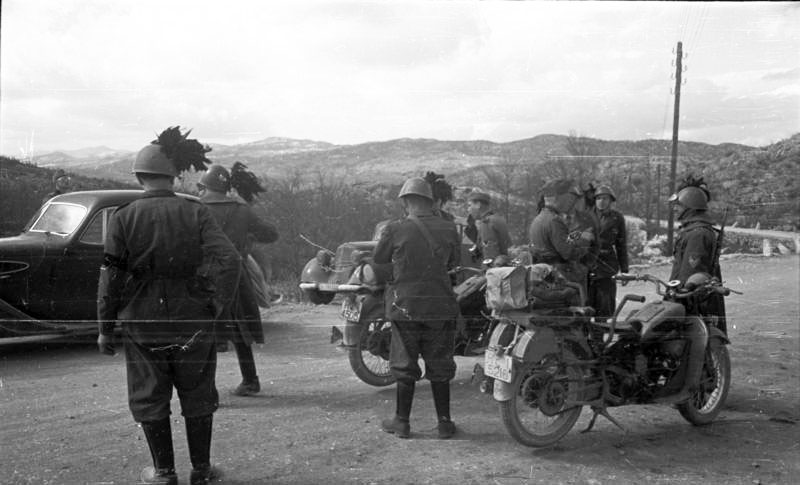
German troops and Italian Bersaglieri in Yugoslavia, 1941

V Corps support units included three motorised artillery regiments comprising thirteen battalions, four machine gun battalions (two motorised and two pack animal), three Blackshirt legions of battalion size, a motorised anti-aircraft battalion, a sapper assault battalion and a road construction battalion. VI Corps included four motorised artillery regiments with a total of sixteen battalions, two machine gun battalions (one motorised, one pack animal) and a motorised anti-aircraft regiment. XI Corps included one motorised artillery regiment comprising four battalions, three machine gun battalions (one motorised, one pack animal and one static), and six Blackshirt legions of battalion size. The Motorised Corps was supported by a motorised artillery regiment consisting of three battalions, and a motorised engineer battalion.

==== 9th Army ====
The elements of the Italian 9th Army (Italian: 9° Armata) that were involved in the campaign were commanded by Generale d’Armata (General) Alessandro Pirzio Biroli, and consisted of two infantry corps and some sector troops assembled in northern Albania.

Elements of Italian 9th Army
Corps	Commander	Division
XIV Corps	Generale di Divisione; Giovanni Vecchi	38th Infantry Division "Puglie"
XIV Corps	Generale di Divisione; Giovanni Vecchi	4th Alpine Division "Cuneense"
XVII Corps	Generale di Corpo d'Armata; Giuseppe Pafundi	18th Infantry Division "Messina"
XVII Corps	Generale di Corpo d'Armata; Giuseppe Pafundi	32nd Infantry Division "Marche"
XVII Corps	Generale di Corpo d'Armata; Giuseppe Pafundi	131st Armoured Division "Centauro"
Librazhd Sector	Generale di Corpo d'Armata; Gabriele Nasci	53rd Infantry Division "Arezzo"
Librazhd Sector	Generale di Corpo d'Armata; Gabriele Nasci	41st Infantry Division "Firenze"
Librazhd Sector	Generale di Corpo d'Armata; Gabriele Nasci	24th Infantry Division "Pinerolo"

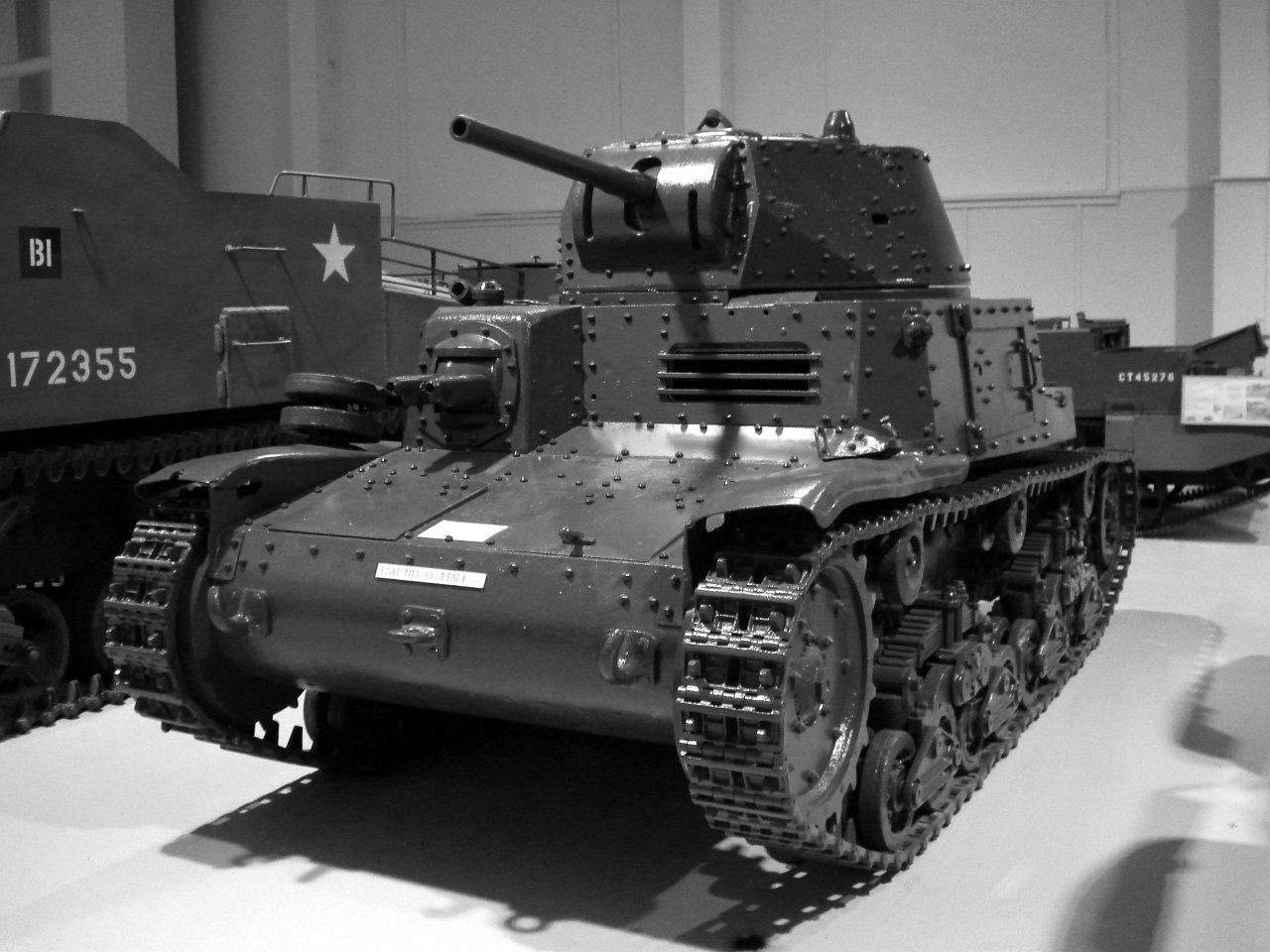
The Fiat M13/40 light tank was employed by the 131st Armoured Division Centauro and other Italian units during the invasion

XIV Corps was supported by a cavalry regiment, three Border Guard battalions, a Finance Guard battalion and two military police (Italian: Carabinieri Reali) battalions. The XVII Corps included the Diamanti Blackshirt group which incorporated six Blackshirt regiments comprising two battalions each, the Albanian-raised Skanderbeg Blackshirt regiment of two battalions, another Blackshirt regiment of two battalions, a cavalry regiment, a Bersaglieri motorcycle battalion, three Border Guard battalions, one Finance Guard battalion, a motorised artillery regiment of three battalions, a military police battalion, and a tank company equipped with Fiat M13/40 light tanks. The Librazhd Sector included a motorised artillery regiment of four battalions, a bicycle-mounted Bersaglieri regiment, a cavalry regiment, the Biscaccianti Blackshirt group which incorporated two Blackshirt regiments with a total of five battalions, the regimental-sized Agostini Blackshirt Forest Militia, and the Briscotto group, a regimental-sized formation consisting of one Alpini battalion and two Finance Guard battalions.

==== Zara garrison ====
The Zara garrison numbered about 9,000 men under the overall command of Generale di Brigata (Brigadier) Emilio Giglioli. The garrison consisted of two main groupings and an assortment of supporting units. The two main groupings were the regimental-sized Fronte a Terra (Land Front), which comprised three static machine gun battalions and a bicycle-mounted Bersaglieri battalion, and the battalion-strength Fronte a Mare (Sea Front), which consisted of two machine gun companies, an anti-aircraft battery, a coastal artillery battery and a naval artillery battery. Supporting units consisted of an artillery regiment of three battalions, two independent artillery battalions, a machine gun battalion, a motorised anti-aircraft battalion (less one battery), an engineer battalion, a company of Blackshirts, and a company of L3/35 tankettes.

==== Commanders ====
Major Italian commanders

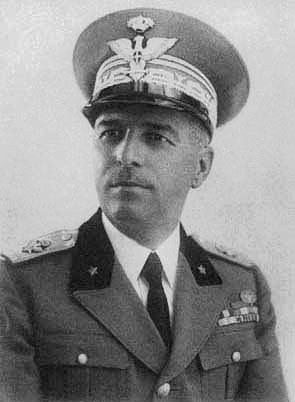
Generale d’Armata Vittorio Ambrosio commanded the Italian 2nd Army during the invasion

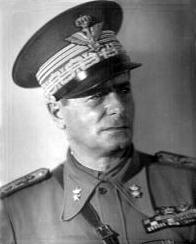
Generale d’Armata Alessandro Pirzio Biroli commanded the Italian 9th Army during the invasion

=== Royal Italian Air Force ===
The Royal Italian Air Force (Italian: Regia Aeronautica) operated out of bases in southeastern and northeastern Italy and Albania during the invasion of Yugoslavia. In total, the Italians had 658 aircraft available to support the invasion, 222 of which were positioned in Albania to also support the German invasion of Greece. These aircraft comprised 296 fighter aircraft, 40 dive bombers, 192 medium bombers, 12 bomber floatplanes and 118 reconnaissance aircraft.

==== 2nd Air Force ====
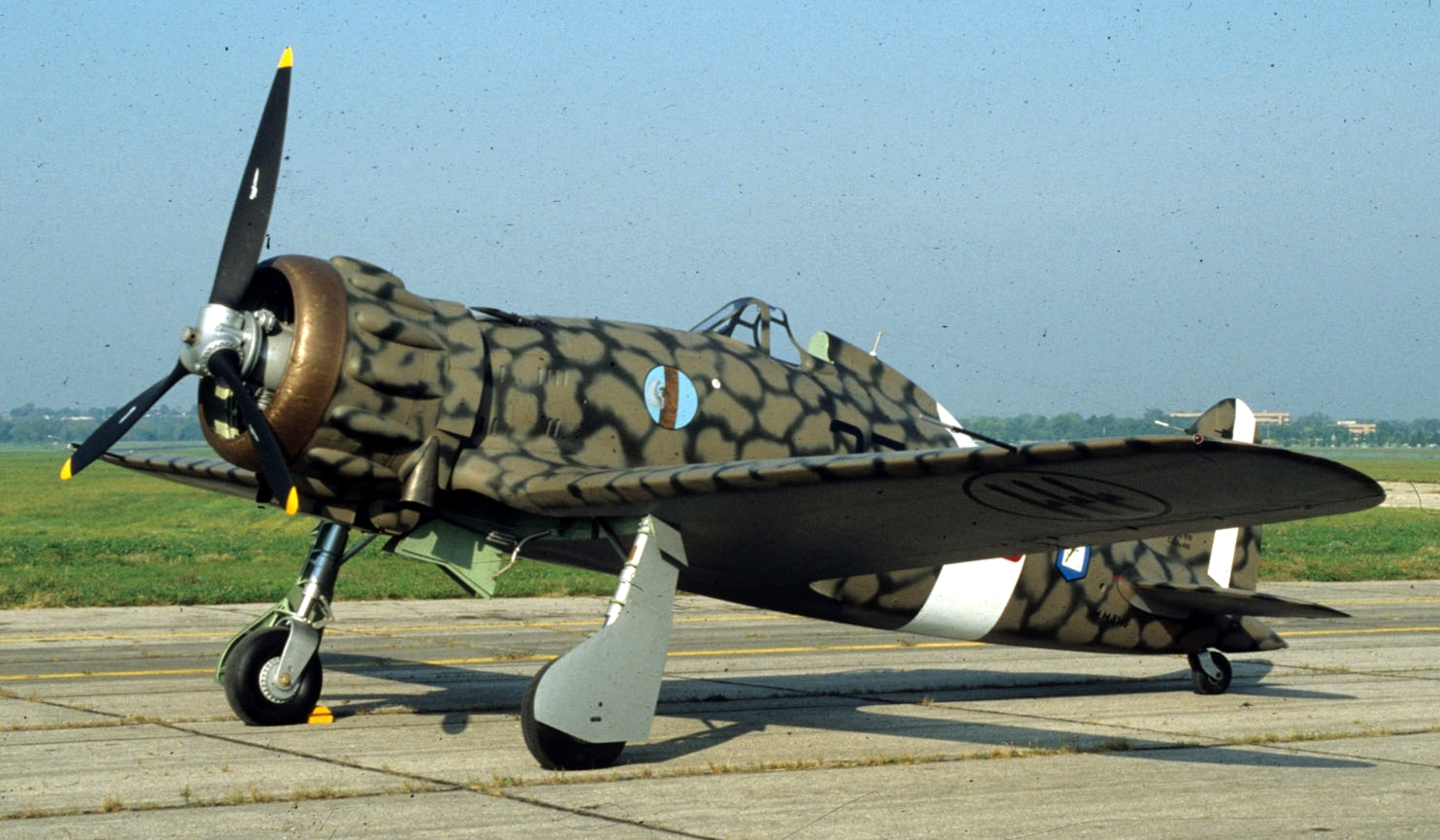
Macchi C.200 fighters were operated by several Italian fighter wings and independent fighter groups

The headquarters of the 2nd Air Force (Italian: 2nd Squadra Aerea) was at Padua, in northeastern Italy under the command of Generale di Squadra Aerea (Lieutenant General) Tullio Toccolini. It comprised two fighter wings, one bomber wing, two independent bomber groups, three reconnaissance groups and one independent reconnaissance squadron. In total, the 2nd Air Force had 90 fighters, 61 medium bombers and 49 reconnaissance aircraft available to support the invasion of Yugoslavia.

Composition of Italian 2nd Air Force
Unit	Location	Aircraft
4th Fighter Wing	Gorizia	46 × Macchi C.200 fighters
54th Fighter Wing	Treviso	44 × Macchi C.200 fighters
18th Bomber Wing	Aviano	32 × Fiat BR.20 medium bombers
25th Bomber Group	Forli	15 × Fiat BR.20 medium bombers
99th Bomber Group	Vicenza	14 × Fiat BR.20 medium bombers
61st Reconnaissance Group	Gorizia	8 × Caproni Ca.311 reconnaissance aircraft 8 × IMAM Ro.37bis reconnaissance biplanes
63rd Reconnaissance Group	Udine	14 × IMAM Ro.37bis reconnaissance biplanes
71st Reconnaissance Group	Udine	12 × IMAM Ro.37bis reconnaissance biplanes
128th Reconnaissance Squadron	Gorizia	7 × Caproni Ca.311 reconnaissance aircraft

==== 4th Air Force ====
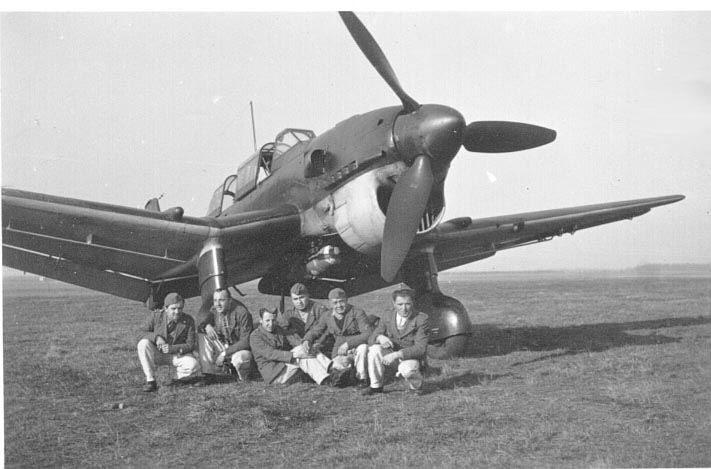
Junkers Ju 87 dive bombers were operated by two Italian dive bomber groups

The headquarters of the 4th Air Force (Italian: 4th Squadra Aerea) was at Bari, in southern Italy under the command of Generale di Squadra Aerea Augusto Bonola. It comprised two independent fighter groups and one independent fighter squadron, four bomber wings, one combined bomber and naval bomber wing, two independent bomber groups and one independent dive bomber equipped with German Junkers Ju 87B Stuka aircraft. In total, the 4th Air Force had 73 fighters, 20 dive bombers, 131 medium bombers and 12 bomber floatplanes available to support the invasion of Yugoslavia.

Composition of Italian 4th Air Force
Unit	Location	Aircraft
8th Independent Fighter Group	Oria	14 × Macchi C.200 fighters
153rd Independent Fighter Group	Brindisi	38 × Macchi C.200 fighters 9 × Fiat CR.42 biplane fighters
370th Independent Fighter Squadron	Grottaglie	12 × Macchi C.200 fighters
13th Bomber Wing	Gioia del Colle	24 × Fiat BR.20 medium bombers
35th Bomber/Naval Bomber Wing	Brindisi	15 × CANT Z.1007bis medium bombers 12 × CANT Z.1007bis bomber floatplanes
37th Bomber Wing	Lecce	20 × Fiat BR.20M medium bombers 7 × Fiat BR.20 medium bombers
38th Bomber Wing	Foggia	16 × Fiat BR.20 medium bombers
47th Bomber Wing	Grottaglie	26 × CANT Z.1007bis medium bombers
50th Bomber Group	Brindisi	8 × CANT Z.1007bis medium bombers
104th Bomber Group	Foggia	15 × Savoia-Marchetti SM.79 medium bombers
97th Dive Bomber Group	Lecce	20 × Junkers Ju 87B dive bombers

==== Air Command Albania ====
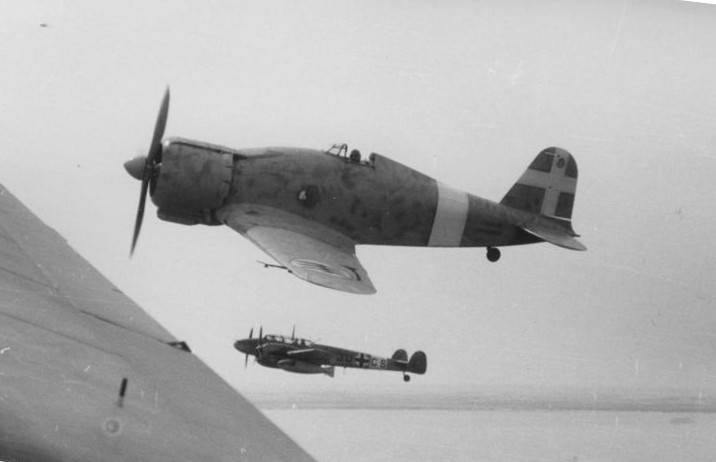
Fiat G.50 fighters were operated by two fighter groups of Air Command Albania

The headquarters of Air Command Albania (Italian: Comando Aeronautica Albania) was located at Tirana, Albania under the command of Generale di Squadra Aerea Ferruccio Ranza. It comprised five fighter groups, one dive bomber group equipped with German Junkers Ju 87B Stuka aircraft, three independent reconnaissance groups and two independent reconnaissance squadrons. In total, the Italians had 133 fighters, 20 dive bombers and 69 reconnaissance aircraft available in Albania to support the invasions of Yugoslavia and Greece.

Composition of Air Command Albania
Unit	Location	Aircraft
22nd Fighter Group	Tirana	37 × Macchi C.200 fighters
24th Fighter Group	Devoli	26 × Fiat G.50 fighters 1 × Caproni Ca.111 reconnaissance aircraft
150th Fighter Group	Valona	20 × Macchi C.200 fighters
154th Fighter Group	Devoli	20 × Fiat G.50 fighters
160th Fighter Group	Tirana	30 × Fiat CR.42 biplane fighters
101st Dive Bomber Group	Tirana	20 × Junkers Ju 87B dive bombers
5th Reconnaissance Group	Berat	18 × IMAM Ro.37bis reconnaissance biplanes
70th Reconnaissance Group	Tirana	17 × IMAM Ro.37bis reconnaissance biplanes
72nd Reconnaissance Group	Valona	9 × IMAM Ro.37bis reconnaissance biplanes 9 × Caproni Ca.311 reconnaissance aircraft
35th Reconnaissance Squadron	Pequini	8 × IMAM Ro.37bis reconnaissance biplanes
87th Reconnaissance Squadron	Tirana	7 × Caproni Ca.311 reconnaissance aircraft

=== Royal Italian Navy ===
Three destroyers of the Royal Italian Navy (Italian: Regia Marina) were deployed into the Adriatic in direct support of the invasion, and other units were tasked to suppress the Royal Yugoslav Navy.

== Hungarian ==
=== Royal Hungarian Army ===
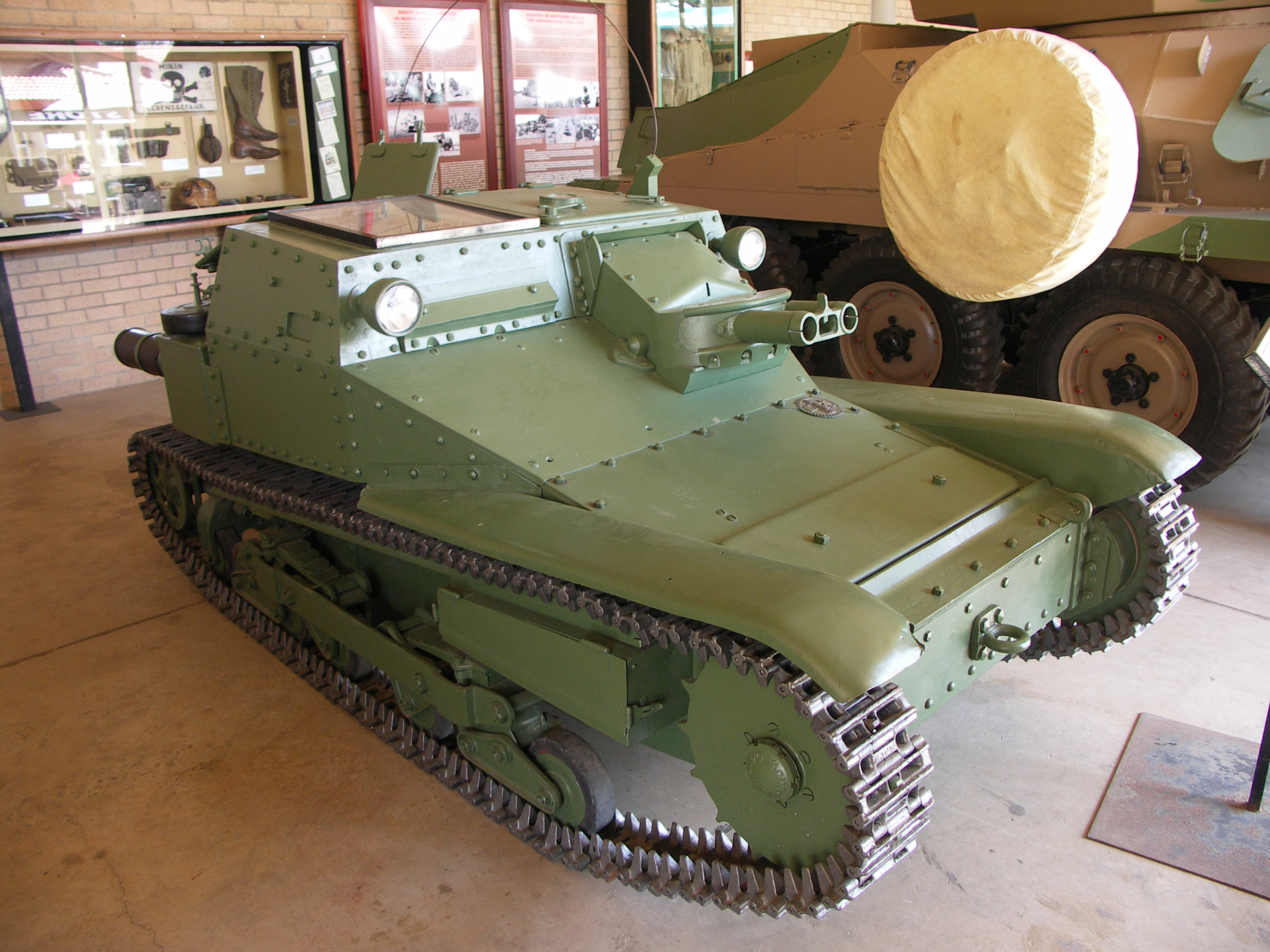
The Hungarian Mobile Corps was equipped with Italian-made L3/35 tankettes armed with machine guns

The Hungarian Army (Hungarian: Magyar Honvédség) committed the Mobile, I, IV and V Corps of Vezérezredes (Lieutenant General) Elemér Gorondy-Novák's 3rd Army to the invasion. The 1st Parachute Battalion was earmarked for airborne operations. The Hungarian invasion force was deployed along the Yugoslav border largely between the Danube and the Tisza.

Elements of the Hungarian 3rd Army
Formation-unit	Commander	Brigade-battalion
Mobile Corps	Altábornagy; Béla Miklós	1st Motorised Brigade
Mobile Corps	Altábornagy; Béla Miklós	2nd Motorised Brigade
Mobile Corps	Altábornagy; Béla Miklós	1st Cavalry Brigade
I Corps	Altábornagy; Zoltán Decleva	1st Infantry Brigade
I Corps	Altábornagy; Zoltán Decleva	13th Infantry Brigade
I Corps	Altábornagy; Zoltán Decleva	15th Infantry Brigade
IV Corps	Altábornagy; László Horváth	2nd Infantry Brigade
IV Corps	Altábornagy; László Horváth	10th Infantry Brigade
IV Corps	Altábornagy; László Horváth	12th Infantry Brigade
V Corps	Altábornagy; Antal Silley	14th Infantry Brigade
V Corps	Altábornagy; Antal Silley	19th Infantry Brigade
V Corps	Altábornagy; Antal Silley	2nd Cavalry Brigade
Independent Brigade	Vezérőrnagy; János Székely	9th Infantry Brigade
Independent Brigade	Vezérőrnagy; János Dömötör	11th Infantry Brigade
Independent Battalion	Alezredes; Árpád Bertalan	1st Parachute Battalion

=== Royal Hungarian Air Force ===
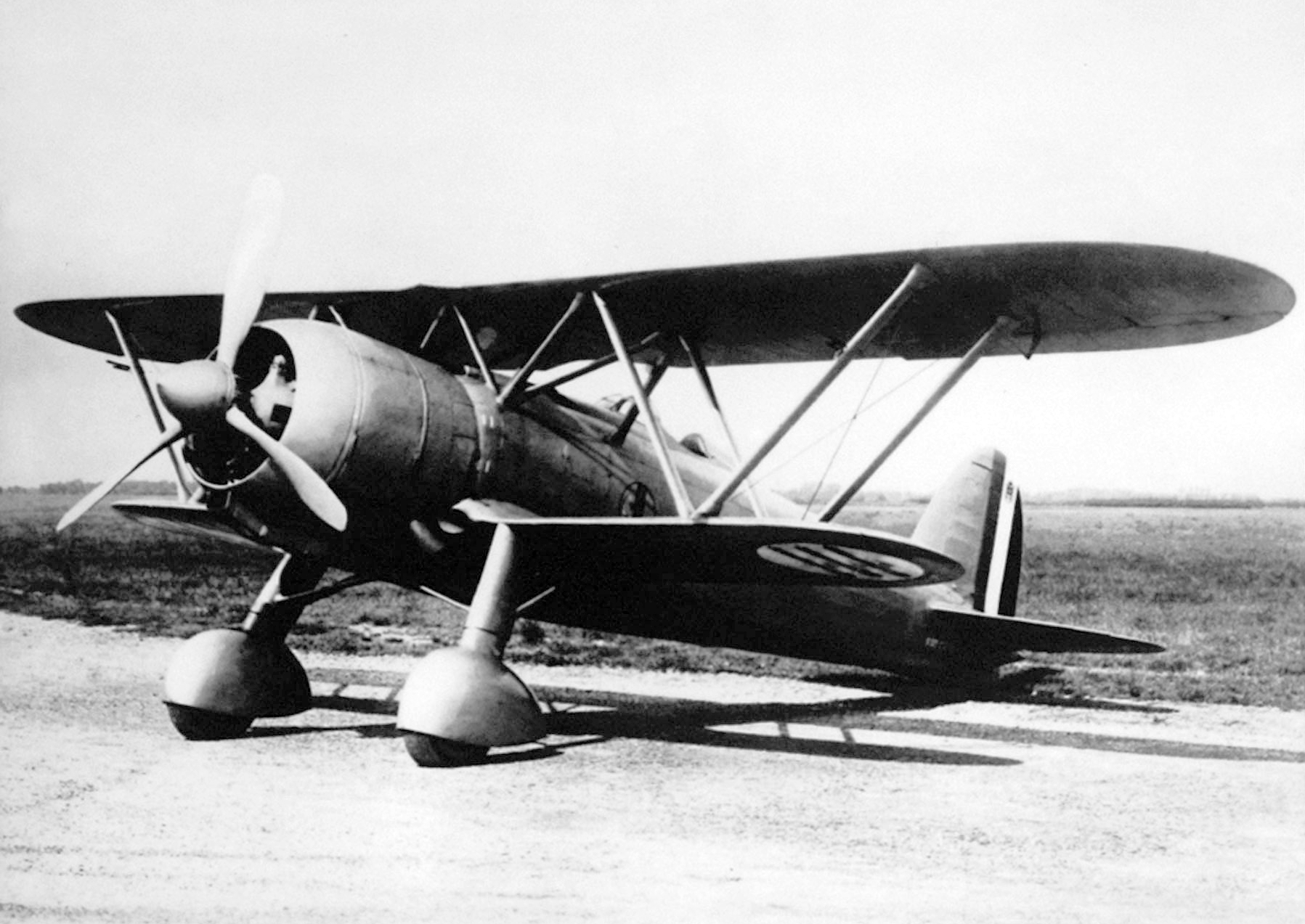
Fiat CR.42 biplane fighters were used by the MKHL during the invasion

The Royal Hungarian Air Force (Hungarian: Magyar Királyi Honvéd Légierő, MKHL) committed its 1st Air Brigade to the invasion, consisting of four fighter groups of the 1st and 2nd Air Regiments flying Fiat CR.42 biplane fighters, one reinforced bomber group from the 3rd and 4th Air Regiments with Junkers Ju 86 and Caproni Ca.135bis twin-engined bombers, and one reconnaissance group from the 5th Air Regiment operating Heinkel He 170A reconnaissance aircraft. Savoia-Marchetti SM.75 transports were used to transport the 1st Parachute Battalion.
