= Third Army (Hungary) =

- Hungarian: 3. magyar hadsereg
- Active: 1 March 1940 – 8 May 1945
- Country: Kingdom of Hungary
- Branch: Royal Hungarian Army
- Size: Field Army
- Engagements: World War II: Invasion of Yugoslavia; Battle of Debrecen; Battle of Budapest

The Hungarian Third Army (Hungarian: 3. magyar hadsereg) was a field army in the Royal Hungarian Army that saw action during World War II.

== Commanders ==
- Lieutenant General Elemér Gorondy-Novák from 1 March 1940 to 1 November 1941
- Lieutenant General Zoltán Decleva from 1 November 1941 to 1 December 1942
- Lieutenant General Lajos Csatay from 1 December 1942 to 12 June 1943
- Lieutenant General Károly Beregfy from 12 June 1943 to 15 May 1944
- The Hungarian Third Army was disbanded May 1944 and reformed September 1944
- Colonel General József Vitéz Heszlényi from 19 September 1944 to 8 May 1945

== Order of Battle - Yugoslavia - April 1941 ==
On 5 April 1941, the Hungarian Third Army was mobilized for the invasion of Yugoslavia. The invasion began with the bombing of Belgrade and the crossing of the border by the Germans on 6 April.

The Third Army faced the Yugoslavian First Army. By the time the Hungarians crossed the border and finally attacked, the Germans had been attacking Yugoslavia for over a week. As a result, the Yugoslavs put up little resistance to the Hungarians. Units of the Hungarian Third Army advanced into a triangular shaped area known as the Baranya-triangle between the Danube River and the Drava River. The Hungarians suffered few casualties in this invasion. As a result of participating in the invasion of Yugoslavia, Hungary regained Bácska and Baranya.

- Hungarian Third Army - Lieutenant General Elemér Gorondy-Novak
  - Hungarian Mobile Infantry Corps (Gyorshadtest)
    - Hungarian 1st Mobile Infantry Brigade
    - Hungarian 2nd Mobile Infantry Brigade
    - Hungarian 1st Cavalry Brigade
  - Hungarian I Infantry Corps
    - Hungarian 1st Infantry Brigade
    - Hungarian 13th Infantry Brigade
    - Hungarian 15th Infantry Brigade
  - Hungarian IV Infantry Corps
    - Hungarian 2nd Infantry Brigade
    - Hungarian 10th Infantry Brigade
    - Hungarian 12th Infantry Brigade
  - Hungarian V Infantry Corps
    - Hungarian 14th Infantry Brigade
    - Hungarian 19th Infantry Brigade
    - Hungarian 2nd Cavalry Brigade
  - Hungarian 9th Infantry Brigade
  - Hungarian 11th Infantry Brigade
  - Hungarian 1st Air Brigade
  - Hungarian 1st Airborne Battalion
  - Hungarian 16th Border Guards Infantry Battalion

== Order Of Battle - Soviet Union - October 1944 ==
From 25 March to 15 April 1944, the Hungarian VII Army Corps was involved in the Battle of Kamenets-Podolsky pocket. The Hungarian VII Army Corps was to become part of the Hungarian Third Army in August.

On 30 August, the Hungarian Third Army was mobilized to defend Hungary against the relentless advances of the Soviet 2nd and 4th Ukrainian Fronts. The Chief of Staff of the Hungarian Armed Forces, Colonel-General János Vörös, ordered this army of nine weak, undermanned, and under equipped reserve divisions to attack west of the Hungarian Second Army (which was mobilized at the same time). The Third Army was to then cross Arad and the Maros Valley and occupy the mountain passes of Transylvania. This attack failed.

On 6 October, in the opening stages of the Battle of Debrecen, the Hungarian Third Army was badly mauled near Arad. Very quickly, the army was scattered near the town of Kecskemét. Rodion Malinovsky's 2nd Ukrainian Front attempted a pincer maneuver to encircle Army Group Fretter-Pico. The 2nd Ukrainian Front's southern pincer sliced easily through the Hungarian Third Army. This southern pincer was spearheaded by Soviet General Issa Pliyev's Mobile Group Pliyev. Later, in the same battle, Mobile Group Pliyev was encircled and badly mauled by Army Group Fretter-Pico (Armeegruppe Fretter-Pico). The northern pincer was stalled and turned back by veteran German panzer forces. The Hungarian Second Army was an integral part of the German-Hungarian Armeegruppe Fretter-Pico.

The Order Of Battle in October 1944 was as follows:

- Hungarian Third Army - Lieutenant-General József Heszlényi (awarded German Knight's Cross of the Iron Cross on 28 October 1944)
  - Hungarian VIII Army Corps
    - Hungarian 1st Cavalry Division
    - Hungarian 20th Infantry Division
    - Hungarian 5th Replacement Division
    - Hungarian 8th Replacement Division
  - Hungarian VII Army Corps
    - Hungarian 10th Infantry Division
    - Hungarian 23rd Reserve Division
    - Hungarian Battle Group Szücs
  - German LVII Panzer Corps
    - German 23rd Panzer Division
    - German 24th Panzer Division
    - Hungarian 1st Armoured Division (Note: In October 1944, the Hungarian 1st Armored Division was part of the Hungarian Third Army as an attachment to the German LVII Panzer Corps. However, the division existed only on paper until April 1943. Until then, all of the 1st Armored Division's components were components to the Hungarian 1st Armored Field Division. Once formed, the Hungarian 1st Armored Division was used as a training and replacement unit. This lasted until mid-1944 when the division was ready for combat. It was at this time that it was attached to the German LVII Panzer Corps and participated in the Battle of Debrecen. Starting in December 1944 the division participated in the Battle of Budapest. By February 1945, the Hungarian 1st Armored Division was destroyed in this battle.)

The Hungarian Second Army was disbanded on 1 December 1944, after the Battle of Debrecen, and its remaining units were transferred to the Third Army.

== Fall of Budapest and the End ==
From 29 December 1944, the Hungarian capital city, Budapest was under siege. In the Battle of Budapest every available Hungarian unit was employed in the defense of the capital. After great loss, the city was unconditionally surrendered on 13 February 1945.

== Order of Battle - Hungary - March 1945 ==
For Operation Spring Awakening the Third Hungarian Army, under the command of the German Sixth Army, had the following order of battle:

- Hungarian VIII Army Corps
  - Hungarian 1st Hussar Division
  - Hungarian 23rd Infantry Division
  - German 6th Panzer Division
  - German 96th Infantry Division
  - German 711th Infantry Division

Between 16 March and 25 March 1945, most of what was left of the Hungarian Third Army was surrounded and destroyed about forty kilometers to the west of Budapest. The army was destroyed by the Soviet 46th Army as it advanced towards Vienna. But, even after this, the Hungarian Third Army did not totally cease to exist. Some remnants remained and they fought on. Fighting as they went, they moved progressively westward to southern Austria. The army was not officially disbanded until 8 May 1945, the end of the war, when the last commander of the Hungarian Third Army, Lieutenant General József Heszlényi, surrendered.

== See also ==
- Hungary in World War II
- Military of Hungary
- Invasion of Yugoslavia – 1941
- Battle of the Kamenets-Podolsky pocket – 1944
- Battle of Debrecen - 1944
- Siege of Budapest – 1944–45
- Eastern Front (World War II)
- First Army (Hungary)
- Second Army (Hungary)
- Gyorshadtest
- Szent László Infantry Division

== Notes ==
Footnotes

Citations
