= József Heszlényi =

Hungarian general

- Born: 24 July 1890; Igló, Szepes County, Kingdom of Hungary (now Spišská Nová Ves, Slovakia)
- Died: 2 June 1945 (aged 54); Zwettl, Allied-occupied Austria
- Burial place: German War Cemetery in Allentsteig, Lower Austria
- Military career
- Allegiance: Austria-Hungary (to 1918); Kingdom of Hungary
- Branch: Austro-Hungarian Army; Royal Hungarian Army
- Service years: 1911–1945
- Rank: Vezérezredes (Colonel General)
- Commands: IV Corps; Third Army
- Conflicts: World War I; World War II

József Vitéz Heszlényi (Heyszl; 24 July 1890 – 2 June 1945) was a Hungarian general during World War II and commander of the 3rd Hungarian Army.

He graduated from the Imperial and Royal Technical Military Academy in 1911.

On 8 May 1945, Heszlényi, along with his son, József Heszlényi Jr., who served on the staff of his father, were captured by American troops. Heszlényi was then handed over to the Soviets, where he committed suicide by cutting his wrists with a razor blade on 2 June 1945 in Zwettl, Austria. On 19 June 1945 a military tribunal posthumously demoted and dishonorably discharged Heszlényi from the Hungarian Army.

== Military career ==
- Commanding Officer 23rd Infantry Brigade, November 1938 - 1 March 1940
- Commanding Officer 2nd Motorized Brigade, 1 March 1940 - 1 November 1940
- Deputy Chief of Supply Bureau, Ministry of Defense, 1 November 1940 - 1 May 1941
- Chief of Supply Bureau, Ministry of Defense (HM/III), 1 May 1941 - 1 May 1942
- Chief of Main Supply Bureau, Ministry of Defense, 1 May 1942 - December 1942
- G.O.C. IV. Army Corps, December 1942 - September 1944
- Acting Commander-in-Chief, 3rd Army

== Awards ==
- Iron Cross (1939) 2nd and 1st Class
- Knight's Cross of the Iron Cross (28 October 1944)
- Order of Vitéz

Military offices
Preceded by Lieutenant-General Károly Beregfy	Commander of the Hungarian Third Army; September 19, 1944 – May 8, 1945	Succeeded by none
