= Mihály Ibrányi =

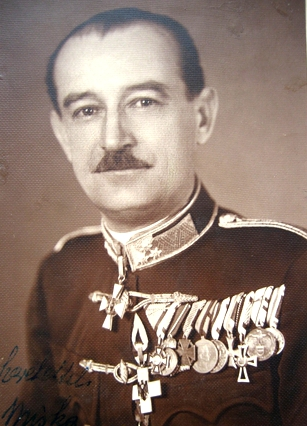
Ibrányi Mihály

Mihály Ibrányi (born 3 December 1895, Debrecen, Austro-Hungarian Empire – died 19 October 1962, Budapest, Hungary) was a Hungarian officer during World War II. He commanded the Hungarian First Cavalry Division and V Corps.

== Awards (Selected) ==
- Iron Cross - 2nd and 1st Class - 1939
- Knight's Cross of the Iron Cross - 26 November 1944
- Marian Cross (Teutonic Order)
