= Iván Hindy =

Hungarian general (1890–1946)

Vitéz Iván Hindy de Kishind
- Born: 28 June 1890; Budapest, Pest-Pilis-Solt-Kiskun, Kingdom of Hungary, Austria-Hungary
- Died: 29 August 1946 (aged 56); Budapest, Second Hungarian Republic
- Military career
- Allegiance: Hungary
- Branch: Royal Hungarian Army
- Service years: 1909–1945
- Rank: Vezérezredes
- Commands: I Corps
- Conflicts: World War I; World War II; Siege of Budapest
- Awards: Iron Cross First and Second Class; Knight's Cross with Oak Leaves

Iván vitéz Hindy de Kishind or vitéz kishindi Hindy Iván (28 June 1890, Budapest – 29 August 1946, Budapest) was an officer in the Royal Hungarian Army during World War II.

Colonel-General Hindy commanded the Hungarian I Corps from 16 October 1944 to 12 February 1945.

From 29 December 1944, Hindy also commanded the Hungarian defenders of Budapest during the Siege of Budapest. On 11 February 1945, Hindy was captured by the Soviets trying to escape just prior to the fall of the city on 13 February. The commander of the German defenders of Budapest, Waffen SS General Karl Pfeffer-Wildenbruch, orchestrated the breakout attempt and was also captured.

Hindy was sentenced to death after the war. In 1946, he was executed by hanging.

== Command history ==
- President, Military Courts and Court of Honor – 1940 to 1942
- General Officer Commanding, I Corps, Eastern Front and Budapest – 1944 to 1945
- Prisoner of war – 1945 to 1946
- Condemned to death and executed – 1946
