= Lajos Csatay =

Hungarian military officer and politician

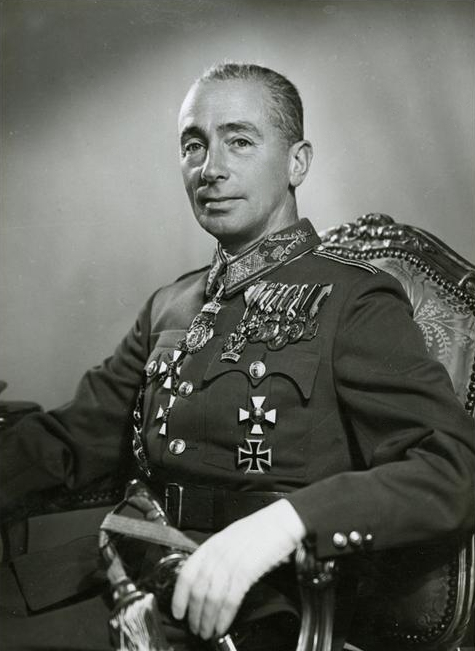
- Csatay in 1943
- Born: 1 August 1886; Arad, Kingdom of Hungary (now in Romania)
- Died: 16 October 1944 (aged 58); Budapest, Kingdom of Hungary
- Military career
- Allegiance: Austria-Hungary; Hungarian Soviet Republic; Kingdom of Hungary
- Rank: Colonel General
- Commands: 4th Home Defence Brigade, 5th Brigade, IV Corps; Hungarian Third Army
- Conflicts: World War I World War II

Vitéz Lajos Csatay de Csataj (born as Lajos Tutzentaller on 1 August 1886 – 16 October 1944) was a Hungarian military officer and politician, who served as Minister of Defence between June 1943 and October 1944.

== Life ==
=== World War I and the Interwar ===
He fought in World War I and then joined the Hungarian Red Army to fight against the rebelling Slovak, Romanian, and other nationalists. Between 1919 and 1921 he was a teacher of the Military Academy of Budapest. From 1926 he was a commander of a mixed brigade.

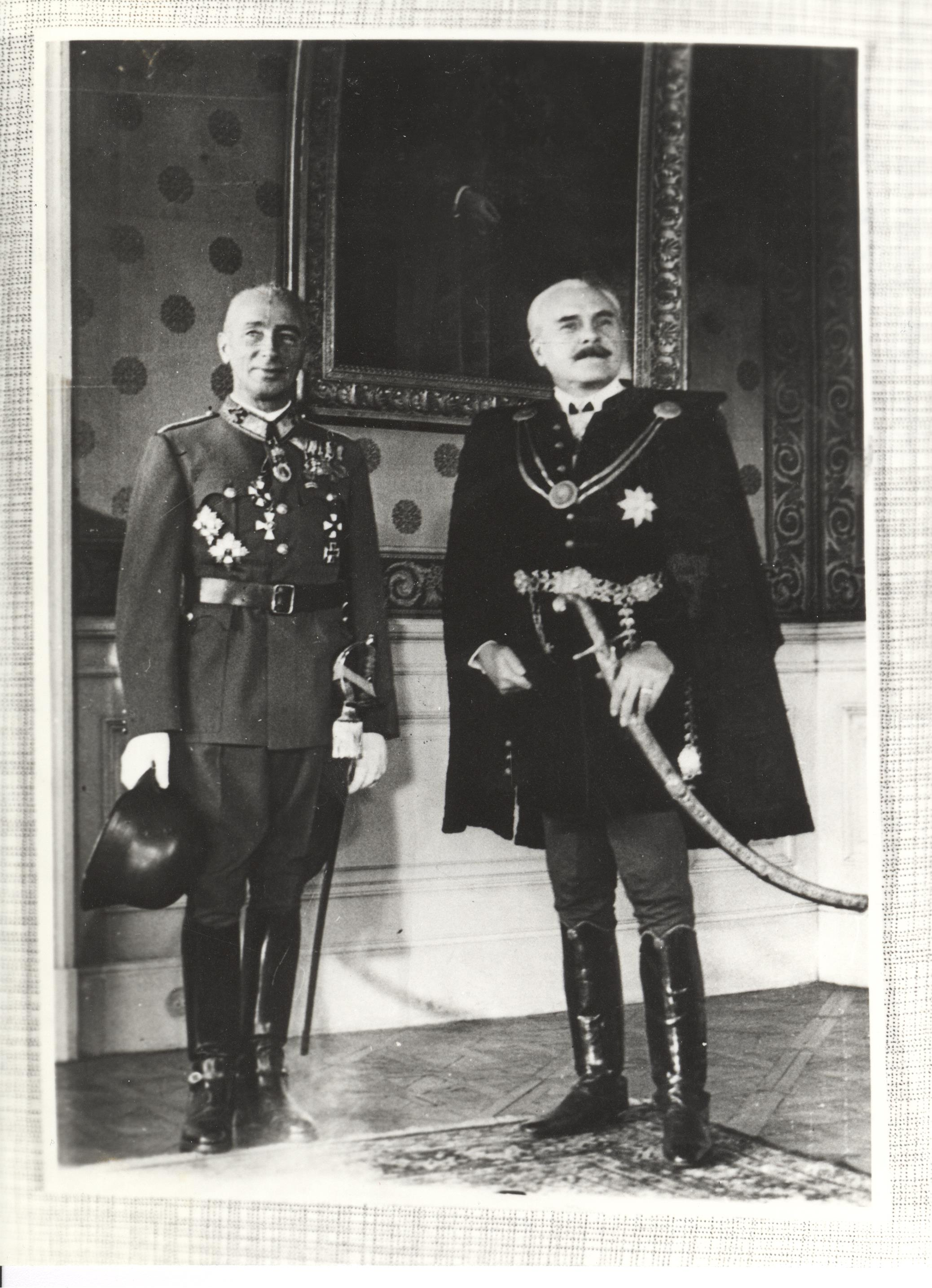
Kállay Miklós (1887–1967; Prime Minister) and Csatay Lajos (National Defense Minister), 13 June 1943

=== World War II ===
In the first year of World War II, he was Chief of Artillery Field Training, until 1 August 1941, when he became commander of the IV Army Corps. With this Corps, he served on the battlefield in the Soviet Union until 3 December 1942, when he was recalled to Hungary, to reform and lead the Hungarian Third Army.
Then Miklós Kállay appointed him as Minister of Defence in June 1943. Initially he supported the Nazis and the continuation of the war, but his opinion changed continuously. After the replacement of the Sztójay administration he kept his position. Géza Lakatos, the new prime minister's real aim was leaving the war.

==== Operation Panzerfaust ====
The cabinet wanted to initiate peace negotiations with the Allies. Miklós Horthy moved to reconsolidate his influence and began considering strategies for surrendering to the Western Allies because he distrusted the Red Army. The attempted coup was unsuccessful. Horthy was captured by Edmund Veesenmayer and his staff later on 15 October and taken to the Waffen SS office, where he was held overnight.

Lajos Csatay was arrested by the Gestapo; as a result he committed suicide along with his wife.

== Awards and decorations ==

1st row	Golden Military Merit Medal on war ribbon with swords	Order of Merit of the Kingdom of Hungary Commander's Cross with Star on war ribbon with swords	Order of Merit of the Kingdom of Hungary Commander's Cross with Star on war ribbon	Order of Merit of the Kingdom of Hungary Officer's Cross
2nd row	Order of the Iron Crown (Austria) 3rd Class with war decoration and swords	Military Merit Cross 3rd Class with war decoration and swords	Silver Military Merit Medal on war ribbon with swords	Bronze Military Merit Medal on war ribbon with swords
3rd row	Hungarian Bronze Military Merit Medal on war ribbon with swords	Hungarian Bronze Military Merit Medal	Karl Troop Cross	Hungarian World War I Commemorative Medal
4th row	Long Service Crosses for Officers 2nd class	Long Service Crosses for Officers 3rd class	1908 Military Jubilee Cross	Iron Cross 1st Class (1939–1945)
Badge	Badge of the Order of Vitéz			

Political offices
Preceded by Vilmos Nagy	Minister of Defence; 12 June 1943 – 16 October 1944	Succeeded by Károly Beregfy
Military offices
Preceded by Lieutenant-General Zoltán Decleva	Commander of the Hungarian Third Army; 1 December 1942 – 12 June 1943	Succeeded by Lieutenant-General Károly Beregfy
