= Gabriele Nasci =

Italian general

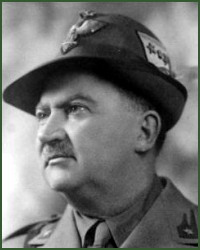
Gabriele Nasci

Gabriele Nasci (3 October 1887, Venice – 12 April 1947) was a general of the Alpine Corps in the Royal Italian Army.

== Biography ==
Gabriele Nasci fought in the First World War.
Between the two World Wars, he was commander of the 2nd Alpine Division "Tridentina" (1935–38), the 36th Infantry Division "Forlì" (1939) and 52nd Infantry Division "Torino", becoming in 1939 Senior Commander of the Alpine Troops. During the Second World War, he participated in the Greek campaign in command of the XXVI Army Corps operating in the Macedonian sector. In April 1941, he led the Librazhd Sector during the World War II Axis invasion of Yugoslavia., and afterwards became commander of the XVIII Army Corps, deployed in Dalmatia.
Between March 1942 and May 1943, he led the Alpine Army Corps, under the Italian Army in Russia of General Italo Gariboldi, operating on the Eastern Front and was engaged in heavy fighting. After his return to Italy and the following Armistice of Cassibile, he allied himself with the Yugoslavian partisans.

== Bibliography ==
- Nafziger, George (1997). "Italian 2nd & 9th Army – Invasion of Yugoslavia – 5 April 1941" (PDF). Combined Arms Research Library Digital Library. Archived from the original (PDF) on 22 March 2014.
