= Balkans campaign (World War II) =

Series of offensives in 1940 and 1941

- Part of Mediterranean and Middle East theatre of the Second World War
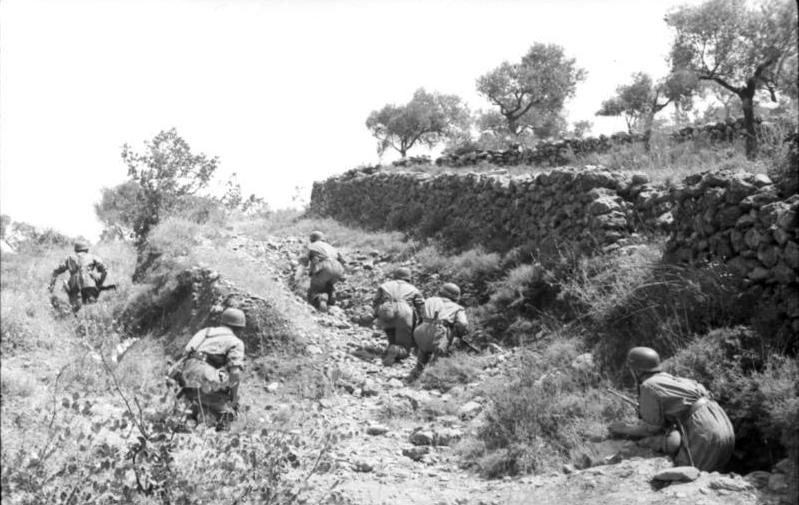
- German paratroopers on Crete in 1941
Date	28 October 1940 – 1 June 1941 (7 months and 4 days)
Location	Albania, Yugoslavia, Greek mainland and the Greek islands
Result	Axis victory: Guerrilla war in Yugoslavia; Guerrilla war in Greece
Territorial changes	Yugoslavia and Greece come under Axis control

Belligerents
Axis: Italy: Albania; Germany (from April 1941); Hungary (from April 1941)	Allies: Greece; Yugoslavia (from April 1941); United Kingdom; Australia; New Zealand

Commanders and leaders
(Kingdom of Italy) Pietro Badoglio (Kingdom of Italy) Ugo Cavallero (Kingdom of Italy) Vittorio Ambrosio (Nazi Germany) Walther von Brauchitsch (Nazi Germany) Wilhelm List (Nazi Germany) Kurt Student (Kingdom of Hungary (1920–1946)) Elemér Gorondy-Novák	(Kingdom of Greece) Ioannis Metaxas (Kingdom of Greece) Alexandros Papagos (Kingdom of Yugoslavia) Dušan Simović (Kingdom of Yugoslavia) Milorad Petrović (United Kingdom) Henry Wilson (Dominion of New Zealand) Bernard Freyberg (Australia) Thomas Blamey

Strength
(Kingdom of Italy) 565,000 (Nazi Germany) 680,000 (Kingdom of Hungary (1920–1946)) 80,000; Total: 1,325,000	(Kingdom of Greece) 430,000 (Kingdom of Yugoslavia) 850,000 (United Kingdom) 62,612; Total: 1,342,612

The Balkans campaign of World War II began with the Italian invasion of Greece on 28 October 1940. In the early months of 1941, Italy's offensive had stalled and a Greek counter-offensive pushed into Albania. Germany sought to aid Italy by deploying troops to Romania and Bulgaria and attacking Greece from the east. Meanwhile, the British landed troops and aircraft to shore up Greek defences. A coup d'état in Yugoslavia on 27 March caused Adolf Hitler to order the conquest of that country.

The invasion of Yugoslavia by Germany and Italy began on 6 April 1941, simultaneously with the renewed invasion of Greece; on 11 April, Hungary joined the invasion of Yugoslavia. By 17 April the Yugoslavs had signed an armistice, and by 30 April all of mainland Greece was under German or Italian control. On 20 May Germany invaded Crete by air, and by 1 June all remaining Greek and British forces on the island had surrendered. Although it had not participated in the attacks in April, Bulgaria occupied parts of both Yugoslavia and Greece shortly thereafter for the remainder of the war in the Balkans.

== Background ==
After World War I, with the complete collapse of the Ottoman Empire and the Austro-Hungarian Empire, the Albanians looked to the Kingdom of Italy for protection against its traditional enemies. In 1919, Albania's territorial integrity was confirmed at the Paris Peace Conference after United States President Woodrow Wilson opposed a plan by the European powers to divide Albania amongst its neighbors. However, after 1925, Italian dictator Benito Mussolini sought to dominate Albania. In 1928, Albania became a kingdom under Zog I, who was a clan chief and former Prime Minister. Zog failed to stave off Italian ascendancy in Albanian internal affairs. On 7 April 1939, Italian troops invaded Albania, overthrew Zog, and annexed the country to the Italian Empire.

== Campaign ==
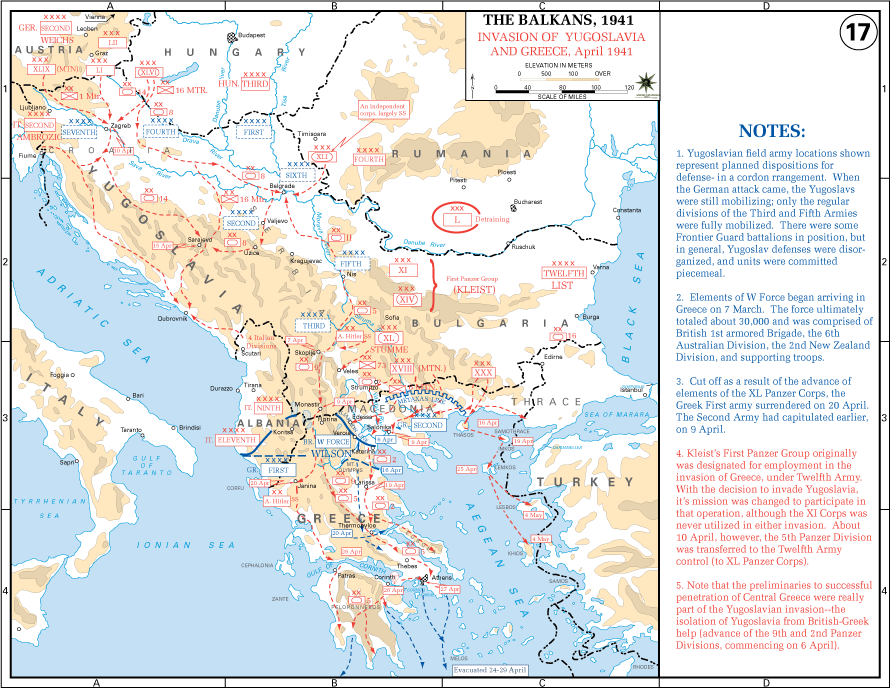
Axis advances in the Balkans in April 1941.

=== Greco-Italian War ===
The Italian invasion of Greece lasted from 28 October 1940 to 30 April 1941. Italian forces invaded Greece and made limited gains. But soon the Greeks counter-attacked and the Italians were driven back to the Albanian border. In this period the United Kingdom was supporting the Greeks with the Royal Air Force, but the arrival of British and Commonwealth ground troops in Greece was delayed due to operations in North Africa. The Italians spent much of the winter stabilizing a line which left them in control of only about two-thirds of Albania. A much anticipated Italian offensive in March 1941 resulted in few territorial gains. Germany, led by Adolf Hitler, intervened in April and invaded Greece after the successful invasion of Yugoslavia. Meanwhile the Italian 9th and 11th armies began to pursue the retreating Greek units back to the mainland. Although the Greek units fought the Italians as rearguards and delayed their advance as much as possible, on 23 April Greece officially surrendered both to Italy and Germany.

=== Invasion of Yugoslavia ===
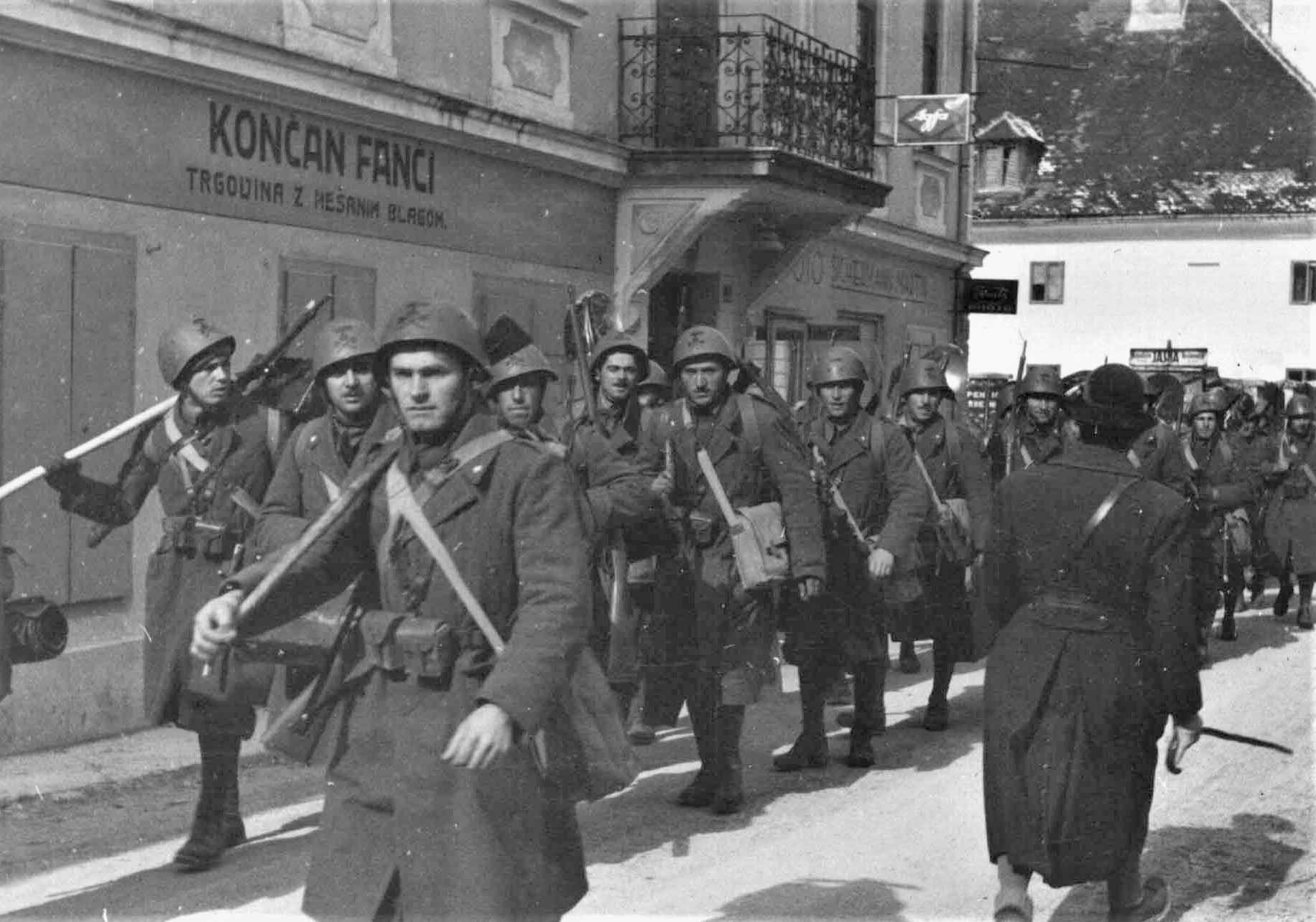
Italian soldiers entering Yugoslavia

The invasion of Yugoslavia (also known as "Operation 25") began on 6 April 1941 and ended with the unconditional surrender of the Royal Yugoslav Army on 17 April. The invading Axis powers (Nazi Germany, Fascist Italy, and Hungary) occupied and dismembered the Kingdom of Yugoslavia. By cobbling together Bosnia and Herzegovina, some parts of Croatia, and Syrmia, the "Independent State of Croatia" (Nezavisna Država Hrvatska, NDH) was created by Germany and Italy. In some of the territory of the former Kingdom of Serbia and the Banat, the German-occupied Territory of the Military Commander in Serbia, the Germans appointed a puppet government, the Government of National Salvation led by Milan Nedić. Montenegro remained under Italian occupation, and Bulgaria was permitted to annex eastern areas of Yugoslavia, including most of modern-day North Macedonia.

=== Battle of Greece ===
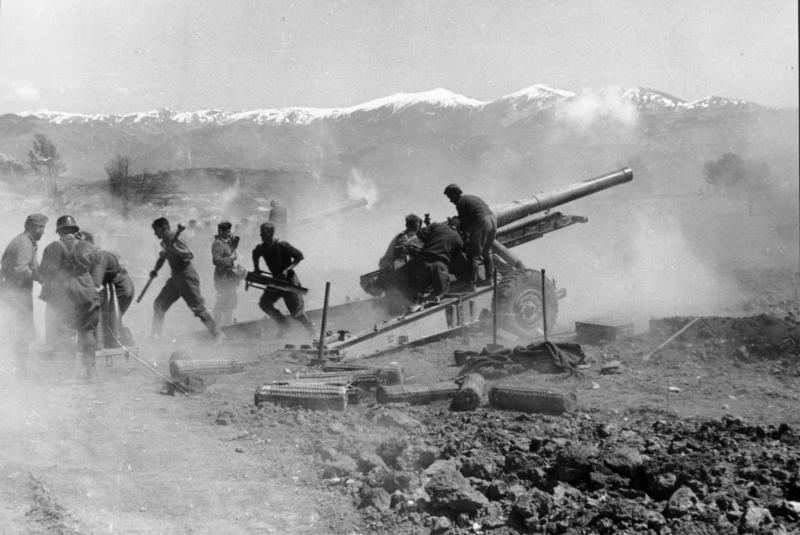
German artillery firing during the advance through Greece

Hitler began planning to invade Greece in November 1940, after the British occupied Crete and Lemnos. He ordered the invasion of Greece — code-named Unternehmen Marita (Operation Marita) — on 13 December 1940 for execution in March 1941. The stated aim of the operation was to prevent the British from getting air bases within striking range of the Romanian oilfields. On 6 April 1941, the German Army invaded northern Greece, while other elements launched an attack against Yugoslavia. Breaking through the Yugoslav lines in southern Yugoslavia allowed Germany to send reinforcements to the battlefields of northern Greece. The German army out-flanked the Greek Metaxas Line fortifications and, despite the assistance provided by a British expeditionary corps, set out to capture the southern Greek cities. The Battle of Greece ended with the German entry into Athens and the capture of the Peloponnese, although about 40,000 Allied soldiers were evacuated to Crete, prompting one of the largest airborne attacks in the history of warfare: Operation Merkur, or the Battle of Crete.

=== Battle of Crete ===
On 20 May 1941, German paratroopers were dropped over the airfields of northern Crete to occupy the island. They were met by heavy resistance from Allied forces and the local Cretan population but eventually the defenders were overwhelmed by the German forces. The British Government ordered an evacuation on 27 May and the remaining forces surrendered on 1 June. However, the heavy losses incurred by the paratroopers convinced the Supreme Command of the Wehrmacht to abandon large-scale airborne operations for the remainder of the war.

== Result ==
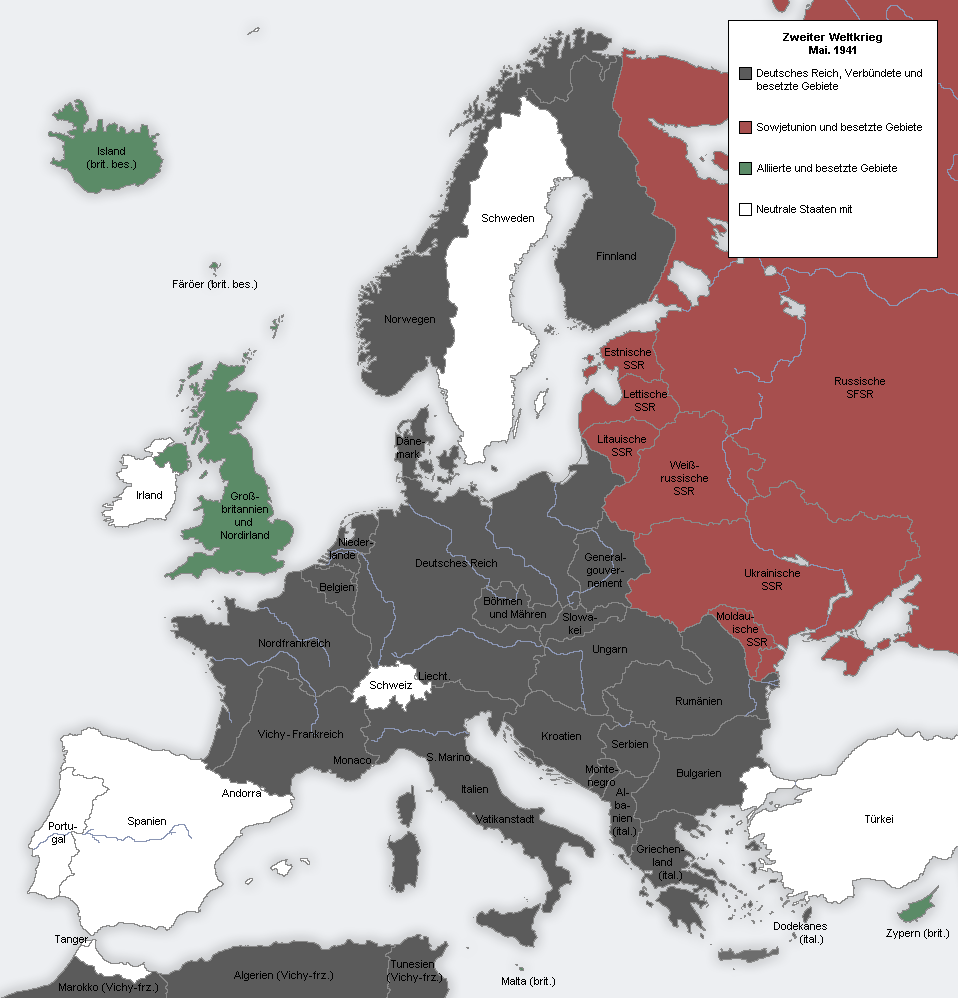
Situation in Europe by May/June 1941 at the conclusion of the Balkans campaign, immediately before Operation Barbarossa

By 1 June 1941, all of Albania, Yugoslavia and Greece were under Axis control. Greece was placed under triple occupation, and Yugoslavia was dissolved and occupied. Germany had gained a significant strategic advantage: direct access to the Mediterranean.

=== Bulgarian occupation ===
On 6 April 1941, despite having officially joined the Axis Powers, the Bulgarian government did not participate in the invasion of Yugoslavia and the Battle of Greece. On 20 April, the Bulgarian Army occupied most of Western Thrace and the Greek province of Eastern Macedonia, which had been already conquered by Germany, with the goal of restoring its pre-World War I outlet to the Aegean Sea. Bulgarian troops also occupied much of eastern Serbia, where Vardar Banovina was divided between Bulgaria and the Italians.

=== Resistance movements ===
Throughout the remainder of the war, active Yugoslav, Greek, and Albanian resistance movements forced Germany and its allies to garrison hundreds of thousands of soldiers permanently in the three countries, denying them to the other fronts. Especially in Yugoslavia after 1943, the threat of an Allied invasion and the activities of the partisans necessitated large-scale counter-insurgency operations, involving several divisions.

== See also ==
- Adriatic campaign of World War II
