= Elemér Gorondy-Novák =

Hungarian military officer

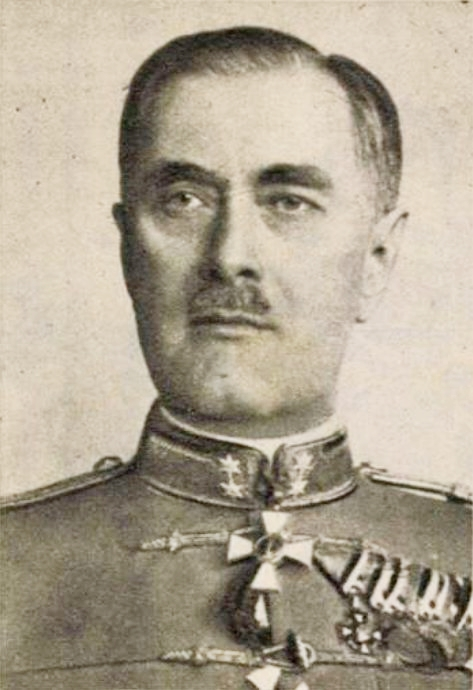
- Gorondy-Novák in 1940
- Born: 23 February 1885; Budapest, Austria-Hungary
- Died: 14 May 1954 (aged 69); Cosquin, Argentina
- Military career
- Allegiance: Austria-Hungary; Hungarian Soviet Republic; Kingdom of Hungary
- Rank: Lieutenant-General
- Commands: Hungarian Third Army
- Conflicts: World War I; Hungarian-Romanian War; World War II; Balkan Campaign

Elemér Gorondy-Novák (Novák; 23 February 1885 – 14 May 1954) was a Hungarian military officer, who served as commander of the Hungarian Third Army during the Second World War.

== Career ==
After the First World War he served as chief of staff of the First Division in the Hungarian Red Army. Later he joined to Miklós Horthy's counter-revolutionary National Army. He was promoted to general on 1 November 1934. Between 1 February 1935 and 1 October 1937 he served as commander of the 2nd Cavalry Brigade. On 1 May 1938 he became lieutenant general and an observer of the acceleration forces, and since 31 December 1938, of the cavalry.

He was appointed commander of the Third Army on 1 March 1940. He commanded the army during the occupation of Vojvodina. He was promoted to cavalry general on 1 May 1941. He was deposed from the army commander position on 1 November 1941. He was retired on 1 February 1942. From 22 October 1942 he served as royal councillor. After the Second World War, Gorondy-Novák moved abroad, to Argentina, where he died in 1954

== Trivia ==
Gorondy-Novák was called Goromba-Novák ("Rude-Novák") by his soldiers because of his strictness and rough style.

Military offices
Preceded by first	Commander of the Hungarian Third Army; 1 March 1940 – 1 November 1941	Succeeded by Lieutenant-General Zoltán Decleva
