= 14th Infantry Brigade (Hungary) =

- Hungarian: 14. gyalogdosztály
- Active: 1939–43
- Disbanded: August 1943
- Country: Kingdom of Hungary
- Branch: Royal Hungarian Army
- Type: Infantry
- Part of: V Corps

The 14th Infantry Brigade was a formation of the Royal Hungarian Army that participated in the Axis invasion of Yugoslavia during World War II.

== Organization ==
April 1941

14th Infantry Brigade (Szeged):

- 9. Infantry Regiment (Szeged): Colonel Laszlo Deak

I. Battalion (Szeged); II. Battalion (Csongrád); III. Battalion (Hódmezővásárhely)

- 14. Field Artillery Division (Szeged): Colonel Frederick Miklay

The 14. Infantry Brigade redesignated 14. Light Division 17 February 1942.

== Commanders ==
14th Infantry Brigade (Hungarian: 14. gyalogdosztály)

- Brigadier General Antal Silley (23 Jan 1939 - 1 Aug 1939)
- Brigadier General Marcell Stomm (1 Aug 1939 - 17 Feb 1942)

14th Light Division (Hungarian: 14. könnyűhadosztály)

- Brigadier General Marcell Stomm (17 Feb 1942 - ? Oct 1942)
- Brigadier General Zontán Kozma (? Oct 1942 - 10 Aug 1943)
