= Zoltán Decleva =

Hungarian military officer

- Born: 30 July 1887; Alsószemeréd, Kingdom of Hungary, Austria-Hungary (now Dolné Semerovce, Slovakia)
- Died: 17 July 1950 (aged 62); Budapest, People's Republic of Hungary
- Spouse: Elisabeth Henriette of Austria
- Military career
- Allegiance: Hungary
- Rank: Lieutenant-General
- Commands: Hungarian Third Army
- Conflicts: World War I World War II

Zoltán Decleva (30 July 1887 – 17 July 1950) was a Hungarian colonel-general, commander of the Third Army and privy councilor of Hungary. He was posthumously awarded the Order of Vitéz.

He commanded the Hungarian I Corps during the Invasion of Yugoslavia. In 1941, he was deputy chief of General Staff (May–October) and deputy commander in chief of the Army (November). Between 1 November 1941 and 3 December 1942, he commanded the 3rd Army, which occupied a part of Yugoslavia.

He retired on 1 February 1943.

== Biography ==
Zoltán was born on 30 July 1887 in Alsószemeréd (now Dolné Semerovce) in province of Lower Austria, Austria-Hungary (now Slovakia).

After graduating from the Military Academy in Pécs, he was commissioned as a second lieutenant in 1906 at the 19th Military Academy of Pécs, serving in an infantry regiment. He served a total of 42 months on the front lines during the First World War.

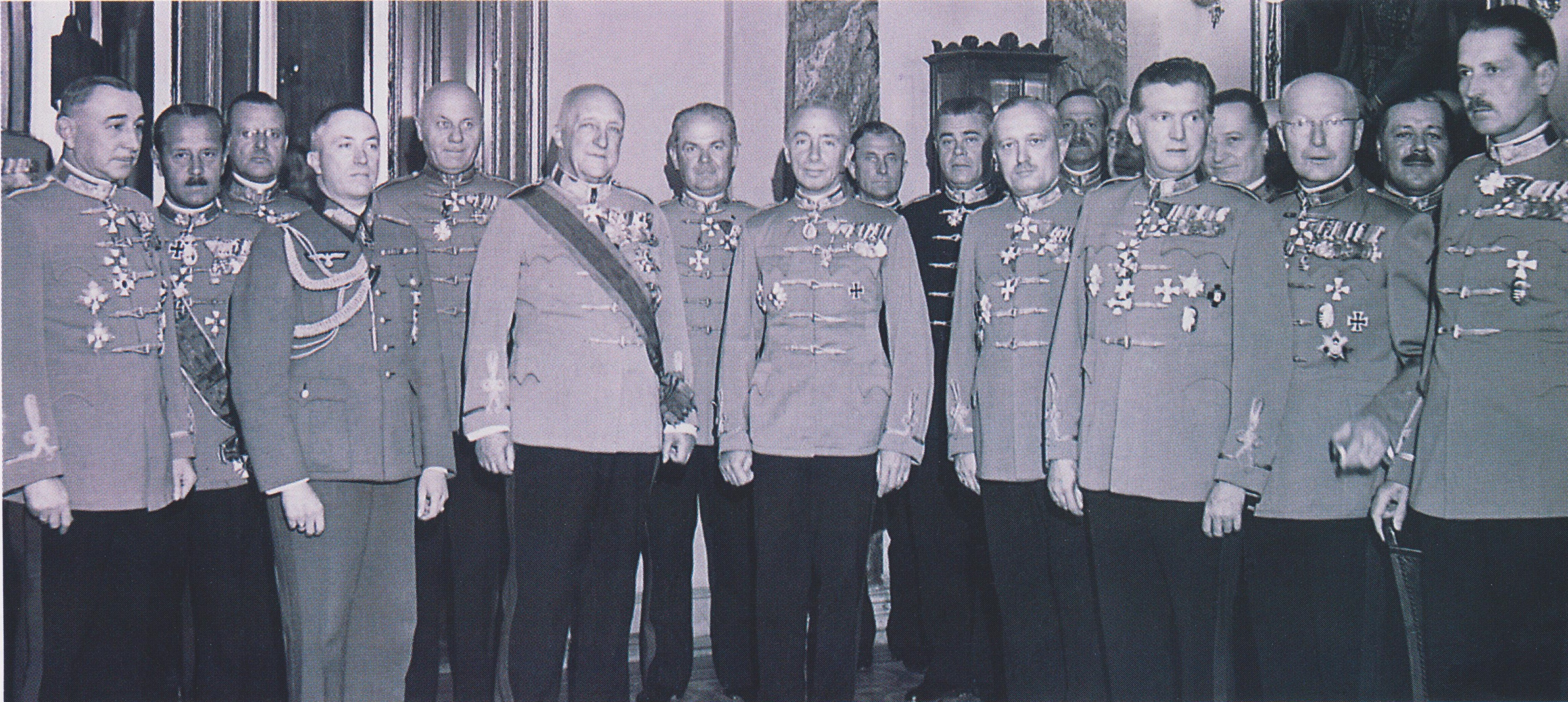
General Staff of the Royal Hungarian Army in 1944, including the Regent of Hungary Archduke Joseph August of Austria, István Schweitzer, Lajos Csatay, János Vörös, and Zoltán Decleva (first to the right)

He completed his studies at the Military Academy in Budapest (Hadiakadémia) in 1923. From 15 November 1927 until 1 May 1931, he served as aide-de-camp to the Supreme Commander of the Armed Forces (Honvédség). Subsequently, until 1 August 1933, he held the position of Chief of Staff of the 1st Mixed Brigade. Thereafter, he assumed leadership of the Training Department within the Ministry of Defence. As of 1 November 1936, he was appointed Deputy Chief of the General Staff of the Hungarian Army (Honvéd Vezérkar). On 1 May 1938, he was promoted to the rank of general. That same year, following the reorganization of the armed forces, he was designated as Second Deputy Chief of the General Staff, concurrently serving, from 1 October onward, as Secretary-General of the Supreme National Defence Council. On 1 March 1940, he assumed command of the 1st Army Corps. He was promoted to the rank of lieutenant general (altábornagy) on 1 September 1940. As commander of the 1st Army Corps, he took part in the "liberation" of Transylvania (Erdély) and the campaign in Bácska.

Zoltán Decleva died on 17 July 1950 in Budapest. He was graced posthumously with an Order of Vitéz in 2004.

Zoltán's son, Ferenc Decleva (1942–2016), became Capitan of Baranya County, colonel of the Hungarian National Guard and a member of Knights of Saint George.

== Promotions ==
- 1 May 1938: Major-General
- 1 September 1940: Lieutenant-General
- 1 October 1942: Colonel-General

== Service ==
- 1927-1931: Aide-de-Camp to the Commander in Chief of the Army
- 1930-1935: Adjutant of the Army Supreme Command
- 1931-1933: Chief of Staff 1st Mixed Brigade
- 1 March 1933 – 1 November 1936: Head Bureau of Training, Ministry of Defence
- 1 November 1936 – 1 October 1938: Deputy Chief General Staff
- 1 October 1938 – 1 March 1940: Secretary-General of the Supreme Military Council
- 1 March 1940 – 1 May 1941: General Officer Commanding I Corps [Yugoslavia]
- 1 May 1941 – 1 November 1941: Deputy Chief General Staff
- 1 May 1941 – 1 November 1941: Deputy Commander in Chief of the Army
- 1 November 1941 – 3 December 1942: General Officer Commanding 3rd Army [Yugoslavia]
- 1 February 1943: Retired

Military offices
Preceded by Major General Gusztáv Jány	Commander of the Hungarian I Corps; 1 March 1940 – 1 May 1941	Succeeded by Major General Imre Ruszkiczay-Rüdiger
Preceded by Lieutenant-General Elemér Gorondy-Novák	Commander of the Hungarian Third Army; 1 November 1941 – 1 December 1942	Succeeded by Lieutenant-General Lajos Csatay
