= 15th Infantry Brigade (Hungary) =

- Hungarian: 15. gyalogdosztály
- Active: 1939–43
- Disbanded: August 1943
- Country: Kingdom of Hungary
- Branch: Royal Hungarian Army
- Type: Infantry
- Part of: V Corps

The 15th Infantry Brigade was a formation of the Royal Hungarian Army that participated in the Axis invasion of Yugoslavia during World War II.

The 15th Infantry Brigade was redesignated 15th Light Division 17 February 1942.

== Organization ==
April 1941

15th Infantry Brigade (Kiskunhalas):

- 20. Infantry Regiment (Kiskunhalas): Brigadier General Alajos Lemberkovits

I. Battalion (Kiskunhalas); II. Battalion (Kalocsa); III. Battalion (Baja)

- 15. Field Artillery Division (Kiskunhalas): Lieutenant Colonel Tamas Szirmay

== Commanders ==
15th Infantry Brigade (Hungarian: 15. gyalogdosztály)

- Brigadier General Lajos Veress (23 Jan 1939 - 1 Mar 1940)
- Brigadier General Alajos Lemberkovits (1 Mar 1940 - 1 Aug 1941)
- Colonel József Grassy (1 Aug 1941 - 17 Feb 1942)

15th Light Division (Hungarian: 15. könnyűhadosztály)

- Colonel József Grassy (17 Feb 1942 - 1 Apr 1942)
- Major General Pál Platthy (1 Apr 1942 - 1 Aug 1943)
- Brigadier General József Vasváry (1 Aug 1943 - 10 Aug 1943)
