= IV Corps (Hungary) =

- Hungarian: IV. pécsi hadtest
- Active: 1 October 1938 – 19 September 1944
- Country: Kingdom of Hungary
- Branch: Royal Hungarian Army
- Type: Infantry
- Size: Corps
- Part of: Third Hungarian Army (1940-1942); Second Hungarian Army (1942-1944)
- Garrison/HQ: Pécs
- Engagements: World War II: Invasion of Yugoslavia; Case Blue; Ostrogozhsk–Rossosh offensive

Commanders
- Notable commanders: Mj. Gen. Lajos Csatay; Mj. Gen. Jozsef Heszlenyi

The IV Corps was a corps-level formation of the Royal Hungarian Army which saw extensive action on the Eastern Front during World War II.

== Formation ==
The Corps was created on 1 October 1938 from mixed brigades, as a direct result of the then Prime Minister Kálmán Darányi announcing rearmament (Győri Programme) on 5 March 1938.

== History ==
It partook in the Axis Invasion of Yugoslavia, that began on 6 April 1941, as part of the Hungarian Third Army.

In April 1942, the IV Corps became part of the Second Hungarian Army and was sent to the Eastern Front where it arrived in July 1942. It participated in Case Blue and advanced towards the Don River where it dug in for the coming winter around the area of Korotoyak, Voronezh Oblast . Together with the rest of the Second Hungarian Army, the Corps was largely destroyed during the Soviet Ostrogozhsk–Rossosh offensive in January 1943.

After its destruction on the Eastern Front, the IV Corps Headquarters was returned to Hungary. On 19 September 1944, the staff personnel of the Corps Headquarters was used to form a new Third Army, of which József Heszlényi also became commander.

== Commanding officer ==
| No. | Portrait | Commander | Took office | Left office | Time in office |
|---|---|---|---|---|---|
| 1 | Jenö Ruszkay | Major General; Jenö Ruszkay (1887–1946) | 1 February 1938 | 1 February 1940 | 2 years, 0 days |
| 2 | László Horváth | Major General; László Horváth (1888–1964) | 1 February 1940 | 1 August 1941 | 1 year, 181 days |
| 3 | Lajos Csatay | Major General; Lajos Csatay (1886–1944) | 1 August 1941 | 3 December 1942 | 1 year, 122 days |
| 4 | József Heszlényi | Major General; József Heszlényi (1890–1945) | 3 December 1942 | 10 September 1944 | 1 year, 282 days |

== Organisation ==
On 1 March 1940, the IV Corps (Pécs), had the 10th, 11th and 12th Infantry Brigades.
