= 11th Infantry Brigade (Hungary) =

- Hungarian: 11. könnyű hadosztály
- Active: 1940–43
- Disbanded: 10 August 1943
- Country: Kingdom of Hungary
- Branch: Royal Hungarian Army
- Type: Infantry
- Size: Brigade
- Part of: IV Corps

The 11th Infantry Brigade was a formation of the Royal Hungarian Army that participated in the Axis invasion of Yugoslavia during World War II.

== Invasion of Yugoslavia ==
The 11th Infantry Brigade, in particular, attacked Baranya and occupied it by 11 April, while the rest of the Third Army occupied Bacska by 14 April.

== Organisation ==
11th Infantry Brigade 1 March 1940 to 16 February 1942	11th Light Division 17 February 1942 to 10 August 1943 (Note: disbanded on 10 August 1943)
8th Infantry Regiment 38th Infantry Regiment
11th Artillery Regiment

== Commanders ==
11th Infantry Brigade (Hungarian: 11. gyalogdosztály)

- Brigadier General Kálmán Péchy (23 Jan 1939 - 1 Feb 1939)
- Brigadier General János Dömötor (1 Feb 1939 - 1 Feb 1942)
- Brigadier General Zoltán Álgya-Pap (1 Feb 1942 - 17 Feb 1942)

11th Light Division (Hungarian: 11. könnyűhadosztály)

- Brigadier General Zoltán Álgya-Pap (17 Feb 1942 - 15 Oct 1942)
- Brigadier General György Sziklay (15 Oct 1942 - 1 Nov 1942)
- Brigadier General Kálmán Csiby (15 Nov 1942 - 1 June 1943)
- Brigadier General Dr. Béla Temesy (1 June 1943 - 10 Aug 1943)
