= 19th Infantry Brigade (Hungary) =

- Hungarian: 19. gyalogdosztály
- Active: 1939–44
- Disbanded: August 1944
- Country: Kingdom of Hungary
- Branch: Royal Hungarian Army
- Type: Infantry
- Part of: VII Corps

The 19th Infantry Brigade was a formation of the Royal Hungarian Army that participated in the Axis invasion of Yugoslavia during World War II.

It was formed in Miskolc on January 23, 1939.

The 19th Infantry Brigade was redesignated 19th Light Division on 17 February 1942.

== Commanders ==
19th Infantry Brigade (Hungarian: 19. gyalogdosztály)

- Brigadier General József Csatary (23 Jan 1939 - 1 Aug 1941)
- Brigadier General Gyözö Beleznay (1 Aug 1941 - 17 Feb 1942)

19th Light Division (Hungarian: 19. könnyűhadosztály)

- Brigadier General Gyözö Beleznay (17 Feb 1942 - 1 May 1942)
- Colonel László Deák (1 May 1942 - ? Aug 1942)
- Colonel Ferenc Szász (? Aug 1942 - ? Sep 1942)
- Brigadier General Aladár Asztalossy (1 Oct 1942 - 1 June 1943)
