= 9th Infantry Brigade (Hungary) =

- Active: 1939 - 1942
- Country: Kingdom of Hungary (1920–1946)
- Branch: Royal Hungarian Army
- Type: Infantry

The 9th Infantry Brigade was a formation of the Royal Hungarian Army that participated in the Axis invasion of Yugoslavia during World War II.

== Commanders ==
- Brigadier General Jánas Székely (23 Jan 1939 - 1 Aug 1941)
- Brigadier General Imre Széchy (1 Aug 1941 - 17 Feb 1942)
