= 2nd Cavalry Brigade (Hungary) =

The 2nd Cavalry Brigade was a formation of the Royal Hungarian Army that participated in the Axis invasion of Yugoslavia during World War II.

== Organization ==
Structure of the brigade:

- Headquarters - under Brigadier General Antal Vattay
- 4th Armoured Reconnaissance Battalion
- 1st Cavalry Regiment
- 2nd Cavalry Regiment
- 15th Bicycle Battalion
- 16th Bicycle Battalion
- 4th Motorized Artillery Battalion
- 4th Horse Artillery Battalion
- 2nd Cavalry Artillery Battalion
- 2nd Cavalry Anti-Aircraft Battery
- 2nd Cavalry Engineer Company
- 2nd Cavalry Bridging Engineer Company
- 2nd Cavalry Signal Company
- 2nd Cavalry Traffic Control Signal Company
- 2nd Cavalry Brigade Service Regiment
