= 12th Infantry Brigade (Hungary) =

- Hungarian: 12. könnyű hadosztály
- Active: 1940–45
- Disbanded: 12 February 1945
- Country: Kingdom of Hungary
- Branch: Royal Hungarian Army
- Type: Infantry
- Part of: IV Corps

The 12th Infantry Brigade was a formation of the Royal Hungarian Army that participated in the Axis invasion of Yugoslavia during World War II.

== Organisation ==
12th Infantry Brigade 1 March 1940 to 16 February 1942	12th Light Division 17 February 1942 to 10 August 1943 (Note: The 12th Light Division became the 12th Reserve Division on 10 August 1943.)	12th Reserve Division 10 August 1943 to 23 October 1944 (Note: On 23 October 1944, it became the 12th Infantry Division.)	12th Infantry Division 10 August 1943 to 12 February 1945 (Note: disbanded on 12 February 1945)
18th Infantry Regiment 48th Infantry Regiment		36th Infantry Regiment 38th Infantry Regiment 48th Infantry Regiment	
12th Artillery Regiment		40th Artillery Battalion	
12th Artillery Regiment		41st Artillery Battalion	
12th Artillery Regiment		84th Artillery Battalion	

== Commanders ==
12th Infantry Brigade (Hungarian: 12. gyalogdosztály)

- Brigadier General József Benke (23 Jan 1939 - 1 Feb 1940)
- Brigadier General Kalmán Török (1 Feb 1940 - 1 Aug 1941)
- Brigadier General Gábor Illésházy (1 Aug 1941 - 17 Feb 1942)

12th Light Division (Hungarian: 12. könnyűhadosztály)

- Brigadier General Gábor Illésházy (17 Feb 1942 - 8 Aug 1942)
- Colonel Elemér Sáska (8 Aug 1942 - 23 Sep 1942)
- Brigadier General Ulászlo Solymossy (1 Oct 1942 - 10 Aug 1943)

12th Reserve Division (Hungarian: 12. tartalék hadosztály)

- Brigadier General Jénö Bor (10 Aug 1943 - 5 Apr 1944)
- Brigadier General Dézö Pötze (5 Apr 1944 - ? May 1944)
- Brigadier General Béla Németh (? May 1944 - 28 Sep 1944)
- Colonel Jenö Tömöry (29 Sep 1944 - 23 Oct 1944)

12th Infantry Division (Hungarian: 12. gyalogdosztály)

- Colonel Jenö Tömöry (23 Oct 1944 - 26 Oct 1944)
- Brigadier General Ference Mikófalvy (26 Oct 1944 - 6 Dec 1944)
- Brigadier General István Baumann (6 Dec 1944 - 12 Feb 1945)
