= Librazhd Sector =

Defensive sector of the Royal Italian Army in Albania

The Librazhd Sector was a corps-sized defensive sector of the Royal Italian Army in Albania during World War II that defended against an offensive during the invasion of Yugoslavia.
