= I Corps (Hungary) =

- Active: 1 October 1936 – 12 February 1945
- Country: Kingdom of Hungary
- Branch: Royal Hungarian Army
- Type: Infantry
- Size: Corps
- Engagements: World War II

The I Corps was a formation of the Royal Hungarian Army that participated in the Axis invasion of Yugoslavia during World War II.

== Commanders ==
- Major General Vilmos Nagy de Nagybaczon (1 Oct 1936 - 1 Feb 1939)
- Major General Gusztáv Jány (1 Feb 1939 - 1 Mar 1940)
- Major General Zoltán Decleva (1 Mar 1940 - 1 May 1941)
- Major General Imre Ruszkiczay-Rüdiger (1 May 1941 - 1 Nov 1942)
- Major General József Németh II (1 Nov 1942 - 1 Nov 1943)
- Major General Béla Aggteleky (1 Nov 1943 - 1 Aug 1944)
- Major General Szilárd Bakay (1 Aug 1944 - 8 Oct 1944)
- Major General Béla Aggteleky (8 Oct 1944 - 15 Oct 1944)
- Lieutenant General Iván Hindy (16 Oct 1944 - 12 Feb 1945)
