= 2nd Infantry Brigade (Hungary) =

The 2nd Infantry Brigade was a formation of the Royal Hungarian Army that participated in the Axis invasion of Yugoslavia during World War II.
