= 10th Infantry Brigade (Hungary) =

- Hungarian: 10. gyalogdandár
- Active: 1940–45
- Disbanded: 12 February 1945
- Country: Kingdom of Hungary
- Branch: Royal Hungarian Army
- Type: Infantry
- Size: Brigade
- Part of: IV Corps

The 10th Infantry Brigade was a formation of the Royal Hungarian Army that participated in the Axis invasion of Yugoslavia during World War II.

== Organisation ==
10th Infantry Brigade (Hungarian: 10. gyalogdandár) 1 March 1940 to 16 February 1942	10th Light Division (Hungarian: 10. könnyűhadosztály) 17 February 1942 to 10 August 1943 (Note: The 10th Light Division became the 10th Infantry Division on 10 August 1943)	10th Infantry Division (Hungarian: 10. gyalogdosztály) 10 August 1943 to 12 February 1945 (Note: disbanded on 12 February 1945)
6th Infantry Regiment 36th Infantry Regiment		6th Infantry Regiment 8th Infantry Regiment 18th Infantry Regiment
10th Artillery Regiment		10th Artillery Battalion
10th Artillery Regiment		11th Artillery Battalion
10th Artillery Regiment		12th Artillery Battalion
10th Artillery Regiment		74th Artillery Battalion

== Commanders ==
=== 10th Infantry Brigade ===
- Brigadier General Dezsö Füleky (23 Jan 1939 - ? July 1939)
- Colonel Frigyes Gyimessy (1 Aug 1939 - 1 Mar 1940)
- Brigadier General Ferenc Peterdy (1 Mar 1940 - 1 Oct 1941)
- Brigadier General Jenö Felkl (1 Oct 1941 - 17 Feb 1942)

=== 10th Light Division ===
- Brigadier General Jenö Felkl (17 Feb 1943 - 1 May 1942)
- Colonel Belá Tanitó (1 May 1942 - ? Sep 1942)
- General László Molnár (? Sep 1942 - 10 Aug 1943)

=== 10th Infantry Division ===
- Brigadier General István Kudriczy (10 Aug 1943 - 15 June 1944)
- Brigadier General Kornél Oszlányi (15 June 1944 - 5 Dec 1944)
- Brigadier General József Kisfaludy (5 Dec 1944 - ? Dec 1944)
- Colonel Sándor András (? Dec 1944 - 12 Feb 1945)
