= 1st Infantry Brigade (Hungary) =

Royal Hungarian Army combat formation

- Country: Kingdom of Hungary
- Branch: Royal Hungarian Army
- Type: Infantry
- Size: Brigade
- Engagements: World War II: Invasion of Yugoslavia

The 1st Infantry Brigade was a formation of the Royal Hungarian Army that participated in the Axis invasion of Yugoslavia during World War II.

== Organization ==
Structure of the division:

- Headquarters
- 1st Infantry Regiment
- 31st Infantry Regiment
- 1st Artillery Regiment
- 1st Independent Cavalry Squadron
- 1st Anti-Aircraft Battery
- 1st Signal Company
- 1st Service Regiment
- Attached Mining Section
