= V Corps (Hungary) =

- Country: Kingdom of Hungary
- Branch: Royal Hungarian Army
- Type: Infantry

The V Corps was a formation of the Royal Hungarian Army.

== History ==
The V Corps participated in the Axis invasion of Yugoslavia during World War II between 6–18 April 1941.
It didn't participate in Operation Barbarossa against the Soviet Union, but served as part of the Hungarian occupation force in Yugoslavia. In March 1944, it was stationed along the Danube River, between the mouth of the Drava river and Titel.

When the Soviets approached the border with Hungary, the V Corps was added to the First Hungarian Army on 4 August 1944 and deployed against the Soviets until the end of the war.

== Commanders ==
- Major General Antal Silley (1 Aug 1939 – 1 Aug 1941)
- Major General Ferenc Feketehalmy-Czeydner (1 Aug 1941 – 20 Aug 1942)
- Major General Frigyes Gyimessy (20 Aug 1942 – 1 Aug 1943)
- Major General Pál Platthy (1 Aug 1943 – 1 May 1944)
- Major General Zoltán Algya-Pap (1 Sep 1944 – 15 Nov 1944)
- Major General Miklós Nagyöszy (15 Nov 1944 – 17 Dec 1944)
- Major General Mihály Ibrányi (17 Dec 1944 – 1 Mar 1945)
- Major General József Vasváry (1 Mar 1945 – May 1945)
