= Invasion of Yugoslavia =

1941 Axis campaign during World War II

- Part of the Balkans campaign of World War II and World War II in Yugoslavia
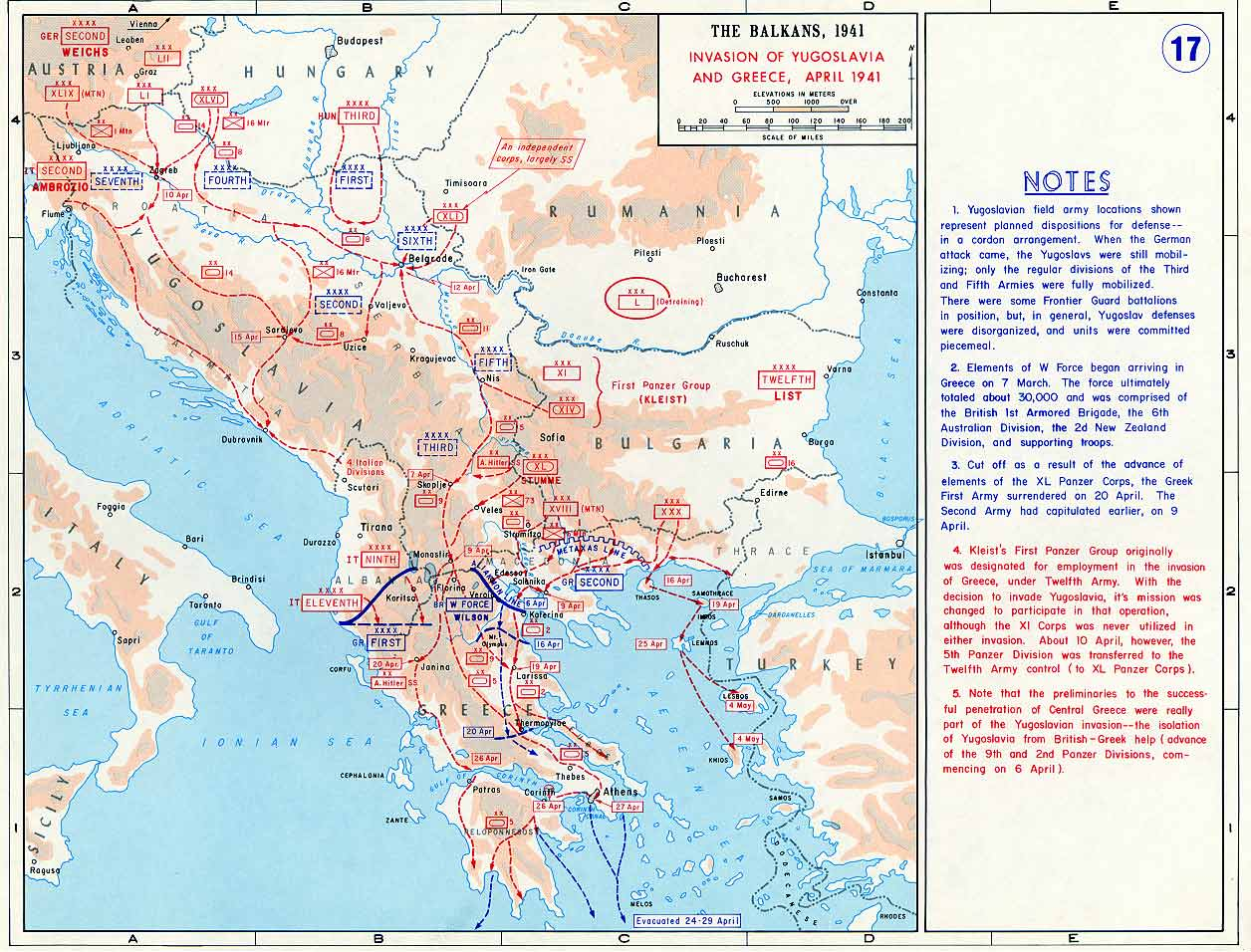
- The movements of the Axis forces in Yugoslavia and Greece
Date	6–18 April 1941 (1 week and 5 days)
Location	Yugoslavia
Result	Axis victory; Continued anti-Axis resistance and beginning of World War II in Yugoslavia
Territorial changes	Occupation of Yugoslavia; Partition of Yugoslavia between the Axis; Creation of pro-Axis puppet regimes Establishment of the NDH

Belligerents
Axis: Germany; Italy; Hungary	Yugoslavia

Commanders and leaders
(Nazi Germany) Walther von Brauchitsch; (Nazi Germany) Maximilian von Weichs; (Nazi Germany) Wilhelm List; (Nazi Germany) Ewald von Kleist; (Kingdom of Italy) Vittorio Ambrosio; (Kingdom of Italy) Alessandro Pirzio Biroli; (Kingdom of Hungary (1920–1946)) Elemér Gorondy-Novák; Leopold Supančić	(Kingdom of Yugoslavia) Dušan Simović; (Kingdom of Yugoslavia) Danilo Kalafatović (surrendered); (Kingdom of Yugoslavia) Milorad Petrović (POW); (Kingdom of Yugoslavia) Milutin Nedić (surrendered); (Kingdom of Yugoslavia) Milan Nedić (surrendered); (Kingdom of Yugoslavia) Vladimir Cukavac (surrendered); (Kingdom of Yugoslavia) Dimitrije Živković (surrendered)

Strength
Germany: 337,096; 875 tanks 990 aircraft Italy: 300,000 in 22 divisions 666 aircraft Hungary: 9 brigades 6 air squadrons	700,000 (400,000 ill-prepared); 110–200 tanks (50–54 of which were modern); 460–505 aircraft (including 103 modern bombers and 107 modern fighters)

Casualties and losses
Germany: 151 killed 392 wounded 15 missing 40 aircraft shot down Italy: 800 killed 2,500 wounded 10+ aircraft shot down 22 aircraft damaged Hungary: 120 killed 223 wounded 13 missing 7 aircraft shot down	Thousands of civilians & soldiers killed 254,000–345,000 captured (by the Germans); 30,000 captured (by the Italians); 49 aircraft shot down 103 pilots & aircrew killed 210–300 aircraft captured 3 destroyers captured 3 submarines captured

The invasion of Yugoslavia, also known as the April War (Note: Slovene: Aprilska vojna, Serbian: Априлски рат, romanized: Aprilski rat, Croatian: Travanjski rat) or Operation 25, (Note: German: Unternehmen 25 or Projekt 25) was a German-led attack on the Kingdom of Yugoslavia by the Axis powers which began on 6 April 1941 during World War II. The order for the invasion was put forward in "Führer Directive No. 25", which Adolf Hitler issued on 27 March 1941, following a Yugoslav coup d'état that overthrew the pro-Axis government.

The invasion commenced with an overwhelming air attack on Belgrade and facilities of the Royal Yugoslav Air Force (VVKJ) by the Luftwaffe (German Air Force) and attacks by German land forces from southwestern Bulgaria. These attacks were followed by German thrusts from Romania, Hungary and the Ostmark (modern-day Austria, then part of Germany). Italian forces were limited to air and artillery attacks until 11 April, when the Italian Army attacked towards Ljubljana (in modern-day Slovenia) and through Istria and Lika and down the Dalmatian coast. On the same day, Hungarian forces entered Yugoslav Bačka and Baranya, but like the Italians they faced practically light resistance. Italians moved into Dalmatia also from Italian-controlled Albania, after repelling an initial Yugoslav attack there.

Scholars have proposed several theories to explain the sudden collapse of the Royal Yugoslav forces, including poor training and equipment, generals eager to secure a quick cessation of hostilities, and fifth column activities by groups of Croatians, Slovenians, and ethnic Germans. The latter has been questioned by scholars who have suggested that the fifth column had little effect on the ultimate outcome. The invasion ended when an armistice was signed on 17 April 1941, based on the unconditional surrender of the Yugoslav army, which came into effect at noon on 18 April. The Kingdom of Yugoslavia was then occupied and partitioned by the Axis powers. Most of Serbia and the Banat became a German zone of occupation while other areas of Yugoslavia were annexed by neighboring Axis countries, Germany, Hungary, Italy, Albania and Bulgaria. Croatia became the Independent State of Croatia (NDH), an Axis puppet state created during the invasion comprising the Srem, Bosnia and Herzegovina as well as the Croatian lands. Along with Italy's stalled invasion of Greece on 28 October 1940, and the German-led invasion of Greece (Operation Marita) and invasion of Crete (Operation Merkur), the invasion of Yugoslavia was part of the German Balkan Campaign (German: Balkanfeldzug).

On April 7 and 8, 1941, while the operation was underway, there was a rebellion in Bjelovar in which Croatian soldiers, including those covertly allied with the Ustaše, revolted against the Yugoslav regime. The uprising led to the seizure of military and civilian installations in that city and contributed to the disintegration of the Yugoslav rule in the region.

== Background ==
In October 1940, Fascist Italy had attacked the Kingdom of Greece only to be forced back into Italian-occupied Albania. German dictator Adolf Hitler recognised the need to go to the aid of his ally, Italian dictator Benito Mussolini. Hitler did this not only to restore diminished Axis prestige, but also to prevent Britain from bombing the Romanian Ploiești oilfields from which Nazi Germany obtained most of its oil.

In 1940 and early 1941, Hungary, Romania, and Bulgaria all agreed to adhere to the Tripartite Pact and thus join the Axis. Hitler then pressured Yugoslavia to join as well. The Regent, Prince Paul, yielded to this pressure, and declared Yugoslavia's accession to the Pact on 25 March 1941. This move was highly unpopular with the Serb-dominated officer corps of the military, Serbian organizations such as National Defense and the Chetniks Association, the Serbian Orthodox Church, a large part of the Serbian population as well as liberals and Communists. Military officers (predominantly Serbs) executed a coup d'état on 27 March 1941, forced the Regent to resign, and declared 17-year-old King Peter II to be of age.

== Preparation ==
Upon hearing news of the coup in Yugoslavia, Hitler called his military advisers to Berlin on 27 March. On the same day as the coup he issued Führer Directive No. 25, which called for Yugoslavia to be treated as a hostile state. Hitler took the coup as a personal insult, and was so angered that he was determined, in his words, "to destroy Yugoslavia militarily and as a state" (Jugoslawien militärisch und als Staatsgebilde zu zerschlagen) and to do so "with pitiless harshness" and "without waiting for possible declarations of loyalty of the new government".

Hungary had joined the Tripartite Pact on 20 November 1940. On 12 December, it also concluded a treaty with Yugoslavia calling for "permanent peace and eternal friendship". The Hungarian leadership was split after Germany's War Directive 25 was delivered on 27 March 1941. Regent Miklós Horthy and the military favoured taking part in the invasion of Yugoslavia and mobilized the following day. Prime Minister Pál Teleki sought to prevent German troops passing through Hungary and cited the peace treaty with Yugoslavia as an impediment to co-operation with the Germans.

On 1 April, Yugoslavia redesignated its Assault Command as the Chetnik Command, named after the Serb guerrilla forces from World War I, which had resisted the Central Powers. The command was intended to lead a guerrilla war if the country was occupied. Its headquarters was transferred from Novi Sad to Kraljevo in south-central Serbia on 1 April.

On 2 April, the German ambassador having already been recalled for "talks", the remaining embassy staff were ordered to leave the capital and to warn the embassies of friendly nations to likewise evacuate. That sent the unmistakable message that Yugoslavia was about to be invaded.

On 3 April, Hitler issued War Directive 26 detailing the plan of attack and command structure for the invasion as well as promising Hungary territorial gains. The same day Teleki killed himself. Horthy, seeking a compromise, informed Hitler that evening that Hungary would abide by the treaty, though it would likely cease to apply should Croatia secede, and Yugoslavia cease to exist. Upon the proclamation of the Independent State of Croatia (Serbo-Croatian Latin: Nezavisna Država Hrvatska, or NDH) in Zagreb on 10 April, this scenario was realized, and Hungary joined the invasion, its army crossing into Yugoslavia the following day.

== Opposing forces ==
=== Axis order of battle ===
The invasion was spearheaded by the German 2nd Army with elements of the 12th Army, First Panzer Group, and an independent panzer corps combined with overwhelming Luftwaffe support. The 19 German divisions included five panzer divisions, two motorised infantry divisions and two mountain divisions. The German force also included three well-equipped independent motorised infantry regiments and was supported by over 750 aircraft. The Italian 2nd Army and 9th Army committed a total of 22 divisions and 666 aircraft to the operation. The Hungarian 3rd Army also participated in the invasion, with support available from over 500 aircraft.

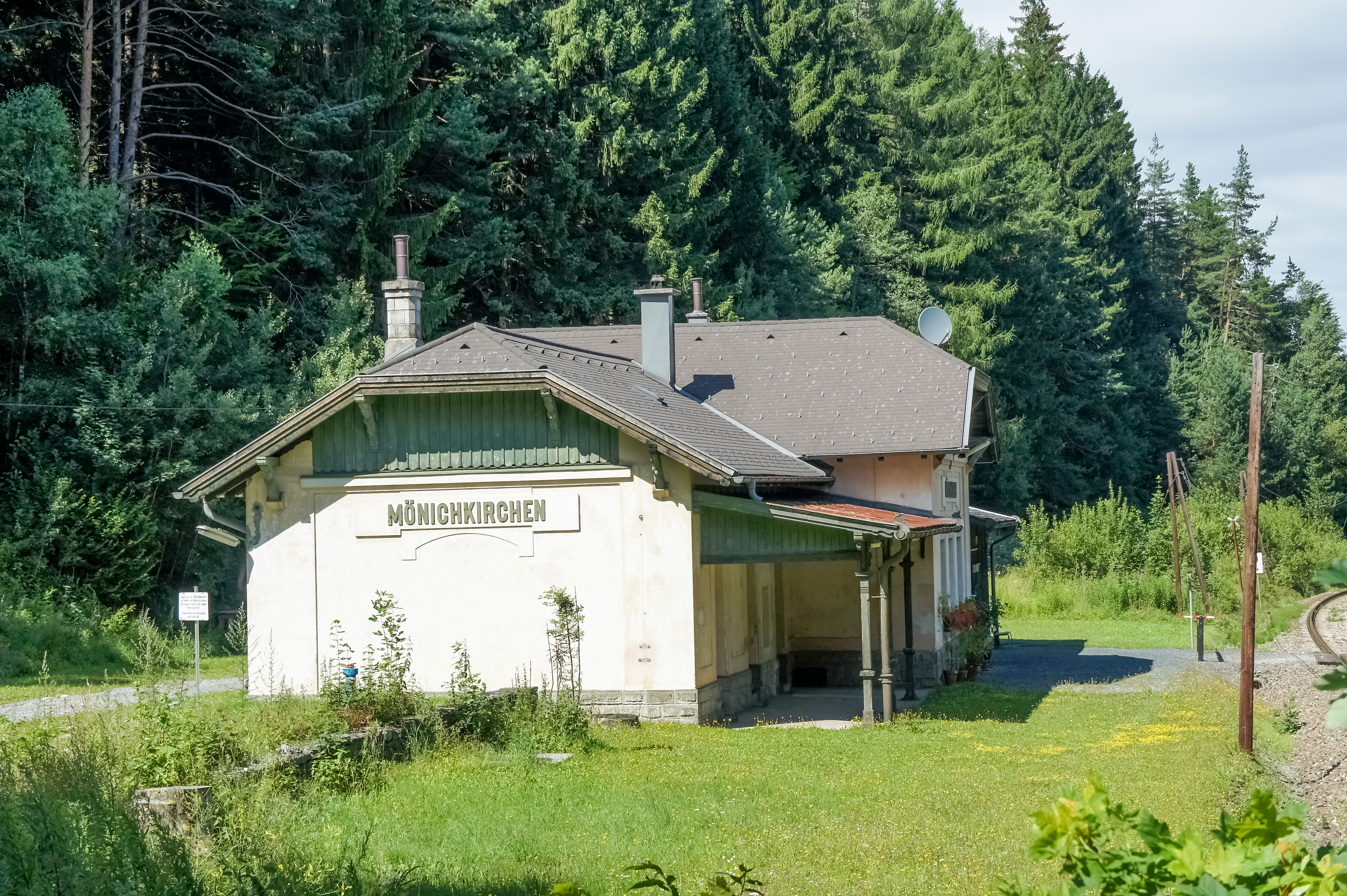
The goods station at Mönichkirchen was Hitler's headquarters, Frühlingssturm, during the invasion.

During the April War, the Führer Headquarters (FHQ) was codenamed Frühlingssturm (Spring Storm) and consisted of the Führersonderzug (Special Führer's Train) codenamed "Amerika" stationed in Mönichkirchen alongside the special train "Atlas" of the Armed Forces Operations Staff (Wehrmachtführungsstabes, WFSt). "Atlas" did not arrive at Mönichkirchen until 11 April, well after operations were underway, and "Amerika" only arrived the following day. Mönichkirchen was chosen because a nearby rail tunnel could provide shelter in the event of air attack. Both trains returned to Berlin on 26 April.

After the Italian invasion in the northwest began, King Victor Emmanuel III moved to a villa owned by the Pirzio Biroli family at Brazzacco, near Moruzzo, in order to be close to the front.

Germany attacked Yugoslavia from bases in three countries besides itself: Hungary, Romania, and Bulgaria. German troops entered each of these countries under different pretenses and at different times. The first country to receive a German military mission was Romania. Ostensibly to train the Romanian armed forces, its real purpose was to protect Romania's petroleum resources and prepare for an attack on the Soviet Union. The Wehrmacht entered Bulgaria more circumspectly, first with the intention of providing aerial defense against any force attacking Romania's oilfields and later with that of invading Greece in support of Italy. German troops did not enter Hungary until the attack on Yugoslavia was already planned and Hungary's participation had been secured.

==== Deployment in Romania ====
King Carol II of Romania, starting from the cession of Bessarabia and Northern Bukovina to the Soviet Union, proposed in a letter to Adolf Hitler on 2 July 1940 that Germany send a military mission to Romania. The Romanian government asked that a mission be sent urgently on 7 September 1940, the day after Carol's abdication. The decision to aid Romania was taken on 19 September, and Hungary was asked to provide transit to German soldiers on 30 September. The first troops entered Romania on 10 October. They entered Bucharest two days later (12 October) to shouts of Heil! The official explanation for the presence of German troops was that they were there to train the Romanian army. Hitler's directive to the troops on 10 October had stated that "it is necessary to avoid even the slightest semblance of military occupation of Romania." In the second half of October, the Romanian leader, Ion Antonescu, asked that the military mission be expanded. The Germans happily obliged the request, since the oil fields and refineries at Ploiești were vital to their war effort. Romania was also an important launching point for an attack on the Soviet Union, which made the presence of German troops a violation of the Molotov–Ribbentrop Pact of 23 August 1939.

By the middle of November, the 13th Motorised Infantry Division had been assembled in Romania and reinforced by the 4th Panzer Regiment, engineers, and signal troops, as well as six fighter and two reconnaissance Luftwaffe squadrons, and some anti-aircraft artillery. A total of seventy batteries of artillery were moved into Romania. On 23 November, Romania signed the Tripartite Pact. At the time Germany informed Romania that she would not be expected to participate in an attack on Greece, but that Germany wanted to use Romanian territory to provide a base for a German attack. On 24 November, Antonescu met with Wilhelm Keitel, chief of the Oberkommando der Wehrmacht, to discuss common defense. As a result of this meeting, the 16th Panzer Division was sent to Romania in late December. The 12th Army and First Panzer Group, along with heavy bridging equipment for the planned crossing of the Danube, followed in January 1941. By January 1941 the total number of German effectives in Romania was 170,639. Those elements of the 12th Army that were to invade Yugoslavia from Romania assembled near Timișoara (Temeschwar).

Between November 1940 and February 1941, the Luftwaffe gradually moved 135 fighters and reconnaissance aircraft into Romania (in 22–26 squadrons). In early April 1941 they moved a further 600 aircraft from France, Africa, and Sicily into Romania and Bulgaria in a period of ten days. The fighter and reconnaissance craft were sent to fields in Arad, Deva, and Turnu Severin. On 12 February Britain broke off diplomatic relations with Romania on the grounds that it was an enemy-occupied country.

==== Deployment in Bulgaria ====
Two events in early November 1940 convinced Hitler of the need to station troops, especially the Luftwaffe, in Bulgaria. The first was false reports that the British were constructing an airfield on Lemnos, from which they could bomb Ploiești. The second was the beginning of British air raids originating from Greek bases against Italian shipping on 6 November. Planning for the German invasion of Greece from Bulgaria began on 12 November.

Already on 13 November, the Soviets were (incorrectly) accusing the Germans of having troops in neutral Bulgaria. On 18 November, Tsar Boris III of Bulgaria met with Hitler and promised to participate in an attack on Greece, but only at the last moment. Shortly thereafter a secret German team under Colonel Kurt Zeitzler entered Bulgaria to establish fuel depots, arrange for troop billeting and scout the terrain. They were soon followed by hundreds of Luftwaffe personnel to establish air observation stations. By the end of December over a thousand German troops in civilian clothing were active in Bulgaria, although the latter's government continued to deny it. Bombers and dive-bombers were also gradually moved into Bulgaria, beginning in November. By the end of March 1941, the Luftwaffe had 355 aircraft in the country.

On 17 February 1941, Bulgaria signed a non-aggression pact with Turkey, paving the way for its adherence to the Tripartite Pact, which was signed by Prime Minister Bogdan Filov in Vienna on 1 March. When Ivan V. Petrov, member of the National Assembly from Yablanitsa, asked why the Assembly had not been consulted, Filov pointed out that the constitution only required parliamentary approval prior to ratification. The signing was ratified by a vote in the Assembly of 140 to 20. The first German troops crossed the Danube from Romania on 28 February, a day before Bulgaria joined the pact. The greater part of the 12th Army, augmented by VIII. Fliegerkorps, crossed the Danube on 2 March. They were welcomed by the Russophile population, who believed that Germany and the Soviet Union were allied. The 12th Army was originally deployed solely for an attack on Greece. After receiving Directive No. 25, which projected an invasion of Yugoslavia in the direction of Belgrade on 8 April, the force was redeployed in three groups: one along the Turkish border, one along the Greek border and one along the Yugoslav border. Motorized transport was brought in from Romania to achieve this feat in a few days.

==== Deployment in Hungary ====
Although German troops had been refused the right to transit Hungary for the invasion of Poland in 1939, they were permitted to pass through Hungary as civilians on their way to Romania in 1940. In September 1940 the Hungarian legation in Berlin had granted over 6,500 transit visas to Germans traveling to Romania. On 30 September, shortly after the signing of the Tripartite Pact, Ribbentrop and General Keitel asked the Hungarian foreign minister, István Csáky, who was in Vienna, to grant the Germans use of transit facilities for German military "study groups" to pass through to Romania. They were still awaiting final confirmation on 3 October. The arrangement agreed was that six trains would pass through Hungary at night carrying German soldiers in sealed cars. They would not be allowed out, and they would not have any rail transportation officers (RTOs) or supply officers with them.

According to György Barcza, the Hungarian ambassador in London, answering the British government's query, it was Romania that had made the request. In his notes, Barcza indicated that the British had declared that "if Hungary were to permit German troops to pass through Hungarian territory against Yugoslavia, Britain would break off diplomatic relations, indeed might declare war on us." The first German troops began their passage through Hungary on 8 October. Despite some official denials, the troops movements were reported by Reuters and the American ambassador received a full report. According to contemporary British intelligence, three divisions had passed through Hungary to Romania by 2 November. On 20 November, Hungarian Prime Minister Pál Teleki signed the Tripartite Pact after a meeting with Hitler in Berchtesgarden. At the meeting, Hitler spoke of his intention to aid Italy against Greece, thereby preparing the Hungarians for his future demands.

On 13 December 1940—the day after the Hungaro-Yugoslav Non-Aggression Pact and the day Hitler issued Führer Directive No. 20—major German troop movements began. The Germans had initially promised to supply 180 locomotives for the transfers, but later the Hungarians were complaining that only 130 had arrived. On 24 December, István Horthy, President of Hungarian State Railways (HSR), demanded negotiations before implementing requested German increases, but Ambassador Otto von Erdmannsdorf informed him that it had all been settled in Vienna by Keitel and Csáky. The German traffic was so large that on 28 December the HSR had to suspend travel on all its trains for several days on account of a shortage of coal. Hungarian officials tried to meet all German demands without going further than the governments had agreed. Even sabotage was used on occasion to prevent having to give the Germans more support than required. On 18 January 1941 an agreement was reached to store German supplies in Hungarian warehouses under Hungarian guard, with only a German officer in Budapest to serve as a liaison. These supplies were to be used in the campaign against Greece.

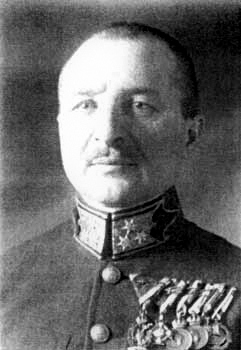
Hungarian chief-of-staff Werth was a leading proponent and key planner of Hungary's involvement in the invasion.

On 27 March 1941, Hitler informed the Hungarian ambassador, Döme Sztójay, and gave an official proposal to Hungary for participation in the attack on Yugoslavia. Hitler confidentially told Miklós Horthy that Germany fully recognizes the Hungarian territorial claims in relation to Yugoslavia and that he can take Bačka and Banat, and added "take as much as you want". Horthy mostly agreed and accepted Hitler's suggestions. A Hungarian response was hammered out in council and delivered the following day (28 March). On 30 March, General Friedrich Paulus arrived in Budapest and met with Henrik Werth, chief of the Hungarian general staff, and Major General László Deseő. The Hungarians proposed they mobilize five divisions for the attack on Yugoslavia. Two were to be held in reserve, while the First, Fifth and Mobile Corps were to conduct the main attack on Subotica (Szabadka), with a secondary operation east of the river Tisza. Because of Romania's request that Hungarian troops not operate in the Banat, Paulus modified the Hungarian plan and kept their troops west of the Tisza. This final plan "was put down in map form", according to Paulus' account, and must have been telephoned to Berlin immediately so as to make into Operational Order No. 25, issued by Walther von Brauchitsch that same day.

This final plan committed one Hungarian corps of three brigades west of the Danube from Lake Balaton to Barcs, and twelve brigades (nine on the front and three in reserve) for an offensive in Bačka (Bácska). The Danube Flotilla was to cover the flanks, and the air force was to stand by for orders. The "Carpathian Group", composed of Eighth Corps, the 1st Mountain Brigade and the 8th Border Guard (Chasseur) Brigade, was mobilized on the Soviet border, with the Mobile Corps held in reserve.

These arrangements were agreed to by Werth, he later claimed, "on the basis of the authorization received" on 28 April—although this was not the government's view of what had been authorized. Werth applied for permission to mobilize on 1 April, since a mobilization order had to be approved by the cabinet and issued by the regent over the signature of the minister of defense. Werth expected the Germans to begin operations, with the use of Hungarian territory and communications, on 12 April and the Hungarians to complete mobilization by 6 April and begin their offensive on the 15th. A meeting of the Supreme Defense Council was convened for 1 April to discuss Werth's request. After a long debate, it approved his mobilization plan, but refused to place Hungarian troops under German command and restricted Hungarian operations to the occupation of territory abandoned by the Yugoslavs. On 2 April Germany responded that the Paulus–Werth agreement was final, and German staff officers began arriving in Budapest that day. That same day the British informed Hungary that she would be treated as an enemy state if Germany made use of her territory or facilities in an attack on Yugoslavia. On the morning of 3 April, Pál Teleki committed suicide; the regent immediately cancelled the mobilization order already given except for the Border Guard and the Mobile Corps, which prompted Werth to resign. Horthy then authorized the mobilization of the Fourth and Fifth Corps and the Mountain Brigade, and Werth withdrew his resignation. This occurred so late in the day that zero hour for mobilization to begin was given as midnight of 5 April. On the morning of 3 April, German units, including tanks and aircraft, bound for Romania passed openly through Budapest.

==== Deployment in Italy ====
The Italian 2nd Army and 9th Army committed a total of 22 divisions to the operation, comprising around 300,000 troops.

The Italian 2nd Army (Italian: 2° Armata) was commanded by Generale designato d'Armata (acting General) Vittorio Ambrosio, and consisted of one fast (Italian: celere) corps (Celere Corps), one motorised corps (Motorised Corps) and three infantry corps (V Corps, VI Corps, and XI Corps), and was assembled in northeastern Italy, attacking from Istria and the Julian March along the border with Slovenia and Croatia. The 2nd Army was supported by a motorised engineer regiment including three bridging battalions, a chemical battalion, fifteen territorial battalions, and two garrison battalions.

V Corps support units included three motorised artillery regiments comprising thirteen battalions, four machine gun battalions (two motorised and two pack animal), three Blackshirt legions of battalion size, a motorised anti-aircraft battalion, a sapper assault battalion and a road construction battalion. VI Corps included four motorised artillery regiments with a total of sixteen battalions, two machine gun battalions (one motorised, one pack animal) and a motorised anti-aircraft regiment. XI Corps included one motorised artillery regiment comprising four battalions, three machine gun battalions (one motorised, one pack animal and one static), and six Blackshirt legions of battalion size. The Motorised Corps was supported by a motorised artillery regiment consisting of three battalions, and a motorised engineer battalion.

In Albania, the elements of the Italian 9th Army (Italian: 9° Armata) that were involved in the campaign were commanded by Generale d'Armata (General) Alessandro Pirzio Biroli, and consisted of two infantry corps and some sector troops assembled in northern Albania.

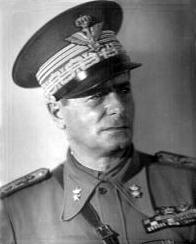
Alessandro Pirzio Biroli

XIV Corps was supported by a cavalry regiment, three Border Guard battalions, a Finance Guard battalion and two military police (Italian: Carabinieri Reali) battalions. The XVII Corps included the Diamanti Blackshirt group which incorporated six Blackshirt regiments comprising two battalions each, the Albanian-raised Skanderbeg Blackshirt regiment of two battalions, another Blackshirt regiment of two battalions, a cavalry regiment, a Bersaglieri motorcycle battalion, three Border Guard battalions, one Finance Guard battalion, a motorised artillery regiment of three battalions, a military police battalion, and a tank company equipped with Fiat M13/40 light tanks. The Librazhd Sector included a motorised artillery regiment of four battalions, a bicycle-mounted Bersaglieri regiment, a cavalry regiment, the Biscaccianti Blackshirt group which incorporated two Blackshirt regiments with a total of five battalions, the regimental-sized Agostini Blackshirt Forest Militia, and the Briscotto group, a regimental-sized formation consisting of one Alpini battalion and two Finance Guard battalions.

The Zara garrison numbered about 9,000 men under the overall command of Generale di Brigata (Brigadier) Emilio Giglioli. The garrison consisted of two main groupings and an assortment of supporting units. The two main groupings were the regimental-sized Fronte a Terra (Land Front), which comprised three static machine gun battalions and a bicycle-mounted Bersaglieri battalion, and the battalion-strength Fronte a Mare (Sea Front), which consisted of two machine gun companies, an anti-aircraft battery, a coastal artillery battery and a naval artillery battery. Supporting units consisted of an artillery regiment of three battalions, two independent artillery battalions, a machine gun battalion, a motorised anti-aircraft battalion (less one battery), an engineer battalion, a company of Blackshirts, and a company of L3/35 tankettes.

=== Royal Yugoslav armed forces ===
The Yugoslav forces consisted of more than 33 divisions of the Royal Yugoslav Army (Serbo-Croatian Latin: Vojska Kraljevska Jugoslavije, VKJ), four air brigades of the Royal Yugoslav Air Force (Serbo-Croatian Latin: Vazduhoplovstvo Vojske Kraljevine Jugoslavije, VVKJ) with more than 400 aircraft, and the small Royal Yugoslav Navy (Serbo-Croatian Latin: Kraljevska Jugoslovenska Ratna Mornarica, KJRM) centred around four destroyers and four submarines based on the Adriatic coast and some river monitors on the Danube. The VKJ was heavily reliant on animal-powered transport, was only partly mobilised at the time of the invasion, and had only 50 tanks that could engage German tanks on an equal basis. The VVKJ was equipped with a range of aircraft of Yugoslav, German, Italian, French and British design, including less than 120 modern fighter aircraft.

==== Equipment and organization ====
Formed after World War I, the VKJ was still largely equipped with weapons and material from that era, although some modernization with Czech equipment and vehicles had begun. Of about 4,000 artillery pieces, many were aged and horse-drawn, but about 1,700 were relatively modern, including 812 Czech 37mm and 47mm anti-tank guns. There were also about 2,300 mortars, including 1600 modern 81mm pieces, as well as twenty-four 220 and 305mm pieces. Of 940 anti-aircraft guns, 360 were 15 mm and 20 mm Czech and Italian models. All of these arms were imported, from different sources; the various models often lacked proper repair and maintenance facilities. The only mechanized units were six motorized infantry battalions in the three cavalry divisions, six motorized artillery regiments, two tank battalions equipped with 110 tanks, one of which had Renault FT models of First World War origin and the other 54 modern French Renault R35 tanks, plus an independent tank company with eight Czech T-32 (Š-I-D) tank destroyers. Some 1,000 trucks for military purposes had been imported from the United States of America in the months just preceding the invasion.

Fully mobilized, the Yugoslav Army fielded 28 infantry divisions, three cavalry divisions, and 35 independent regiments. Of the independent regiments, 16 were in frontier fortifications and 19 were organized as combined regiments, or "Odred", around the size of a reinforced brigade. Each Odred had one to three infantry regiments and one to three artillery battalions, with three organised as "alpine" units. The German attack, however, caught the army still mobilizing, and only some 11 divisions were in their planned defense positions at the start of the invasion. The Yugoslavs had delayed full mobilisation until 3 April in order not to provoke Hitler. The units were filled to between 70 and 90 percent of their strength as mobilization was not completed. The Yugoslav Army was about 1,200,000 in total as the German invasion commenced.

The VVKJ had a strength of 1,875 officers and 29,527 other ranks, including some 2,000 pilots, had over 460 front-line aircraft of domestic (notably the IK-3), German, Italian, French, and British origin, of which most were modern types. Organized into 22 bomber squadrons and 19 fighter squadrons, the main aircraft types in operational use included 73 Messerschmitt Bf 109 E, 47 Hawker Hurricane Mk I (with more being built under licence in Yugoslavia), 30 Hawker Fury II, 11 Rogožarski IK-3 fighters (plus more under construction), 10 Ikarus IK-2, 2 Potez 63, one Messerschmitt Bf 110C-4 (captured in early April due to a navigational error) and one Rogozarski R 313 fighters, 69 Dornier Do 17 K (including 40 plus licence-built), 61 Bristol Blenheim Mk I (including some 40 licence-built) and 40 Savoia Marchetti SM-79 K bombers. Army reconnaissance units consisted of seven Groups with 130 obsolete Yugoslav-built Breguet 19 and Potez 25 light bombers. There were also some 400 trainer and auxiliary aircraft. The Naval Aviation units comprised 75 aircraft in eight squadrons equipped with, amongst other auxiliary types, 12 German-built Dornier Do 22 K and 15 Rogozarski SIM-XIV-H locally designed and built maritime patrol float-planes.

The aircraft of the Yugoslav airline Aeroput, consisting mainly of six Lockheed Model 10 Electras, three Spartan Cruisers, and one de Havilland Dragon were mobilised to provide transport services to the VVKJ.

The KJRM was equipped with one elderly ex-German light cruiser (suitable only for training purposes), one large modern destroyer flotilla leader of British design, three modern destroyers of French design (two built in Yugoslavia plus another still under construction), one seaplane tender, four modern submarines (two older French-built and two British-built) and 10 modern motor torpedo boats (MTBs), of the older vessels, there were six ex-Austrian Navy medium torpedo boats, six mine-layers, four large armoured river monitors and various auxiliary craft.

==== Deployment ====
The Yugoslav Army was organized into three army groups and the coastal defense troops. The 3rd Army Group was the strongest with the 3rd, 3rd Territorial, 5th and 6th Armies defending the borders with Romania, Bulgaria and Albania. The 2nd Army Group with the 1st and 2nd Armies, defended the region between the Iron Gates and the Drava River. The 1st Army Group with the 4th and 7th Armies, composed mainly of Croatian troops, was in Croatia and Slovenia defending the Italian, German (Austrian) and Hungarian frontiers.

The strength of each "Army" amounted to little more than a corps, with the Army Groups consisting of the units deployed as follows:

- 3rd Army Group's 3rd Army consisted of four infantry divisions and one cavalry odred; the 3rd Territorial Army with three infantry divisions and one independent motorized artillery regiment; the 5th Army with four infantry divisions, one cavalry division, two odred and one independent motorized artillery regiment and the 6th Army with three infantry divisions, the two Royal Guards brigades (odred) and three infantry odred.
- 2nd Army Group's 1st Army had one infantry and one cavalry division, three odred and six frontier defence regiments; the 2nd Army had three infantry divisions and one frontier defence regiment.
- 1st Army Group consisted of the 4th Army, with three infantry divisions and one odred, whilst the 7th Army had two infantry divisions, one cavalry division, three mountain odred, two infantry odred and nine frontier defence regiments.
- The Strategic, "Supreme Command" Reserve in Bosnia comprised four infantry divisions, four independent infantry regiments, one tank battalion, two motorized engineer battalions, two motorized heavy artillery regiments, 15 independent artillery battalions and two independent anti-aircraft artillery battalions.
- Coastal Defence Force, on the Adriatic opposite Zadar comprised one infantry division and two odred, in addition to fortress brigades and anti-aircraft units at Šibenik and Kotor.

On the eve of invasion, clothing and footwear were available for only two-thirds or so of the potential front-line troops and only partially for other troops; some other essential supplies were available for only a third of the front-line troops; medical and sanitary supplies were available for only a few weeks, and supplies of food for men and feed for livestock were available for only about two months. In all cases there was little or no possibility of replenishment.

Beyond the problems of inadequate equipment and incomplete mobilization, the Yugoslav Army suffered badly from the Serbo-Croat schism in Yugoslav politics. "Yugoslav" resistance to the invasion collapsed overnight. The main reason was that none of the subordinate national groups, including Slovenes and Croats, were prepared to fight in defence of a Serbian Yugoslavia. Also, so that the Slovenes did not feel abandoned, defences were built on Yugoslavia's northern border when the natural line of defence was much further south, based on the rivers Sava and Drina. The only effective opposition to the invasion was from wholly Serbian units within the borders of Serbia itself. The Germans, thrusting north-west from Skopje, were held up at Kacanik Pass and lost several tanks (P39, Buckley C "Greece and Crete 1941" HMSO 1977). In its worst expression, Yugoslavia's defenses were badly compromised on 10 April 1941, when some of the units in the Croatian-manned 4th and 7th Armies mutinied, and a newly formed Croatian government hailed the entry of the Germans into Zagreb the same day. The Serbian General Staff were united on the question of Yugoslavia as a "Greater Serbia", ruled, in one way or another, by Serbia. On the eve of the invasion, there were 165 generals on the Yugoslav active list. Of these, all but four were Serbs.

== Operations ==
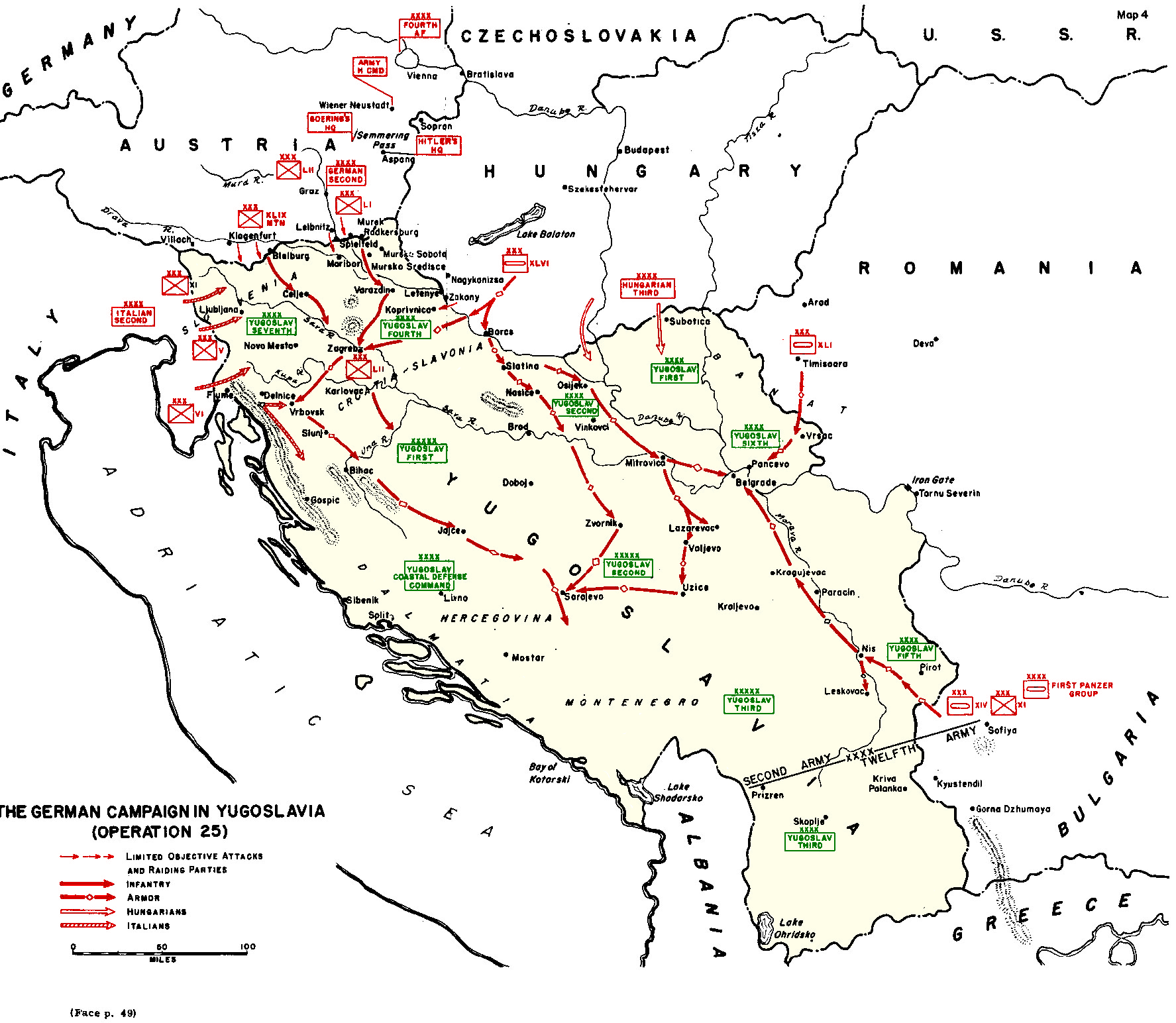
Map of the Axis attack (See this map for unit locations and movements.)

Professor Jozo Tomasevich and others divide the invasion and resultant fighting into two phases. The first phase encompasses the Luftwaffe's devastating air assault on Belgrade and airfields of the Royal Yugoslav Air Force of 6 April, and an initial thrust of the German XL Panzer Corps from Bulgaria towards Skopje that commenced the same day. This was followed by the assault of the German XIV Panzer Corps from Bulgaria towards Niš on 8 April. On 10 April, four more thrusts struck the Yugoslav Army; the XLI Panzer Corps from Romania towards Belgrade, the XLVI Panzer Corps from Hungary across the Drava, the LI Infantry Corps from Austria towards Zagreb, and the XLIX Mountain Corps from Austria towards Celje. By the end of that day, the Yugoslav Army was disintegrating, and was in retreat or surrendering right across the country, with the exception of the forces on the Albanian frontier. Italy and Hungary joined the ground offensive on 11 April. The Italian part in the ground offensive began when their 2nd Army attacked from northeastern Italy towards Ljubljana and down the Dalmatian coast, meeting virtually no resistance. On the same day, the Hungarian 3rd Army crossed the Yugoslav border and advanced toward Novi Sad, but like the Italians, they met no serious resistance. On 12 April, German troops captured Belgrade, and Ljubljana fell to the Italians. On 14 and 15 April, King Peter and the government flew out of the country, and the Yugoslav Supreme Command was captured by the Germans near Sarajevo. The surrender was signed on 17 April and came into effect at noon on 18 April.

=== Air operations ===
Following the Belgrade Coup on 27 March 1941, the Yugoslav armed forces were put on alert, although the army was not fully mobilised for fear of provoking Hitler. The VVKJ command decided to disperse its forces away from their main bases to a system of 50 auxiliary airfields that had previously been prepared. However, many of these airfields lacked facilities and had inadequate drainage which prevented the continued operation of all but the very lightest aircraft in the adverse weather conditions encountered in April 1941.

Despite having, on paper at any rate, a substantially stronger force of relatively modern aircraft than the combined British and Greek air forces to the south, the VVKJ could simply not match the overwhelming Luftwaffe and Regia Aeronautica superiority in terms of numbers, tactical deployment and combat experience.

The bomber and maritime force hit targets in Italy, Germany (Austria), Hungary, Romania, Bulgaria, Albania and Greece, as well as attacking German, Italian and Hungarian troops. Meanwhile, the fighter squadrons inflicted not insignificant losses on escorted Luftwaffe bomber raids on Belgrade and Serbia, as well as upon Regia Aeronautica raids on Dalmatia, Bosnia, Herzegovina and Montenegro. The VVKJ also provided direct air support to the hard pressed Yugoslav Army by strafing attacking troop and mechanized columns in Croatia, Bosnia and Serbia (sometimes taking off and strafing the troops attacking the very base being evacuated).

After a combination of air combat losses, losses on the ground to enemy air attack on bases and the overrunning of airfields by enemy troops, after 11 days the VVKJ almost ceased to exist. However, continued domestic aircraft production during the invasion supplied the VVKJ with an additional eight Hurricane Is, six Dornier Do 17Ks, four Blenheim Is, two Ikarus IK 2s, one Rogozarski IK-3 and one Messerschmitt Bf 109 from the local aeronautical industry's aircraft factories and workshops.

At the beginning of the April war, the VVKJ was armed with some 60 German designed Do 17Ks, purchased by Yugoslavia in the autumn of 1938, together with a manufacturing licence. The sole operator was 3 vazduhoplovni puk (3rd bomber regiment) composed of two bomber groups; the 63rd Bomber Group stationed at Petrovec airfield near Skopje and the 64th Bomber Group stationed at Milesevo airfield near Priština. Other auxiliary airfields had also been prepared to aid in dispersal.

During the course of hostilities, the State Aircraft Factory in Kraljevo managed to produce six more aircraft of this type. Of the final three, two were delivered to the VVKJ on 10 April and one was delivered on 12 April 1941.

On 6 April, Luftwaffe dive-bombers and ground-attack fighters destroyed 26 of the Yugoslav Dorniers in the initial assault on their airfields, but the remaining aircraft were able to effectively hit back with numerous attacks on German mechanized columns and upon Bulgarian airfields. By the end of the campaign total Yugoslav losses stood at four destroyed in aerial combat and 45 destroyed on the ground. On 14 and 15 April, the seven remaining Do 17K flew to Nikšić airfield in Montenegro and took part in the evacuation of King Peter II and members of the Yugoslav government to Greece. During this operation, Yugoslav gold reserves were also airlifted to Greece by the seven Do 17s, as well as by SM-79Ks and Lockheed Electra's but after completing their mission, five Do 17Ks were destroyed on the ground when Italian aircraft attacked the Greek-held Paramitia airfield. Only two Do 17Ks escaped destruction in Greece and later joined the British Royal Air Force (RAF) in the Kingdom of Egypt.

At 16:00 on 15 April the C-in-C of Luftflotte 4, Generaloberst Alexander Löhr received orders from Hermann Göring to wind down the air-offensive and transfer the bulk of the dive-bomber force to support the campaign in Greece.

A total of 18 bomber, transport and maritime patrol aircraft (two Dornier Do 17Ks, four Savoia Marchetti SM-79Ks, three Lockheed Electra's, eight Dornier Do-22Ks and one Rogozarski SIM-XIV-H) succeeded in escaping to the Allied base in Egypt at the end of the campaign.

==== Bombing of Belgrade ====
Luftflotte 4 of the Luftwaffe, with a strength of seven Combat Formations (Kampfgruppen) had been committed to the campaign in the Balkans. At 07:00 on 6 April the Luftwaffe opened the assault on Yugoslavia by conducting a saturation-type bombing raid on the capital, "Operation Retribution" (Unternehmen Strafgericht). Flying in relays from airfields in Austria and Romania, 300 aircraft, of which a quarter were Junkers Ju 87 Stukas, protected by a heavy fighter escort began the attack. The dive-bombers were to silence the Yugoslav anti-aircraft defences while the medium bombers consisting mainly Dornier Do 17s and Junkers Ju 88 attacked the city. The initial raid was carried out at 15-minute intervals in three distinct waves, each lasting for approximately 20 minutes. Thus, the city was subjected to a rain of bombs for almost one and a half hours. The German bombers directed their main effort against the center of the city, where the principal government buildings were located. The medium bomber Kampfgruppen continued their attack on the city for several days while the Stuka dive bomber wings (Stukageschwader) were soon diverted to Yugoslav airfields.

When the attack was over, some 4,000 inhabitants lay dead under the debris. This blow virtually destroyed all means of communication between the Yugoslav high command and the forces in the field, although most of the elements of the general staff managed to escape to one of the suburbs.

Having thus delivered the knockout blow to the Yugoslavian nerve center, the Luftwaffe was able to devote its maximum effort to military targets such as Yugoslav airfields, routes of communication, and troop concentrations, and to the close support of German ground operations.

The VVKJ put up its Belgrade defence interceptors from the six squadrons of the 32nd and 51st Fighter Groups to attack each wave of bombers, although as the day wore on the four squadrons from the 31st and 52nd Fighter Groups, based in central Serbia, also took part. The Messerschmitt Bf 109E, Hurricane Is and Rogozarski IK-3 fighters scored at least twenty "kills" amongst the attacking bombers and their escorting fighters on 6 April and a further dozen shot down on 7 April. The desperate defence by the VVKJ over Belgrade cost it some 20 fighters shot down and 15 damaged.

=== Ground operations ===
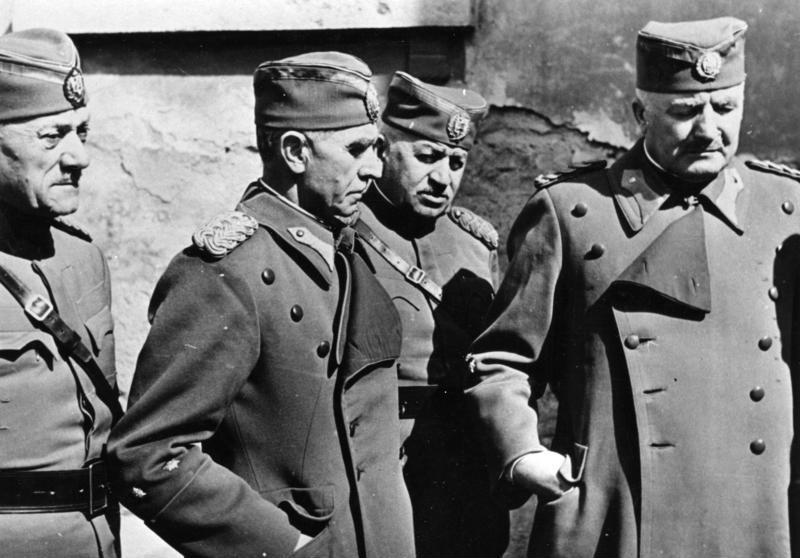
Captured Yugoslavian officers before their deportation to Germany

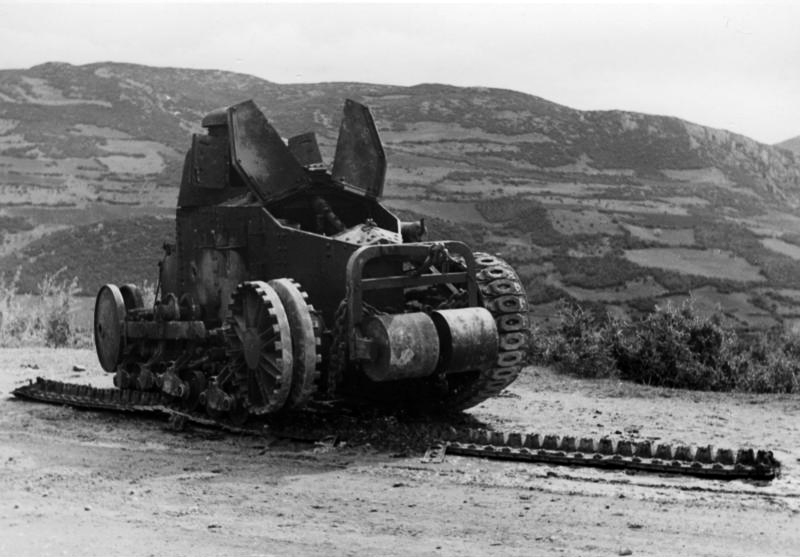
Destroyed Yugoslavian Renault NC tank

==== Three-pronged drive on Belgrade ====
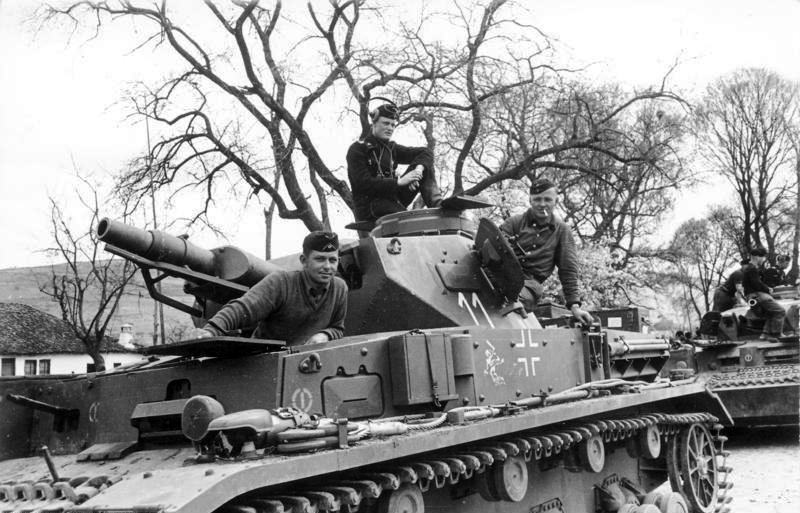
German Panzer IV of the 11th Panzer Division advancing into Yugoslavia from Bulgaria as part of the Twelfth Army

The British, Greek and Yugoslav high commands intended to use Niš as the lynchpin in their attempts to wear down German forces in the Balkans and it is for this reason that the locality was important. When the Germans broke through in this sector — a sector which was essential if stability was to be maintained on the front - the Yugoslav Supreme Command committed numerous forces from its strategic reserves, including the 2nd Cavalry Division, but these were harassed by the Luftwaffe during transit to the front and did not get through in any real quantities.

Having reached Niš from its initial attacks from Bulgaria and broken the Yugoslav defences, the German 14th Motorised Corps headed north in the direction of Belgrade. The German 46th Panzer Corps had advanced across the Slavonian plain from Austria to attack Belgrade from the west, whilst the 41st Panzer Corps threatened the city from the north after launching its offensive drive from Romania and Hungary. By 11 April, Yugoslavia was criss-crossed by German armoured columns and the only resistance that remained was a large nucleus of the Yugoslav Army around the capital. On 11 April, a German officer, Fritz Klingenberg with few men, moved into Belgrade to reconnoitre the city. However, after some scattered combat with Yugoslav troops, they entered the centre of the city, whereupon they bluffed about their size and incoming threats of bombardment. The city, represented by the Mayor, surrendered to them at 18:45 hours on 12 April. Later more forces moved to consolidate the position.

==== Italian offensive ====
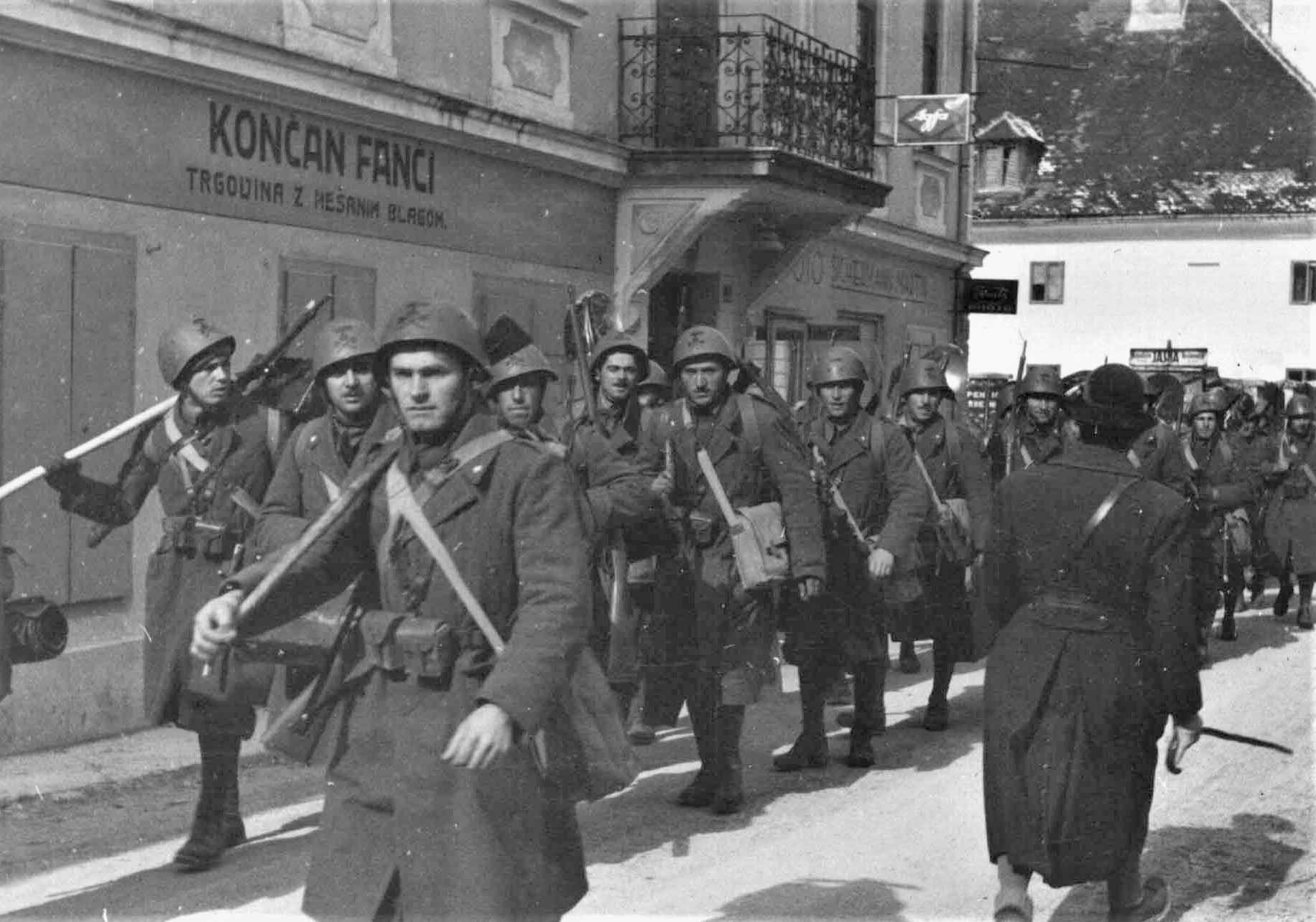
Italian soldiers entering Yugoslavia

In the opening days of the invasion, Italian forces on the Slovene border carried out minor actions in the Sava valley and in the Kastav area, capturing some Yugoslav positions on Mount Peč on 7 April, Kranjska Gora, Zavratec and Godz on 8 April, Kastav, the source of the Rječina river, Kalce and Logatec on 9 April, and repelling on 8 April a Yugoslav attack in the Cerkno Hills. On 11 April, the 2nd Army launched its offensive, capturing Ljubljana, Sušak and Kraljevica on the same day. On 12 April the 133rd Armoured Division Littorio and the 52nd Infantry Division "Torino" took Senj, on 13 April they occupied Otočac and Gradac, while Italian naval forces occupied several Dalmatian islands. A scheduled Yugoslav attack against the Italian enclave of Zara did not materialize, and the city garrison's troops started to advance until they met the "Torino" Division near Knin, which was taken on the same day. Split and Šibenik were taken on 15 and 16 April, respectively, and on 17 April the Motorized Corps took Dubrovnik, after covering 750 kilometers in six days.

After repelling the Yugoslav offensive in Albania, the 18th Infantry Division Messina took Cetinje, Dubrovnik and Kotor on 17 April, meeting with the Italian units of the Motorized Corps.

==== Hungarian offensive ====
On 12 April, the Hungarian Third Army crossed the border with one cavalry, two motorized and six infantry brigades. The Third Army faced the Yugoslavian First Army. By the time the Hungarians crossed the border, the Germans had been attacking Yugoslavia for over a week. As a result, the Yugoslavian forces confronting them put up little resistance, except for the units in the frontier fortifications, who had held up the Hungarian advance for some time. and inflicted some 350 casualties. Units of the Hungarian Third Army advanced into southern Baranja, located between the rivers Danube and Drava, and occupied the Bačka region in Vojvodina with Hungarian relative majority. The Hungarian forces occupied only those territories which were part of Hungary before the Treaty of Trianon.

==== Yugoslav Albanian offensive ====
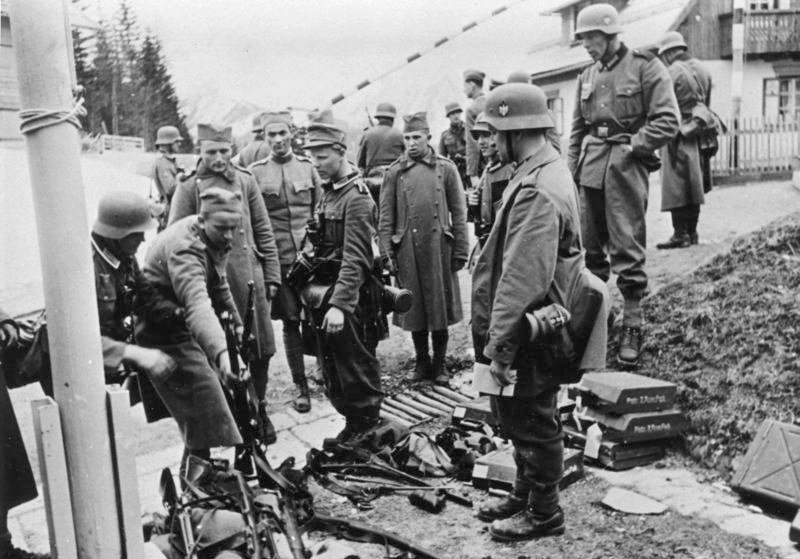
Yugoslav infantry surrendering

In accordance with the Yugoslav Army's war plan, R-41, a strategy was formulated that, in the face of a massive Axis attack, a retreat on all fronts except in the south be performed. Here the 3rd Yugoslav Army, in cooperation with the Greek Army, was to launch an offensive against the Italian forces in Albania. This was in order to secure space to enable the withdrawal of the main Yugoslav Army to the south. This would be via Albanian territory in order to reach Greece and the Allied forces to be based there. The strategy was based on the premise that the Yugoslav Army would, together with the Greek and British Armies, form a new version of the Salonika front of World War I.

On 8 April, the hard-pressed VVKJ sent a squadron of fourteen Breguet 19 light bombers to the city of Florina in northern Greece to provide assistance to both the Yugoslav and Greek Armies on the Macedonian front. The squadron performed numerous bombing and strafing missions during the course of the campaign.

The 3rd Yugoslav Army of the 3rd Army Group was tasked with conducting offensive operations against the Italian army in northern Albania. For this purpose, the 3rd Army had concentrated four infantry divisions and one combined regiment (Odred) in the Montenegro and Kosovo regions:

- 15th Infantry Division "Zetska"
- 13th Infantry Division "Hercegovačka"
- 31st Infantry Division "Kosovska"
- 25th Infantry Division "Vardarska"
- "Komski" cavalry Odred.

The strategic reserve of the 3rd Army Group, the 22nd Infantry Division "Ibarska", was situated around Uroševac in the Kosovo region.

In addition, offensive operations against the Italian enclave of Zara (Zadar) on the Dalmatian coast were to be undertaken by the 12th Infantry Division "Jadranska".

The first elements of the 3rd Army launched their offensive operations in North Albania on 7 April 1941, with the Komski Odred covering the Gusinje-Prokletije mountains area advancing towards the village of Raja-Puka. The Kosovska Division crossed the border in the Prizren area of Kosovo and was advancing through the Drin River valley. The Vardarska Division gained some local success at Debar, while the rest of the army's units were still assembling.

The next day, the 8th, found the Zetska Division steadily advancing along the Podgorica–Shkodër road. The Komski cavalry Odred successfully crossed the dangerous Prokletije mountains and reached the village of Koljegcava in the Valjbone River Valley. South of them the Kosovska Division broke through the Italian defences in the Drin River Valley, but due to the fall of Skopje to the attacks by the German Army, the Vardarska Division was forced to stop its operations in Albania.

There was little further progress for the Yugoslavs on 9 April 1941, because although the Zetska Division continued advancing towards Shkodër and the Komski Odred reached the Drin River, the Kosovska Division had to halt all combat activities on the Albanian Front due to the appearance of German troops in Prizren.

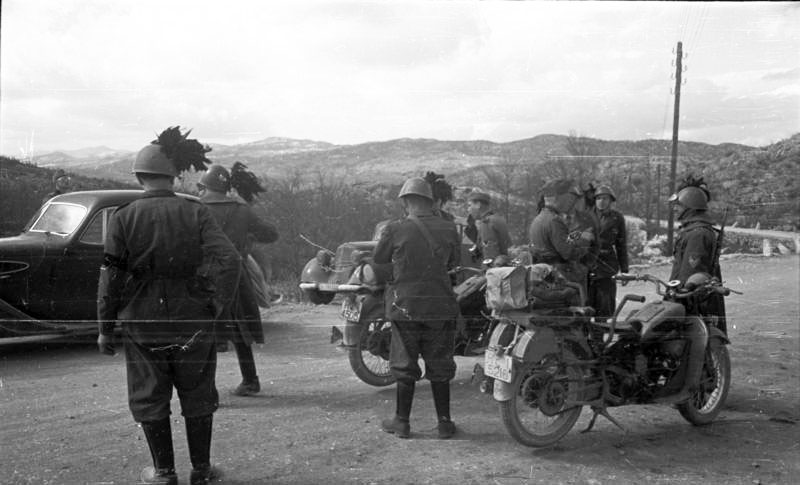
Italian Bersaglieri during the invasion

On 10 April 1941, the Zetska Division was still steadily fighting its way towards Shkodër and had advanced 50 km in some places. These advances had been supported by aircraft of the VVKJ's 66th and 81st Bomber Groups, who attacked airfields and Italian troop concentrations around Shkodër, as well as the port of Durrës.

The Komski Odred and the right column of the Kosovska Division advanced along the right bank of the Drin River towards Shkodër in order to link with Zetska Division, but the central and left column of the Kosovska Division were forced to take a defensive perimeter to hold off the increasing pressure by German troops. The Servizio Informazioni Militare contributed to the eventual failure of the Yugoslav offensive in Albania; Italian code breakers had "broken" Yugoslav codes and penetrated Yugoslav radio traffic, transmitting false orders with the correct code key and thus causing confusion and disruption in the movements of the Yugoslav troops.

Between 11–13 April 1941, with German and Italian troops advancing on its rear areas, the Zetska Division was forced to retreat back to the Pronisat River by the Italian 131st Armored Division "Centauro", where it remained until the end of the campaign on 16 April. The Centauro then advanced to the Yugoslav fleet base of Kotor in Montenegro, also occupying Cetinje and Podgorica.

==== Local uprisings ====
At the local level infighting by Yugoslav citizens started even prior to the arrival of Axis troops. Croats in the 108th Infantry Regiment of the 40th Infantry Division "Slavonska" rebelled on the evening of 7–8 April near Grubišno Polje, taking command of the regiment from its Serb officers. They were subsequently joined by the 40th Auxiliary Regiment and elements of the 42nd Infantry Regiment (also from the "Slavonska" Division). With the deteriorating situation in the area, the Yugoslav 4th Army's headquarters was moved from Bjelovar to Popovača. The rebellious regiments then entered Bjelovar, with the city's mayor Julije Makanec proclaiming an Independent State of Croatia on 8 April. Vladko Maček and ban Ivan Šubašić sent messages to the city urging the regiments to maintain their positions, but this was disobeyed by the rebel military and civil officials who waited for the arrival of the German army.

On 10 April, there were clashes between Ustaša supporters and Yugoslav troops in Mostar, the former taking control of the city. Several VVKJ aircraft were damaged and disabled on Jasenica airfield near Mostar, including several Dornier Do 17Ks and Savoia Marchetti SM-79 K bombers.

On 11 April, domestic Ustaša agents took power in Čapljina. They intercepted Yugoslav troops headed by rail from Mostar to Trebinje and disarmed them. A backup Yugoslav force from Bileća was sent in which retook the town on 14 April, before the arrival of the Germans in the following days.

=== Naval operations ===
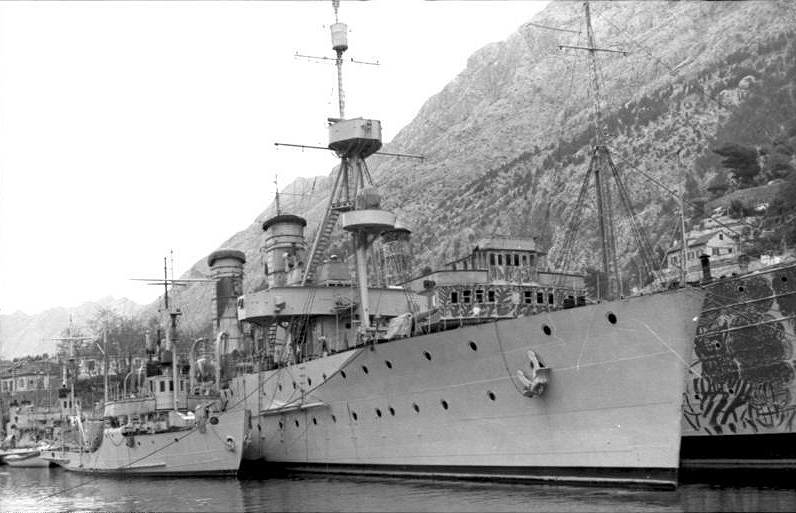
Yugoslav Navy ships captured by the Italian Regia Marina in April 1941. They are, from left, a Malinska-class minelayer, the light cruiser Dalmacija and the submarine depot ship Hvar.

When Germany and Italy attacked Yugoslavia on 6 April 1941, the Yugoslav Royal Navy had available three destroyers, two submarines and 10 MTBs as the most effective units of the fleet. One other destroyer, Ljubljana was in dry-dock at the time of the invasion and she and her anti-aircraft guns were used in defence of the fleet base at Kotor. The remainder of the fleet was useful only for coastal defence and local escort and patrol work.

Kotor was close to the Albanian border and the Italo-Greek front there, but Zara (Zadar), an Italian enclave, was to the north-west of the coast and to prevent a bridgehead being established, the destroyer Beograd, four of the old torpedo boats and 6 MTBs were despatched to Šibenik, 80 km to the south of Zara, in preparation for an attack. The attack was to be coordinated with the 12th "Jadranska" Infantry Division and two "Odred" (combined regiments) of the Yugoslav Army attacking from the Benkovac area, supported by air attacks by the 81st Bomber Group of the VVKJ. The Yugoslav forces launched their attack on 9 April but by 13 April the Italian forces had counter-attacked and were in Benkovac by 14 April. The naval prong to this attack faltered when the destroyer Beograd was damaged by near misses from Italian aircraft off Šibenik when her starboard engine was put out of action, after which she limped to Kotor, escorted by the remainder of the force, for repair. Italian air raids on Kotor badly damaged the minelayer Kobac, which was beached to prevent sinking.

The maritime patrol floatplanes of the Royal Yugoslav Air Force flew reconnaissance and attack missions during the campaign, as well as providing air cover for mine-laying operations off Zara. Their operations included attacks on the Albanian port of Durrës, as well as strikes against Italian re-supply convoys to Albania. On 9 April, one Dornier Do 22K floatplane notably took on an Italian convoy of 12 steamers with an escort of eight destroyers crossing the Adriatic during the day, attacking single-handed in the face of intense AA fire. No Italian ships, however, were sunk by Yugoslav forces; an Italian tanker was claimed to have been damaged by a near miss off the Italian coast near Bari.

The Royal Yugoslav Navy also had at its disposal four large, heavily armed and armoured river monitors in its riverine flotilla. They were used to patrol the Danube, Drava and Sava rivers in the northern parts of Yugoslavia and its border with Hungary. These monitors, Drava, Sava, Morava and Vardar, had been inherited from the Austrian Navy at the end of World War I. All were of around 400–500t with a main armament of two 120 mm guns, two or three 66 mm guns, 120 mm mortars, 40 mm AA guns and machine guns. At the start of the campaign, they had carried out offensive operations by shelling the airfield at Mohács in Hungary on 6 April and again two days later, but had to begin withdrawing towards Novi Sad by 11 April after coming under repeated attack by German dive-bombers.

Early in the morning of 12 April, a squadron of German Ju 87 dive-bombers attacked the Yugoslav monitors on the Danube. Drava, commanded by Aleksandar Berić, was hit by several of them but they were unable to penetrate Drava's 300 mm thick deck armour, until, by chance, one put a bomb straight down the funnel, killing 54 of the 67-man crew. During the attack anti-aircraft gunners on the monitors claimed three dive-bombers shot down. The remaining three monitors were scuttled by their crews later on 12 April as German and Hungarian forces had occupied the bases and the river systems upon which they operated.

=== Romanian involvement ===
While Romania did not take part in the actual invasion of Yugoslavia, it did provide artillery support for the German forces invading from its territory. Operating on orders from the 3rd Section of the Romanian General Staff, Romanian artillery opened fire against Yugoslav barges on the Danube on 6 April. Romanian and German units from the Romanian bank of the Danube repeatedly exchanged fire with Yugoslav forces between 6 and 11 April. The main Romanian force was at Liubcova, consisting of a battery of 120 mm/L10 naval howitzers in a fortified position. Nearby, there was also a section (2 pieces) of 120 mm/L35 naval howitzers as well as a section of 47 mm light naval guns. The Yugoslavs retaliated with their Air Force. Two Bristol Blenheims raided Arad, badly damaging one of the German fighters stationed there before both were shot down. For its contribution, Romania was rewarded with six ex-Yugoslav aircraft captured by the Germans. These machines, delivered free of charge, were however inoperative. The Romanians cannibalized three of them in order to make the other three operational. The three operational aircraft were all Hawker Hurricanes.

== Losses ==
German propaganda footage of the invasion of Yugoslavia and Greece

The losses sustained by the German attack forces were unexpectedly light. During the twelve days of combat the total casualty figures came to 558 men: 151 were listed as killed, 392 as wounded, and 15 as missing in action. During the XLI Panzer Corps drive on Belgrade, for example, the only officer killed in action fell victim to a civilian sniper's bullet. The Luftwaffe lost approximately 60 aircraft shot down over Yugoslavia, costing the lives of at least 70 aircrew. The Italian Army took heavier casualties in northern Albania from the Yugoslav offensive there (Italian casualties on all fronts during the invasion amounted to some 800 killed and 2,500 wounded), whilst the Italian Air Force lost approximately 10 aircraft shot down, with a further 22 damaged. The Hungarian Army suffered some 350 casualties (120 killed, 223 wounded and 13 missing in action) from the shelling by Yugoslav riverine forces of its frontier installations and in its attacks upon the Yugoslav frontier forces in Vojvodina, with one quarter of a Hungarian parachute 'battalion' becoming casualties when a transport aircraft filled with 30 troops went down during an abortive drop on 12 April. The Hungarians also lost five Fiat fighters and one Weiss WM-21 Sólyom reconnaissance aircraft during the fighting.

The Germans took between 254,000 and 345,000 Yugoslav prisoners (excluding a considerable number of ethnic Germans and Hungarians who had been conscripted into the Yugoslav Army and who were quickly released after screening), and the Italians took 30,000 more.

Approximately 1,000 army and several hundred VVKJ personnel (including one mobile-workshop unit of six vehicles) escaped via Greece to Egypt.

In their brief fight, the VVKJ suffered the loss of 49 aircraft to Axis fighters and anti-aircraft fire, with many more damaged beyond repair. These losses cost the lives of 27 fighter pilots and 76 bomber aircrew. 85 more aircraft were destroyed on the ground by air attack, while many others were destroyed or disabled by their own crews or crashed during operations or in evacuation flights.

Despite these losses, more than 70 Yugoslav aircraft escaped to Allied territory, mostly to Greece, but eight Dornier and Savoia Marchetti bombers set course for the USSR, with four making it safely. Several dozen of the escapee aircraft were destroyed in a devastating strafing attack by the Italian air force on Paramitia airfield in Greece, with nine bombers and transports making it to Egypt. More than 300 operational, auxiliary and training aircraft were captured and passed on to the newly created Air Force of the Independent State of Croatia, Finland, Romania and Bulgaria.

According to the provisions of the surrender document, the Italians took possession of most of the Yugoslav Navy (one of its four destroyers, the Ljubljana, had spent the campaign in dry dock). However, in defiance of the said provisions, one destroyer, the Zagreb, was blown up at Kotor by two of its junior officers and one of the British-built submarines and two MTBs escaped to Alexandria in Egypt to continue to serve with the Allied cause. A fourth destroyer was captured while under construction in the Kotor shipyard, the Split, but the Regia Marina was not able to finish her before the armistice in 1943. Eventually, she was recovered after the war by the Yugoslavs and completed under the original name. Ten Yugoslav Navy maritime patrol floatplanes escaped to Greece, with nine making it to Egypt, where they formed a squadron under RAF command.

== Armistice and surrender ==
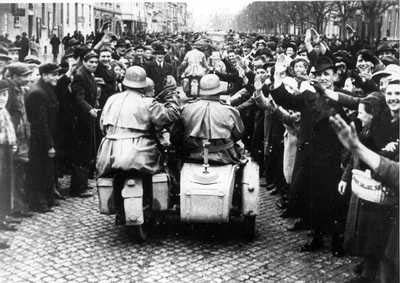
14th Panzer Division entering Zagreb without resistance, to cheering crowds

The Axis victory was swift. As early as 14 April the Yugoslav high command had decided to seek an armistice and authorised the army and army group commanders to negotiate local ceasefires. That day the commanders of the 2nd and 5th Armies asked the Germans for terms but were rejected. Only unconditional surrender could form the basis for negotiations they were told. That evening, the high command sent an emissary to the headquarters of the 1st Panzer Group to ask for armistice, and in response General von Kleist sent the commander of the 2nd Army, von Weichs, to Belgrade to negotiate terms. He arrived on the afternoon of 15 April and drew up an armistice based on unconditional surrender.

On 16 April, a Yugoslav delegate arrived in Belgrade, but as he did not have authority to sign the document, he was given a draft of the agreement, and an aircraft was placed at his disposal to bring in authorised representatives of the government. Finally, on 17 April, after only eleven days of fighting, the pre-coup Foreign Minister Aleksandar Cincar-Marković and General Radivoje Janković signed the armistice and unconditionally surrendered all Yugoslav troops. It came into effect the following day (18 April) at noon. At the signing, the Hungarians and Bulgarians were represented by liaison officers, but they did not sign the document because their countries were not officially at war with Yugoslavia. The Italian representative, Colonel Luigi Buonofati, signed the document after noting that "the same terms are valid for the Italian army".

Some scholars have proposed a number of theories for the Royal Yugoslav Army's sudden collapse, including poor training and equipment, generals eager to secure a quick cessation of hostilities, and a sizeable Croatian, Slovenian and German fifth column. Others state that the fifth column had little effect on the ultimate outcome of the invasion. According to Tomasevich, the insistence of the Yugoslav Army on defending all the borders assured its failure from the start. Historian Aleksa Djilas states that Croatian desertion is overplayed, as many Croatian units actively fought the Germans and most Croatian officers "remained loyal until 10 April when the NDH was proclaimed" which brought an end to Yugoslavia and in turn, their loyalty to the government. He adds that the army simply reflected the weak Yugoslav political system and the main reasons for the defeat were the lack of leadership, the army's subpar equipment and outdated tactical and strategical techniques. Many Serbian nationalists blamed the loss on "fifth columnist" Croats who stood to gain from Italian and German rule, ignoring the primary failure of the Yugoslav Army and its almost entirely Serbian leadership. Many Croatian nationalists blamed Belgrade politicians and the inadequacy of the Serbian-dominated army.

== Aftermath ==
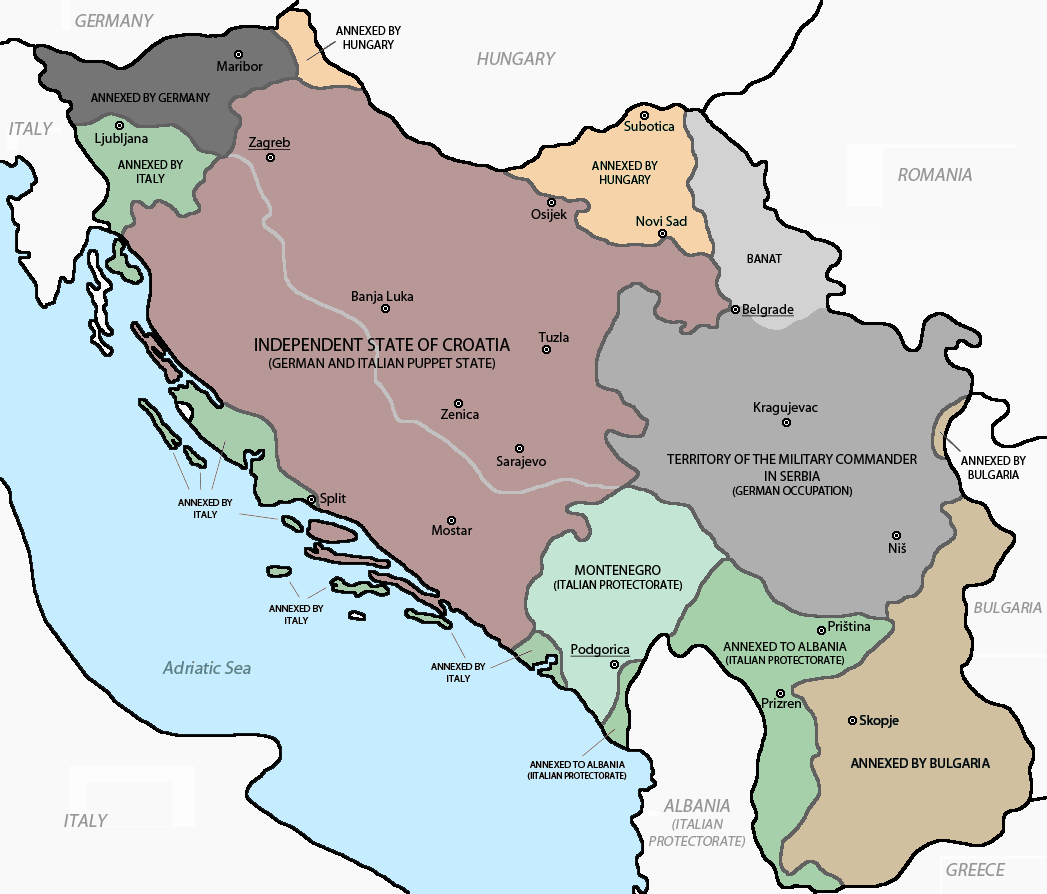
Occupation and partition of Yugoslavia 1941

After the surrender, Yugoslavia was subsequently divided amongst Germany, Hungary, Italy and Bulgaria. Germany took control of most of Serbia. While Ante Pavelić, leader of the fascist Ustaše, proclaimed the establishment of the NDH before the invasion was even over, Croatia was actually under the joint control of Germany and Italy.

When the Yugoslav Army officially surrendered to the Axis forces on 18 April 1941, Royal Yugoslav Army Colonel Draža Mihailović immediately began to organize a resistance to the occupying force in the mountains of Serbia and Eastern Bosnia. Mihailović was made General of this new guerrilla version of the army and Minister for War by King Peter II and his Yugoslav government-in-exile in Britain. Though Mihailović tried to insist that the guerrilla forces under his command, and numbering up to 100,000 active soldiers, continue to be referred to as the "Royal Yugoslav Army", American and British intelligence and media reportage consistently referred to them as "Chetniks". This led to confusion, since both quisling Yugoslav guerrilla forces under General Milan Nedić and Royalist guerrilla forces not under Mihailović's command were also referred to as "Chetniks". Once the Soviets fully entered the war on the side of the Allies on 22 June 1941, the Yugoslav Partisans under Josip Tito also began to fight the Axis powers, and from then on there was continuous resistance to the occupying armies in Yugoslavia until the end of the war. While in the beginning both Yugoslav Partisans and the Chetniks engaged in resistance, the Partisans became the main resistance force after, following Churchill's lead, at the Tehran Conference on 28 November – 1 December 1943, British and American governments withdrew all allegiance and support from Mihailović's Royal Yugoslav Army Chetniks, and gave all further assistance to the Communist Partisans who waged a continuous civil war against Mihailović's forces. In the end, devoid of all outside assistance, Mihailović's Royal Yugoslav Army was overcome in Serbia by a combination of well-armed, -supported, and -supplied Partisans and the invading Soviets.

== See also ==
- 1st Army Group (Kingdom of Yugoslavia)
- List of German military equipment of World War II
- List of Italian Army equipment in World War II
- List of Yugoslav military equipment of World War II
- Yugoslavia and the Allies

Region	until 1918	1918– 1929	1929– 1945	1941– 1945	1945– 1946	1946– 1963	1963– 1992	1992– 2003	2003– 2006	2006– 2008	since 2008
Slovenia	Part of Austria-Hungary including the Bay of Kotor See also: Kingdom of Croatia-Slavonia (1868–1918) Kingdom of Dalmatia (1815–1918) Condominium of Bosnia and Herzegovina (1878–1918)	State of Slovenes, Croats and Serbs (1918) Kingdom of Serbs, Croats and Slovenes (1918–1929) Kingdom of Yugoslavia (1929–1943) See also: Republic of Prekmurje (1919) Banat, Bačka and Baranja (1918–1919) Free State of Fiume (1920–1924) (1924–1945) Italian province of Zadar (1920–1947)		Annexed by Italy, Germany, and Hungary^{a}	Democratic Federal Yugoslavia (1943–1945) Federal People's Republic of Yugoslavia (1945–1963) Socialist Federal Republic of Yugoslavia (1963–1992) Consisted of the Socialist Republics of: Slovenia (1945–1991); Croatia (1945–1991); Bosnia and Herzegovina (1945–1992) Serbia (1945–1992) (included the autonomous provinces of Vojvodina and Kosovo) Montenegro (1945–1992); Macedonia (1945–1991) See also: Free Territory of Trieste (1947–1954)^{h}			Republic of Slovenia; Ten-Day War			
Dalmatia	Part of Austria-Hungary including the Bay of Kotor See also: Kingdom of Croatia-Slavonia (1868–1918) Kingdom of Dalmatia (1815–1918) Condominium of Bosnia and Herzegovina (1878–1918)	State of Slovenes, Croats and Serbs (1918) Kingdom of Serbs, Croats and Slovenes (1918–1929) Kingdom of Yugoslavia (1929–1943) See also: Republic of Prekmurje (1919) Banat, Bačka and Baranja (1918–1919) Free State of Fiume (1920–1924) (1924–1945) Italian province of Zadar (1920–1947)		Independent State of Croatia (1941–1945) Puppet state of Germany. Parts annexed by Italy. Međimurje and Baranja annexed by Hungary.	Democratic Federal Yugoslavia (1943–1945) Federal People's Republic of Yugoslavia (1945–1963) Socialist Federal Republic of Yugoslavia (1963–1992) Consisted of the Socialist Republics of: Slovenia (1945–1991); Croatia (1945–1991); Bosnia and Herzegovina (1945–1992) Serbia (1945–1992) (included the autonomous provinces of Vojvodina and Kosovo) Montenegro (1945–1992); Macedonia (1945–1991) See also: Free Territory of Trieste (1947–1954)^{h}			Republic of Croatia^{b} Croatian War of Independence			
Slavonia	Part of Austria-Hungary including the Bay of Kotor See also: Kingdom of Croatia-Slavonia (1868–1918) Kingdom of Dalmatia (1815–1918) Condominium of Bosnia and Herzegovina (1878–1918)	State of Slovenes, Croats and Serbs (1918) Kingdom of Serbs, Croats and Slovenes (1918–1929) Kingdom of Yugoslavia (1929–1943) See also: Republic of Prekmurje (1919) Banat, Bačka and Baranja (1918–1919) Free State of Fiume (1920–1924) (1924–1945) Italian province of Zadar (1920–1947)		Independent State of Croatia (1941–1945) Puppet state of Germany. Parts annexed by Italy. Međimurje and Baranja annexed by Hungary.	Democratic Federal Yugoslavia (1943–1945) Federal People's Republic of Yugoslavia (1945–1963) Socialist Federal Republic of Yugoslavia (1963–1992) Consisted of the Socialist Republics of: Slovenia (1945–1991); Croatia (1945–1991); Bosnia and Herzegovina (1945–1992) Serbia (1945–1992) (included the autonomous provinces of Vojvodina and Kosovo) Montenegro (1945–1992); Macedonia (1945–1991) See also: Free Territory of Trieste (1947–1954)^{h}			Republic of Croatia^{b} Croatian War of Independence			
Croatia	Part of Austria-Hungary including the Bay of Kotor See also: Kingdom of Croatia-Slavonia (1868–1918) Kingdom of Dalmatia (1815–1918) Condominium of Bosnia and Herzegovina (1878–1918)	State of Slovenes, Croats and Serbs (1918) Kingdom of Serbs, Croats and Slovenes (1918–1929) Kingdom of Yugoslavia (1929–1943) See also: Republic of Prekmurje (1919) Banat, Bačka and Baranja (1918–1919) Free State of Fiume (1920–1924) (1924–1945) Italian province of Zadar (1920–1947)		Independent State of Croatia (1941–1945) Puppet state of Germany. Parts annexed by Italy. Međimurje and Baranja annexed by Hungary.	Democratic Federal Yugoslavia (1943–1945) Federal People's Republic of Yugoslavia (1945–1963) Socialist Federal Republic of Yugoslavia (1963–1992) Consisted of the Socialist Republics of: Slovenia (1945–1991); Croatia (1945–1991); Bosnia and Herzegovina (1945–1992) Serbia (1945–1992) (included the autonomous provinces of Vojvodina and Kosovo) Montenegro (1945–1992); Macedonia (1945–1991) See also: Free Territory of Trieste (1947–1954)^{h}			Republic of Croatia^{b} Croatian War of Independence			
Bosnia	Part of Austria-Hungary including the Bay of Kotor See also: Kingdom of Croatia-Slavonia (1868–1918) Kingdom of Dalmatia (1815–1918) Condominium of Bosnia and Herzegovina (1878–1918)	State of Slovenes, Croats and Serbs (1918) Kingdom of Serbs, Croats and Slovenes (1918–1929) Kingdom of Yugoslavia (1929–1943) See also: Republic of Prekmurje (1919) Banat, Bačka and Baranja (1918–1919) Free State of Fiume (1920–1924) (1924–1945) Italian province of Zadar (1920–1947)		Independent State of Croatia (1941–1945) Puppet state of Germany. Parts annexed by Italy. Međimurje and Baranja annexed by Hungary.	Democratic Federal Yugoslavia (1943–1945) Federal People's Republic of Yugoslavia (1945–1963) Socialist Federal Republic of Yugoslavia (1963–1992) Consisted of the Socialist Republics of: Slovenia (1945–1991); Croatia (1945–1991); Bosnia and Herzegovina (1945–1992) Serbia (1945–1992) (included the autonomous provinces of Vojvodina and Kosovo) Montenegro (1945–1992); Macedonia (1945–1991) See also: Free Territory of Trieste (1947–1954)^{h}			Bosnia and Herzegovina^{c} Bosnian War Consists of the Federation of Bosnia and Herzegovina (since 1995), Republika Srpska (since 1995), and Brčko District (since 2000).			
Herzegovina	Part of Austria-Hungary including the Bay of Kotor See also: Kingdom of Croatia-Slavonia (1868–1918) Kingdom of Dalmatia (1815–1918) Condominium of Bosnia and Herzegovina (1878–1918)	State of Slovenes, Croats and Serbs (1918) Kingdom of Serbs, Croats and Slovenes (1918–1929) Kingdom of Yugoslavia (1929–1943) See also: Republic of Prekmurje (1919) Banat, Bačka and Baranja (1918–1919) Free State of Fiume (1920–1924) (1924–1945) Italian province of Zadar (1920–1947)		Independent State of Croatia (1941–1945) Puppet state of Germany. Parts annexed by Italy. Međimurje and Baranja annexed by Hungary.	Democratic Federal Yugoslavia (1943–1945) Federal People's Republic of Yugoslavia (1945–1963) Socialist Federal Republic of Yugoslavia (1963–1992) Consisted of the Socialist Republics of: Slovenia (1945–1991); Croatia (1945–1991); Bosnia and Herzegovina (1945–1992) Serbia (1945–1992) (included the autonomous provinces of Vojvodina and Kosovo) Montenegro (1945–1992); Macedonia (1945–1991) See also: Free Territory of Trieste (1947–1954)^{h}			Bosnia and Herzegovina^{c} Bosnian War Consists of the Federation of Bosnia and Herzegovina (since 1995), Republika Srpska (since 1995), and Brčko District (since 2000).			
Vojvodina	Part of the Délvidék region of Hungary	State of Slovenes, Croats and Serbs (1918) Kingdom of Serbs, Croats and Slovenes (1918–1929) Kingdom of Yugoslavia (1929–1943) See also: Republic of Prekmurje (1919) Banat, Bačka and Baranja (1918–1919) Free State of Fiume (1920–1924) (1924–1945) Italian province of Zadar (1920–1947)		Autonomous Banat^{d} (part of the German; Territory of the Military Commander in Serbia)	Democratic Federal Yugoslavia (1943–1945) Federal People's Republic of Yugoslavia (1945–1963) Socialist Federal Republic of Yugoslavia (1963–1992) Consisted of the Socialist Republics of: Slovenia (1945–1991); Croatia (1945–1991); Bosnia and Herzegovina (1945–1992) Serbia (1945–1992) (included the autonomous provinces of Vojvodina and Kosovo) Montenegro (1945–1992); Macedonia (1945–1991) See also: Free Territory of Trieste (1947–1954)^{h}			Federal Republic of Yugoslavia Consisted of the Republic of Serbia (1992–2006) and Republic of Montenegro (1992–2006) Included Kosovo and Metohija, under UN administration, without control since 1999	State Union of Serbia and Montenegro Included Kosovo, under UN administration	Republic of Serbia Included the autonomous provinces of Vojvodina and Kosovo and Metohija under UN administration	Republic of Serbia Includes the autonomous province of Vojvodina; Kosovo claim
Central Serbia	Kingdom of Serbia (1882–1918)	State of Slovenes, Croats and Serbs (1918) Kingdom of Serbs, Croats and Slovenes (1918–1929) Kingdom of Yugoslavia (1929–1943) See also: Republic of Prekmurje (1919) Banat, Bačka and Baranja (1918–1919) Free State of Fiume (1920–1924) (1924–1945) Italian province of Zadar (1920–1947)		Territory of the Military Commander in Serbia (1941–1944) ^{e}	Democratic Federal Yugoslavia (1943–1945) Federal People's Republic of Yugoslavia (1945–1963) Socialist Federal Republic of Yugoslavia (1963–1992) Consisted of the Socialist Republics of: Slovenia (1945–1991); Croatia (1945–1991); Bosnia and Herzegovina (1945–1992) Serbia (1945–1992) (included the autonomous provinces of Vojvodina and Kosovo) Montenegro (1945–1992); Macedonia (1945–1991) See also: Free Territory of Trieste (1947–1954)^{h}			Federal Republic of Yugoslavia Consisted of the Republic of Serbia (1992–2006) and Republic of Montenegro (1992–2006) Included Kosovo and Metohija, under UN administration, without control since 1999	State Union of Serbia and Montenegro Included Kosovo, under UN administration	Republic of Serbia Included the autonomous provinces of Vojvodina and Kosovo and Metohija under UN administration	Republic of Serbia Includes the autonomous province of Vojvodina; Kosovo claim
Kosovo	Part of the Kingdom of Serbia (1912–1918)	State of Slovenes, Croats and Serbs (1918) Kingdom of Serbs, Croats and Slovenes (1918–1929) Kingdom of Yugoslavia (1929–1943) See also: Republic of Prekmurje (1919) Banat, Bačka and Baranja (1918–1919) Free State of Fiume (1920–1924) (1924–1945) Italian province of Zadar (1920–1947)		Mostly annexed by Italian Albania (1941–1944) along with western Macedonia and south-eastern Montenegro	Democratic Federal Yugoslavia (1943–1945) Federal People's Republic of Yugoslavia (1945–1963) Socialist Federal Republic of Yugoslavia (1963–1992) Consisted of the Socialist Republics of: Slovenia (1945–1991); Croatia (1945–1991); Bosnia and Herzegovina (1945–1992) Serbia (1945–1992) (included the autonomous provinces of Vojvodina and Kosovo) Montenegro (1945–1992); Macedonia (1945–1991) See also: Free Territory of Trieste (1947–1954)^{h}			Federal Republic of Yugoslavia Consisted of the Republic of Serbia (1992–2006) and Republic of Montenegro (1992–2006) Included Kosovo and Metohija, under UN administration, without control since 1999	State Union of Serbia and Montenegro Included Kosovo, under UN administration	Republic of Serbia Included the autonomous provinces of Vojvodina and Kosovo and Metohija under UN administration	Republic of Kosovo
Metohija	Kingdom of Montenegro (1910–1918) Metohija controlled by Austria-Hungary 1915–1918	State of Slovenes, Croats and Serbs (1918) Kingdom of Serbs, Croats and Slovenes (1918–1929) Kingdom of Yugoslavia (1929–1943) See also: Republic of Prekmurje (1919) Banat, Bačka and Baranja (1918–1919) Free State of Fiume (1920–1924) (1924–1945) Italian province of Zadar (1920–1947)		Mostly annexed by Italian Albania (1941–1944) along with western Macedonia and south-eastern Montenegro	Democratic Federal Yugoslavia (1943–1945) Federal People's Republic of Yugoslavia (1945–1963) Socialist Federal Republic of Yugoslavia (1963–1992) Consisted of the Socialist Republics of: Slovenia (1945–1991); Croatia (1945–1991); Bosnia and Herzegovina (1945–1992) Serbia (1945–1992) (included the autonomous provinces of Vojvodina and Kosovo) Montenegro (1945–1992); Macedonia (1945–1991) See also: Free Territory of Trieste (1947–1954)^{h}			Federal Republic of Yugoslavia Consisted of the Republic of Serbia (1992–2006) and Republic of Montenegro (1992–2006) Included Kosovo and Metohija, under UN administration, without control since 1999	State Union of Serbia and Montenegro Included Kosovo, under UN administration	Republic of Serbia Included the autonomous provinces of Vojvodina and Kosovo and Metohija under UN administration	Republic of Kosovo
Montenegro and Brda	Kingdom of Montenegro (1910–1918) Metohija controlled by Austria-Hungary 1915–1918	State of Slovenes, Croats and Serbs (1918) Kingdom of Serbs, Croats and Slovenes (1918–1929) Kingdom of Yugoslavia (1929–1943) See also: Republic of Prekmurje (1919) Banat, Bačka and Baranja (1918–1919) Free State of Fiume (1920–1924) (1924–1945) Italian province of Zadar (1920–1947)		Protectorate of Montenegro^{f} (1941–1944)	Democratic Federal Yugoslavia (1943–1945) Federal People's Republic of Yugoslavia (1945–1963) Socialist Federal Republic of Yugoslavia (1963–1992) Consisted of the Socialist Republics of: Slovenia (1945–1991); Croatia (1945–1991); Bosnia and Herzegovina (1945–1992) Serbia (1945–1992) (included the autonomous provinces of Vojvodina and Kosovo) Montenegro (1945–1992); Macedonia (1945–1991) See also: Free Territory of Trieste (1947–1954)^{h}			Federal Republic of Yugoslavia Consisted of the Republic of Serbia (1992–2006) and Republic of Montenegro (1992–2006) Included Kosovo and Metohija, under UN administration, without control since 1999	State Union of Serbia and Montenegro Included Kosovo, under UN administration	Montenegro	
Vardar Macedonia	Part of the Kingdom of Serbia (1912–1918)	State of Slovenes, Croats and Serbs (1918) Kingdom of Serbs, Croats and Slovenes (1918–1929) Kingdom of Yugoslavia (1929–1943) See also: Republic of Prekmurje (1919) Banat, Bačka and Baranja (1918–1919) Free State of Fiume (1920–1924) (1924–1945) Italian province of Zadar (1920–1947)		Annexed by the Kingdom of Bulgaria (1941–1944)	Democratic Federal Yugoslavia (1943–1945) Federal People's Republic of Yugoslavia (1945–1963) Socialist Federal Republic of Yugoslavia (1963–1992) Consisted of the Socialist Republics of: Slovenia (1945–1991); Croatia (1945–1991); Bosnia and Herzegovina (1945–1992) Serbia (1945–1992) (included the autonomous provinces of Vojvodina and Kosovo) Montenegro (1945–1992); Macedonia (1945–1991) See also: Free Territory of Trieste (1947–1954)^{h}			Republic of North Macedonia^{g}			
^{a} Prekmurje annexed by Hungary.; ^{b} See also: SAO Kninska Krajina (1990) → SAO Krajina (1990–1991); and SAO Eastern Slavonia, Baranja and Western Syrmia (1990–1991), SAO Western Slavonia (1990–1991) and the Republic of Serbian Krajina (1990–1995), all replaced by the UN Transitional Administration for Eastern Slavonia, Baranja and Western Sirmium (1996–1998).; ^{c} See also: Republic of Bosnia and Herzegovina; Croatian Republic of Herzeg-Bosnia; and the Serbian Autonomous Oblasts (SAOs) of Bosanska Krajina, North-East Bosnia, Romanija and Herzegovina (1991–1992), which all combined to form the Serbian Republic of Bosnia and Herzegovina (1992–1995).; ^{d} Bačka was reannexed by Hungary (1941–1944), while Syrmia was annexed by the Independent State of Croatia (1941–1944).; ^{e} Including North Kosovo. See also: Republic of Užice.; ^{f} Annexed by Italy (1941–1943) and Germany (1943–1944). Smaller part annexed by the Independent State of Croatia (1941–1944).; ^{g} North Macedonia's official and constitutional name was the Republic of Macedonia until 2019. It was known in the United Nations as the former Yugoslav Republic of Macedonia because of a naming dispute with Greece.; ^{h} Free Territory was established in 1947. Its administration was divided into two areas (Zone A) and (Zone B). Free Territory was de facto taken over by Italy and SFRY in 1954.
