= Führer Directive No. 25 =

1941 directive of Adolf Hitler ordering German attack on Yugoslavia and Greece

- First page of Führer Directive No. 25
- Original title: Weisung Nr. 25
- Created: 27 March 1941; 85 years ago
- Location: Originally: Führer Headquarters Presently: Various; one copy: National Museum of Serbia (Belgrade, Republic of Serbia)
- Signatories: Adolf Hitler
- Media type: Paper
- Purpose: Führer Directive ordering German intervention against Yugoslavia and Greece in the Balkans campaign of World War II

Führer Directive No. 25 (German: Weisung Nr. 25) was a March 1941 directive issued by German dictator Adolf Hitler during World War II. It ordered German intervention against Yugoslavia and Greece in the Balkans campaign, in particular focusing on the invasion and dismemberment of Yugoslavia.

== Background ==
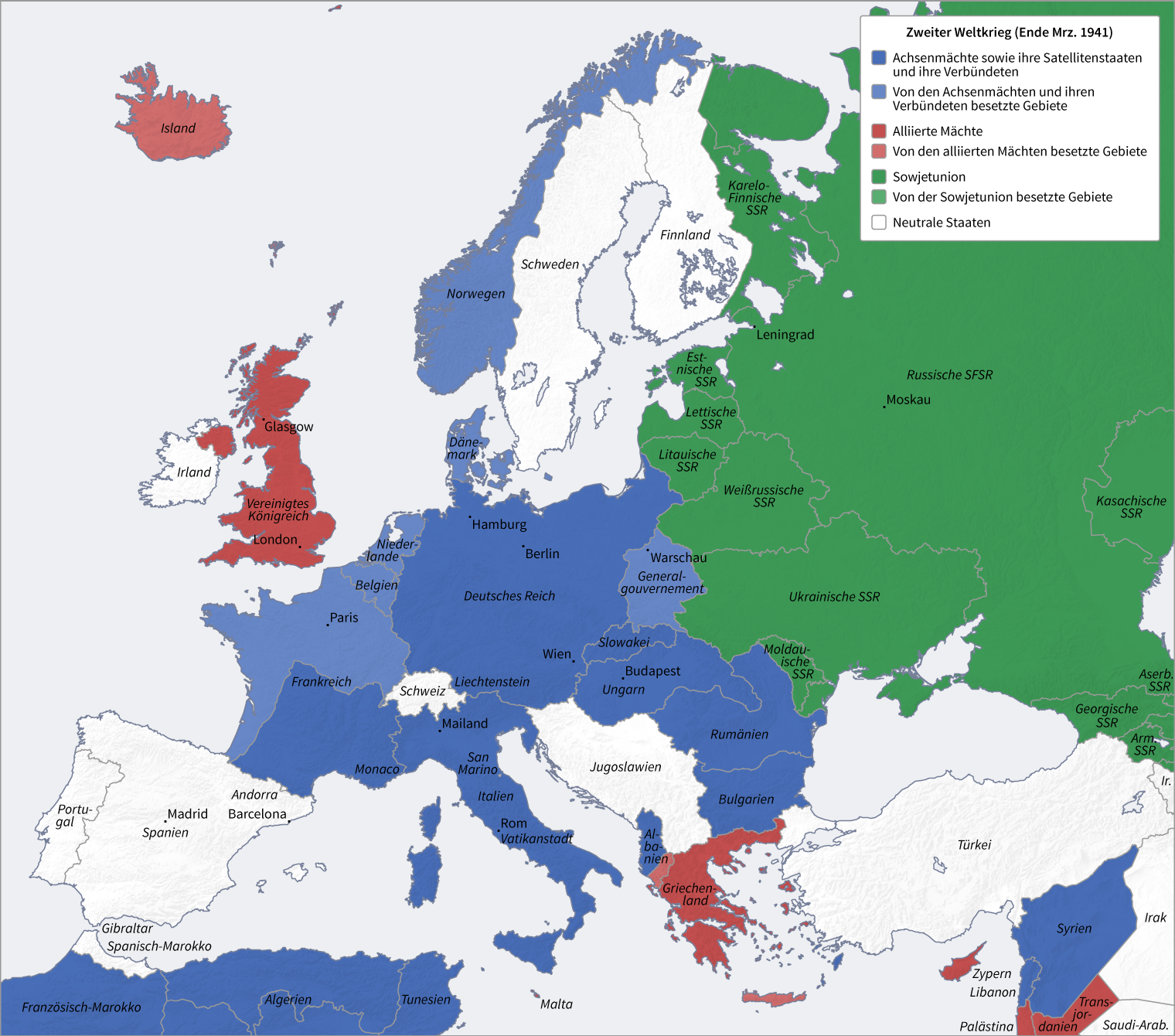
Political map of Europe at the end of March 1941 (in German).

In October 1940, Fascist Italy had attacked the Kingdom of Greece only to be forced back into Italian-occupied Albania. German dictator Adolf Hitler recognised the need to go to the aid of his ally, Italian dictator Benito Mussolini. Hitler did this not only to restore diminished Axis prestige, but also to prevent Britain from bombing the Romanian Ploiești oilfields from which Nazi Germany obtained most of its oil.

In 1940 and early 1941, Hungary, Romania, and Bulgaria all agreed to adhere to the Tripartite Pact and thus join the Axis. Hitler then pressured Yugoslavia to join as well. The Regent, Prince Paul, yielded to this pressure, and declared Yugoslavia's accession to the Pact on 25 March 1941. This move was highly unpopular with the Serb-dominated officer corps of the military, various Serbian organizations, a large part of the Serbian population as well as liberals and Communists. Military officers (predominantly Serbs) executed a coup d'état on 27 March 1941, forced the Regent to resign, and declared 17-year-old King Peter II to be of age.

On the same day as the coup in Yugoslavia, Hitler issued Führer Directive 25, which called for Yugoslavia to be treated as a hostile state. Hitler took the coup as a personal insult, and was so angered that he was determined, in his words, "to destroy Yugoslavia militarily and as a state" (Jugoslawien militärisch und als Staatsgebilde zu zerschlagen) and to do so "with pitiless harshness" and "without waiting for possible declarations of loyalty of the new government".

== Full text ==
Führer and Supreme Commander of the Armed Forces.
Führer Headquarters. 27 March 1941. 13 copies

1. The military coup in Yugoslavia changed the political situation in the Balkans. Yugoslavia should be considered an enemy even if it soon makes a statement of loyalty, so it should be destroyed as soon as possible.
2. My intention is to invade Yugoslavia with a concentric operation from the area of Fiume–Graz, on the one hand, and from the area around Sofia, on the other hand, in the general direction towards Belgrade, and to destroy its army, and to separate its southernmost part from its territory and take it into my hands as a base for extending the German-Italian offensive against Greece. For military and economic reasons, it is important to establish traffic on the Danube and seize the copper mines in Bor. We will try to get Hungary and Bulgaria to participate in the operations, leaving them the possibility of returning Bačka and Macedonia. Political promises to Croatia will increase internal political tension in Yugoslavia.
3. In particular, I order the following:

a) As soon as sufficient forces are gathered and weather conditions permit, the Luftwaffe will destroy the field facilities (military airfields) of the Yugoslav air force, as well as Belgrade, (Note: Hitler ordered the general destruction of Belgrade, but at the last minute Generaloberst Alexander Löhr, the commander of Luftflotte IV, replaced these general directions with specific military objectives within the city. According to post-war testimony of former Generalfeldmarschall Ewald von Kleist at his trial in Yugoslavia, the bombing of Belgrade "had a primarily political-terrorist character and had nothing to do with the war. That air bombing was a matter of Hitler’s vanity, and his personal revenge.") with round-the-clock air attacks.
b) The Operation Marita will start at the same time if possible, not earlier, for now with the limited goal of occupying the Thessaloniki basin and the Edessa plateau; The XVIII Army Corps can advance through Yugoslav territory. Use favorable opportunities to prevent the planned opening of the front between Mt. Olympus and the highlands of Edessa.
c) For the attack, which will follow from the area around Sofia in the northwest direction and from the area of Kyustendil–Gorna Dzhumaya in the west direction, all available forces in Bulgaria and Romania can be used, with the provision that, in addition to the anti-aircraft forces, forces in the strength of about one division will remain as security for the oil-bearing areas of Romania. For the time being, leave security on the Turkish border to the Bulgarians. A German unit, most likely a panzer division, will be prepared in their rear as support.
d) An attack made in the general direction from Graz to the southeast should be carried out as soon as the necessary forces are gathered. The decision on whether to cross Hungarian territory for the purpose of opening the border is left to the Army (Heer). Immediately strengthen security on the Yugoslav border. Likewise, as on the Bulgarian border, important facilities can be captured even before the start of the general attack, simultaneously with the air attack on Belgrade.
e) The Luftwaffe will support the operations of the 12th Army with two attack groups, as well as the strike groups they will form in the area around Graz. For this purpose, they will direct the focus of action according to the temporal development of operations of the Heer. Hungarian air bases can also be used for development and attack. Investigate whether the 10th Air Corps should be used for action from Italian territory. However, the protective escort of transport to Africa must be guaranteed. Continue with the preparations for the conquest of the island of Lemnos, but I will personally issue the order for execution. Sufficient anti-aircraft defense of Graz, Klagenfurt, Villach and Leoben, as well as Vienna, should be ensured.

4. The Supreme Command of the Armed Forces will first conclude agreements in principle with Italy. The Heer will provide a headquarters for liaison with the Italian 2nd Army and the Hungarians. The Luftwaffe is authorized to agree on the delimitation of the operational airspace in relation to the Italian and Hungarian air forces with the commanders-in-chief of the countries in question. The supply of Hungarian air bases can start immediately.
5. The commanders-in-chief will report to me through the Supreme Command of the Armed Forces on the intended conduct of operations and on issues related thereto.

signed: Adolf Hitler

== Strategic consequences ==
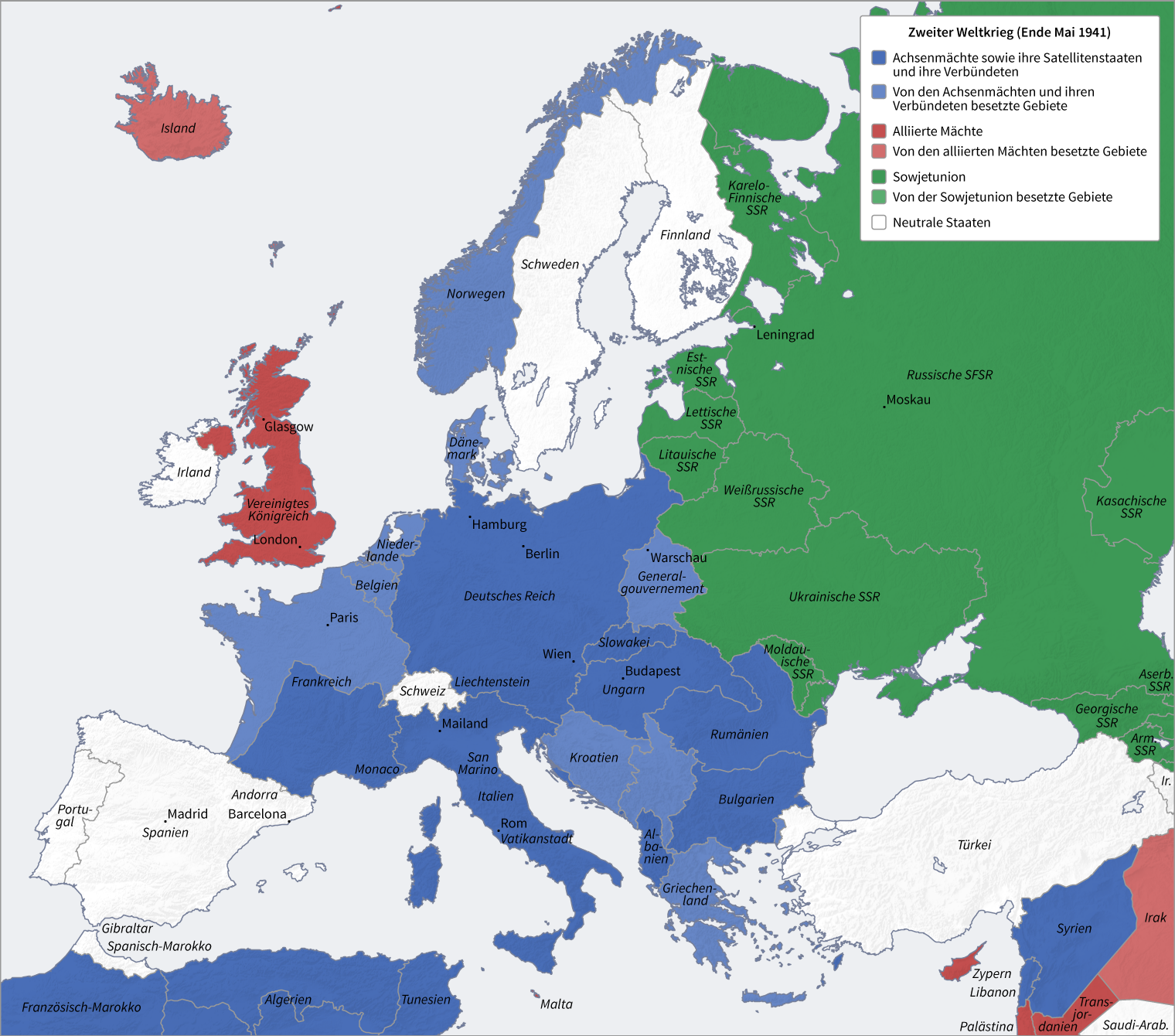
Political map of Europe at the end of May 1941 (in German).

The German-led Axis powers launched simultaneous invasions of both Yugoslavia and Greece, commencing on 6 April 1941; both nations were forced to surrender within the month, and were subsequently occupied and partitioned among the Axis members and their newly-created puppet states. (Note: The most important and notorious of these puppet states was the Independent State of Croatia (Croatian: Nezavisna Država Hrvatska; NDH), ruled by the fascist Ustaše movement. From 1941 to 1945, the Ustaše regime persecuted and murdered around 300,000 Serbs, along with at least 30,000 Jews and Roma; hundreds of thousands of Serbs were also expelled and another 200,000–300,000 were forced to convert to Catholicism.) The invasion of Yugoslavia was initiated with the heavy German bombing of the capital Belgrade, which devastated the city and killed thousands of civilians. (Note: The devastation included the building of the National Library of Serbia (located in the district of Kosančićev Venac), which was bombed and gutted by fire. Hundreds of thousands of rare books, maps, and medieval manuscripts were destroyed. The library was bombed on the order of Hitler himself.) (Note: The sources on civilian casualties vary widely from 1,500 to 17,000 killed.) The airborne invasion of the Greek island of Crete at the end of May completed the German conquest of the Balkans.

With their victory on Crete the Germans had secured their southern flank and turned their attention towards the Soviet Union. The reason most commonly cited for the postponement of Operation Barbarossa from the initially planned date of 15 May to the actual invasion date of 22 June 1941 (a 38-day delay) is the unforeseen contingency of invading Yugoslavia and Greece from April to June 1941.

== Legacy ==
In November 2023, the Republic of Serbia acquired one of the original copies of Directive No. 25 at an auction in the United States. The document is held by the Serbian government since January 2024, and has been displayed in the National Museum of Serbia in Belgrade. This acquisition underscores the directive's historical significance and its impact on Serbian national consciousness.

== Gallery ==
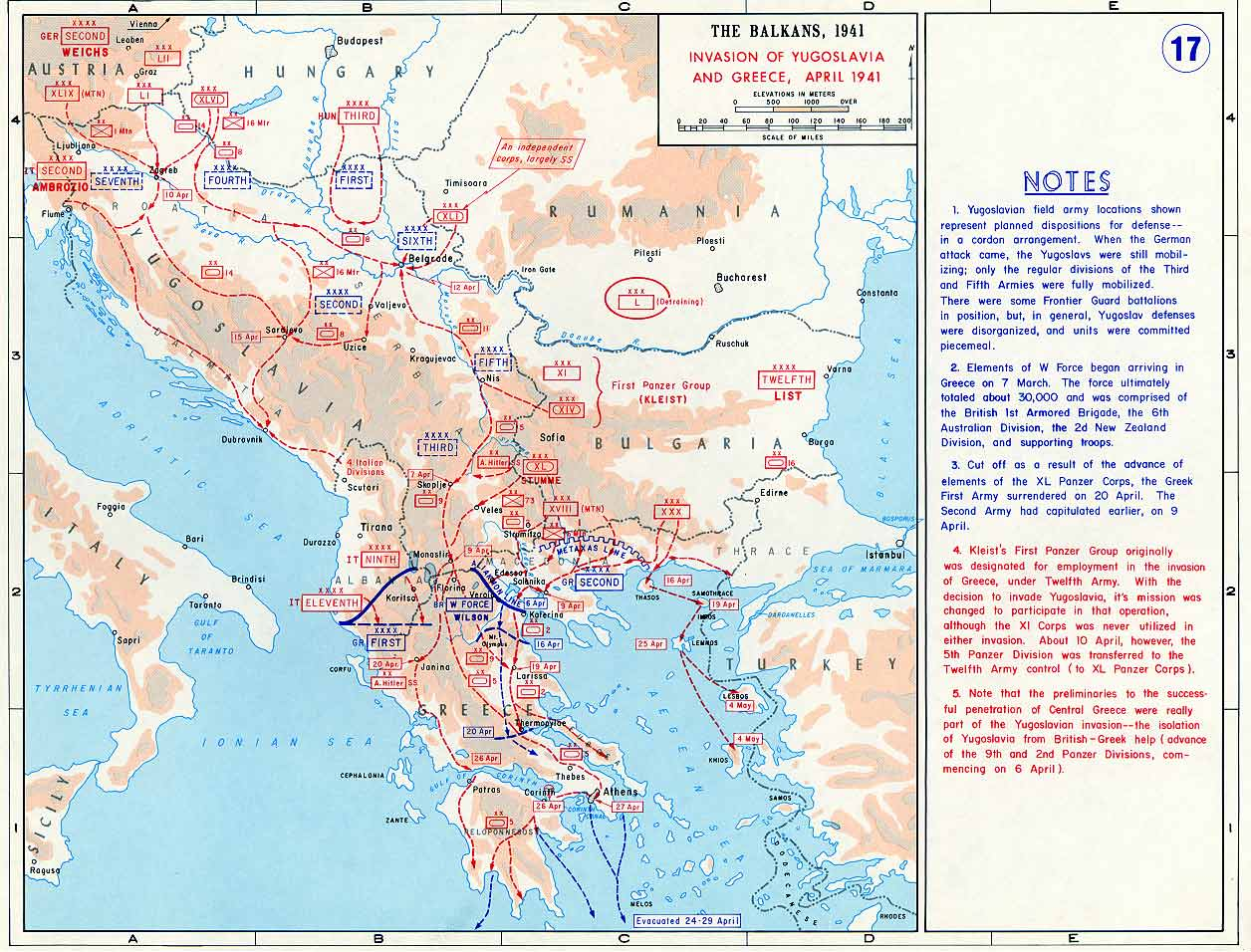
The movements of the Axis forces in Yugoslavia and Greece.

The main lines of the German plan of attack against Yugoslavia (in Spanish).

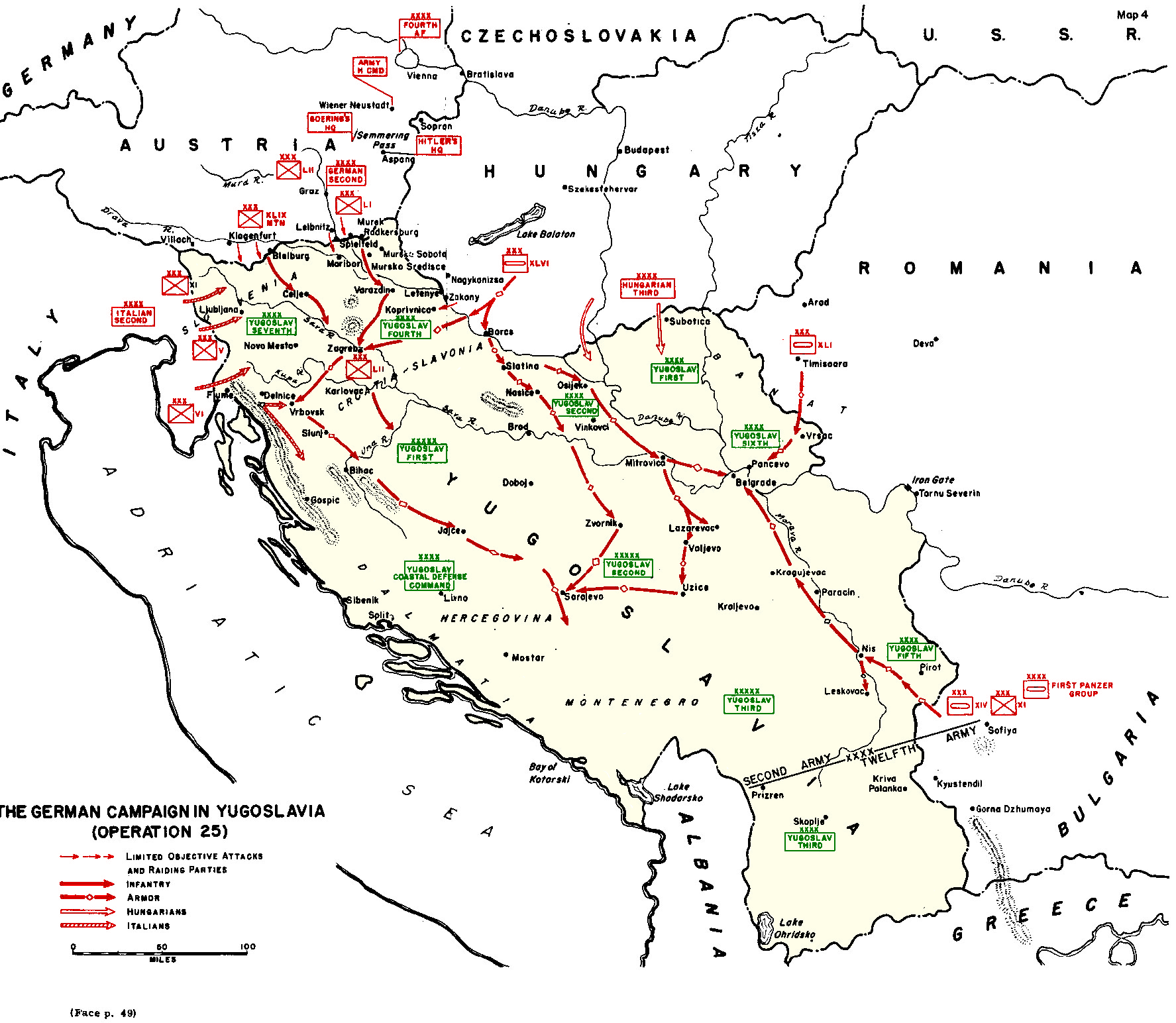
The Axis invasion of Yugoslavia.

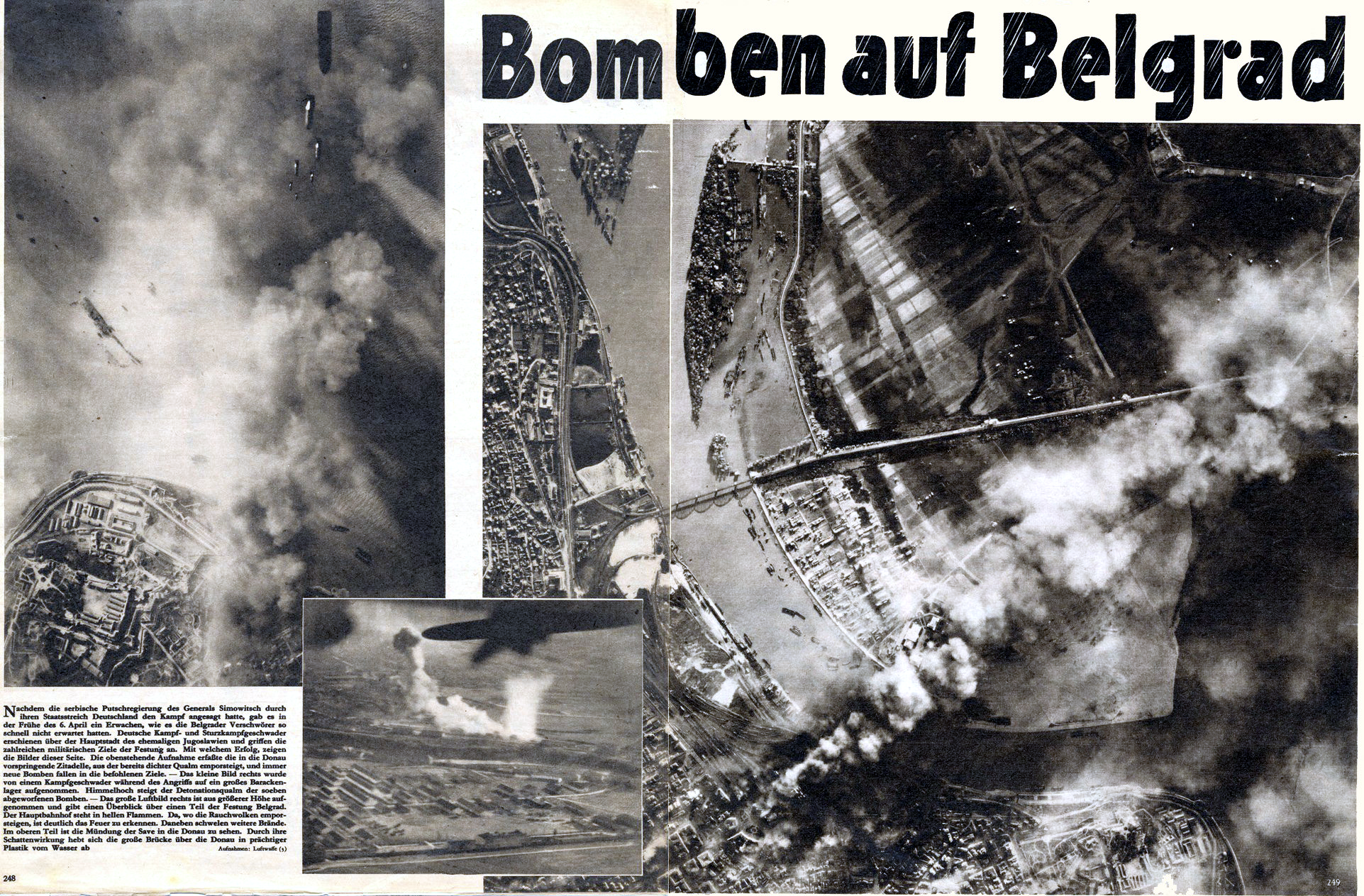
The Luftwaffe propaganda airimage of Belgrade burning, as appeared in the Nazi propaganda magazine Der Adler, No. 9, 29 April 1941.

The Axis invasion of Greece.

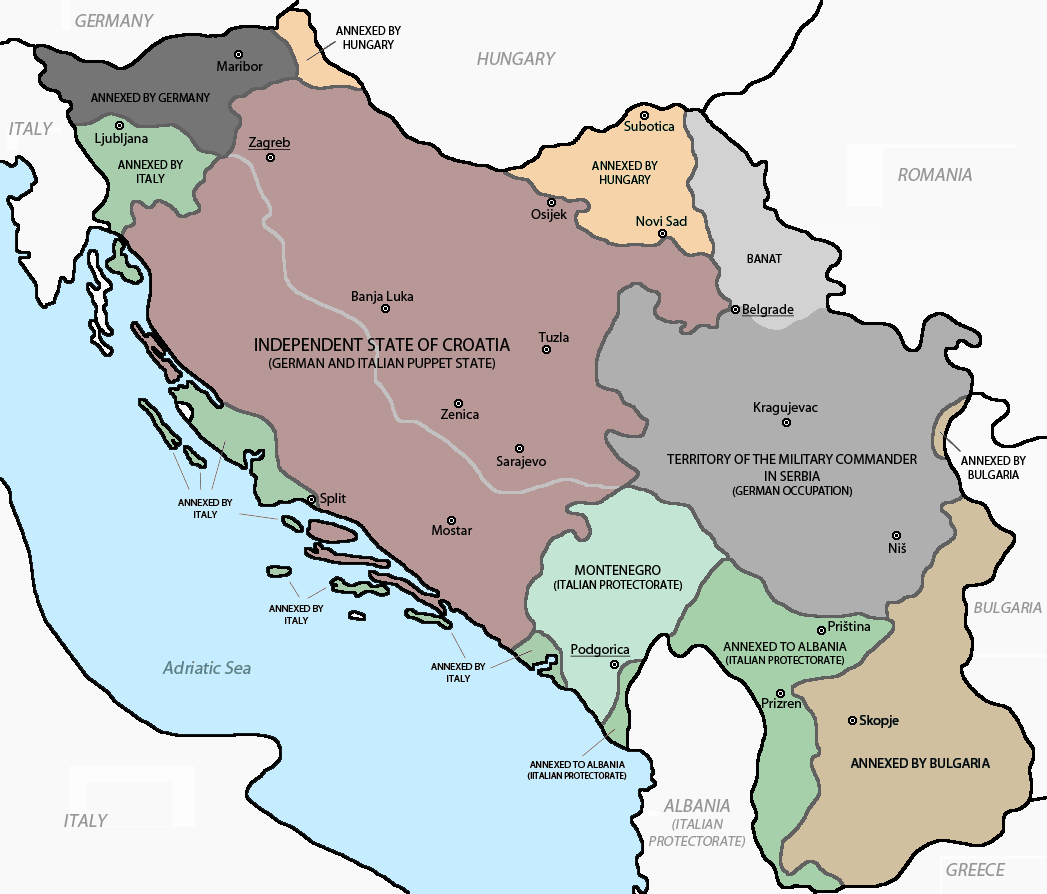
Occupation and partition of Yugoslavia, 1941–43.

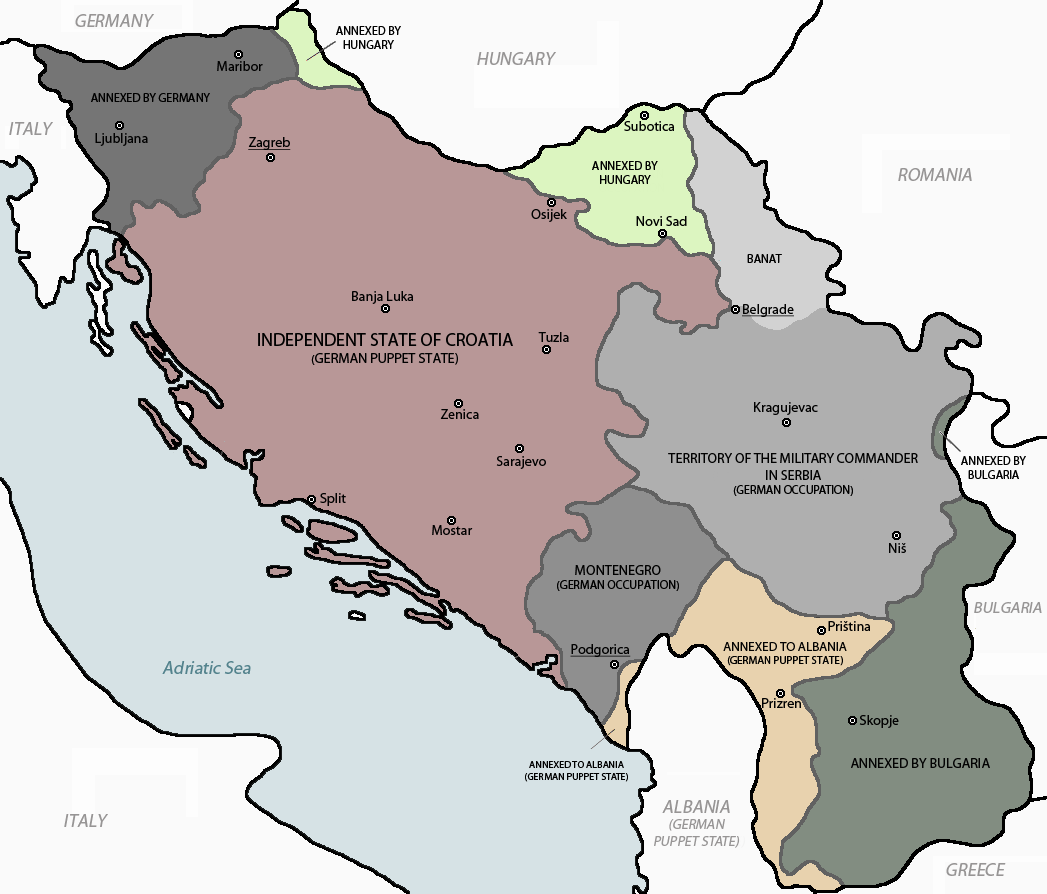
Occupation and partition of Yugoslavia, 1943–44.

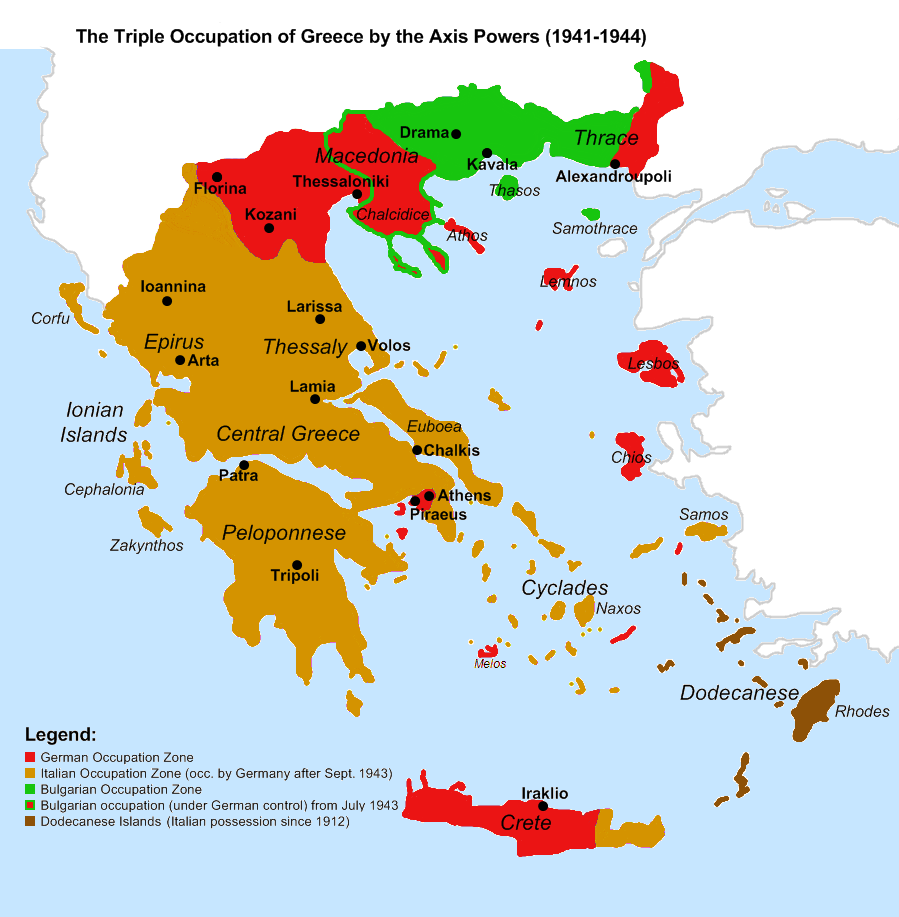
Occupation and partition of Greece, 1941–44.

== See also ==
- List of Adolf Hitler's directives
- World War II in Yugoslavia
  - The Holocaust in Yugoslavia
- Military history of Greece during World War II
  - Axis occupation of Greece
  - The Holocaust in Greece
- Wilhelm Keitel – Chief of the High Command of the German Armed Forces
- Walther von Brauchitsch – Head of the High Command of the German Army (1938–1941)
- Hermann Göring – Head of the High Command of the German Air Force
- Viktor von Heeren – German Ambassador to Yugoslavia (1933–1941)
- Victor zu Erbach-Schönberg – German Ambassador to Greece (1936–1941)

== Bibliography ==
- Playfair, I. S. O.; Flynn, F. C.; Molony, C. J. C. & Toomer, S. E. (2004) [1956]. Butler, J. R. M. (ed.). The Mediterranean and Middle East: The Germans Come to the Help of Their Ally (1941). History of the Second World War, United Kingdom Military Series. Vol. II. Naval & Military Press. ISBN 1-84574-066-1.
- Dedijer, Vladimir (1956). "Sur l'armistice "germano-yougoslave" (7 avril 1941) (Peut-on dire qu'il y eut réellement un armistice?)". Revue d'histoire de la Deuxième Guerre mondiale. 6 (23): 1–10.
- Trevor-Roper, Hugh (1964). Hitler's War Directives: 1939–1945. Viborg: Norhaven Paperback. ISBN 1-84341-014-1.
- Tomasevich, Jozo (1969), "Yugoslavia during the Second World War", in Vucinich, Wayne S. (ed.), Contemporary Yugoslavia: Twenty Years of Socialist Experiment, Berkeley: University of California Press, pp. 59–118, ISBN 978-05-200153-6-4
- Tomasevich, Jozo (1975). War and Revolution in Yugoslavia, 1941–1945: The Chetniks. Stanford: Stanford University Press. ISBN 978-0-8047-0857-9.
- Middleton, Drew (21 June 1981). "Hitler's Russian Blunder". The New York Times.
- Gilbert, Martin (1989). Second World War. London: Weidenfeld and Nicolson. ISBN 978-0-297-79616-9.
- Shirer, William L. (2002). The Rise and Fall of the Third Reich: A History of Nazi Germany. London: Random House. ISBN 978-0-09-942176-4. Archived from the original on 29 July 2024.
- Boog, Horst; Krebs, Gerhard; Vogel, Detlef (2006). Germany and the Second World War: Volume VII: The Strategic Air War in Europe and the War in the West and East Asia, 1943–1944/5. Oxford, England: Oxford University Press. ISBN 978-1-280-75877-5.
- Norris, David A. (2008). Belgrade: A Cultural History. Oxford, England: Oxford University Press. ISBN 978-0-19-970452-1.
- Knell, Herman (2009). To Destroy a City: Strategic Bombing and Its Human Consequences in World War II. Cambridge, Massachusetts: Da Capo Press. ISBN 978-0-7867-4849-5.
- Kurapovna, Marcia (2010). Shadows on the Mountain: The Allies, the Resistance, and the Rivalries that Doomed WWII Yugoslavia. John Wiley & Sons, Inc.
