= Chetnik Command =

Military operation plan of the Yugoslav government

- Active: April 1940–18 April 1941
- Country: Yugoslavia
- Branch: Royal Yugoslav Army
- Type: Infantry
- Size: Division
- Part of: Ministry of the Army and Navy
- Headquarters: Novi Sad, Kraljevo
- Engagements: Invasion of Yugoslavia (1941)

Commanders
- Notable commanders: Mihailo Mihailović

The Chetnik Command (Serbo-Croatian: Četnička komanda/Четничкa команда) was a military operation plan of the Yugoslav government in an expected invasion of Yugoslavia. It was part of the military plans to lead guerrilla warfare, earlier developed. It was established in April 1940, including the organization of six complete and one incomplete battalion recruited from the regular Royal Yugoslav Army on voluntary basis. The six battalions (known as "assault battalions", jurišni bataljoni, or "Chetnik battalions", četnički bataljoni) were added to each Field Army (of which there were seven), placed in Novi Sad, Sarajevo, Skopje, Karlovac, Niš and Mostar. Its headquarters was transferred from Novi Sad to Kraljevo in south-central Serbia on 1 April. Between 10 July 1940 and 1 April 1941 the official name was the Assault Command (Serbo-Croatian: Jurišna komanda/Јуришна команда). Although a traditional notion, the Yugoslav military did not use the Chetnik idea in its military planning until 1940. It had little support in the highest ranks whose views were formed in World War I. It had the rank of Division, and was directly subordinated to the Ministry of the Army and Navy. The first commander was division general (divizijski đeneral) Mihailo Mihailović. It was activated on 1 April 1941 and saw action in the April War (6–18 April 1941). The Chetnik Command had no relation to the pre-war Chetnik associations and the later Chetnik Movement of Draža Mihailović.

== Units ==
- 1. Novi Sad
- 2. Sarajevo
- 3. Skoplje
- 4. Karlovac
- 5. Niš
- 6. Mostar
- 7. Kraljevo

== See also ==
- Yugoslav order of battle prior to the invasion of Yugoslavia

== Sources ==
- Babac, Dušan (2006). Specijalne jedinice Jugoslovenske vojske u Aprilskom ratu (PDF). Beograd. ISBN 86-85957-12-5.
- Jevtić, Branko M.; Bogdanović, Branko (2013). Jurišni bataljoni vojske Kraljevine Jugoslavije – Od mita do istine. Beograd: Beoknjiga.
- Krsmanović, Dragan (3 November 2014). "Јуришни батаљони Војске Краљевине Југославије". Beograd: Srbija Danas.
- Milivojević, Marko; Allcock, John B.; Maurer, Pierre, eds. (1988). "Yugoslavia's Security Dilemmas: Armed Forces, National Defence, and Foreign Policy". East European and Soviet Studies. Berg. ISBN 978-0-85496-149-8.
- Mirčetić, Dragoljub (1994). Vojna istorija Niša. Vol. 2. Prosveta.
- Tomašević, Jozo (1979). Četnici u Drugom svjetskom ratu: 1941-1945. Sveučilišna naklada Liber.
- Životić, Aleksandar (2011). "Četničke jedinice Vojske Kraljevine Jugoslavije u Aprilskom ratu" [The Chetnik units of the Yugoslav Army in April War 1941] (PDF). Istorija 20. Veka (in Serbian). 29: 39–47. doi:10.29362/ist20veka.2011.1.ziv.39-47.
- Životić, Aleksandar (2003). "Јуришне (четничке) јединице војске Краљевине Југославије 1940-41". Војноисторијски гласник. 1–2. Beograd: Vojnoistorijski institut.
- ANUBiH (1970). Djela. Vol. 24–28. Akademija nauka i umjetnosti Bosne i Hercegovine, Odjeljenje društvenih nauka. p. 199.
