= László Deseő =

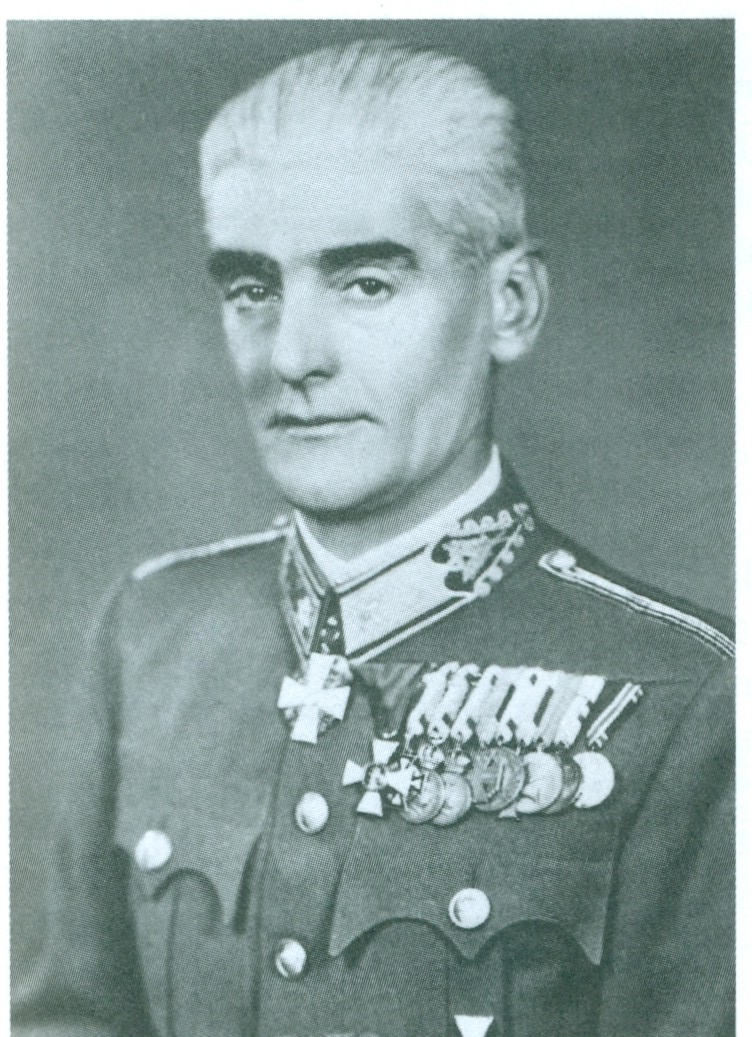
- Born: 26 June 1893; Sárospatak, Austria-Hungary
- Died: 25 June 1948 (aged 54); Krasnoyarsk, Soviet Union
- Military career
- Allegiance: Austria-Hungary; Hungary
- Service years: 1913–1943
- Rank: Major General
- Commands: 1st Corps (Hungarian Second Army)
- Conflicts: World War I World War II

László Deseő (26 June 1893 – 25 June 1948) was a Hungarian military officer and diplomat, who served as artillery commander of the Hungarian Second Army's First Corps during the Second World War.

Deseő was captured after the Battle of Stalingrad. He died as a prisoner of war (his number was 8355) in the Soviet Union in 1948 one day before his 55th birthday.
