= Operation Panzerfaust =

1944 Nazi German military operation to replace Hungary's leadership with loyalists

- Part of World War II
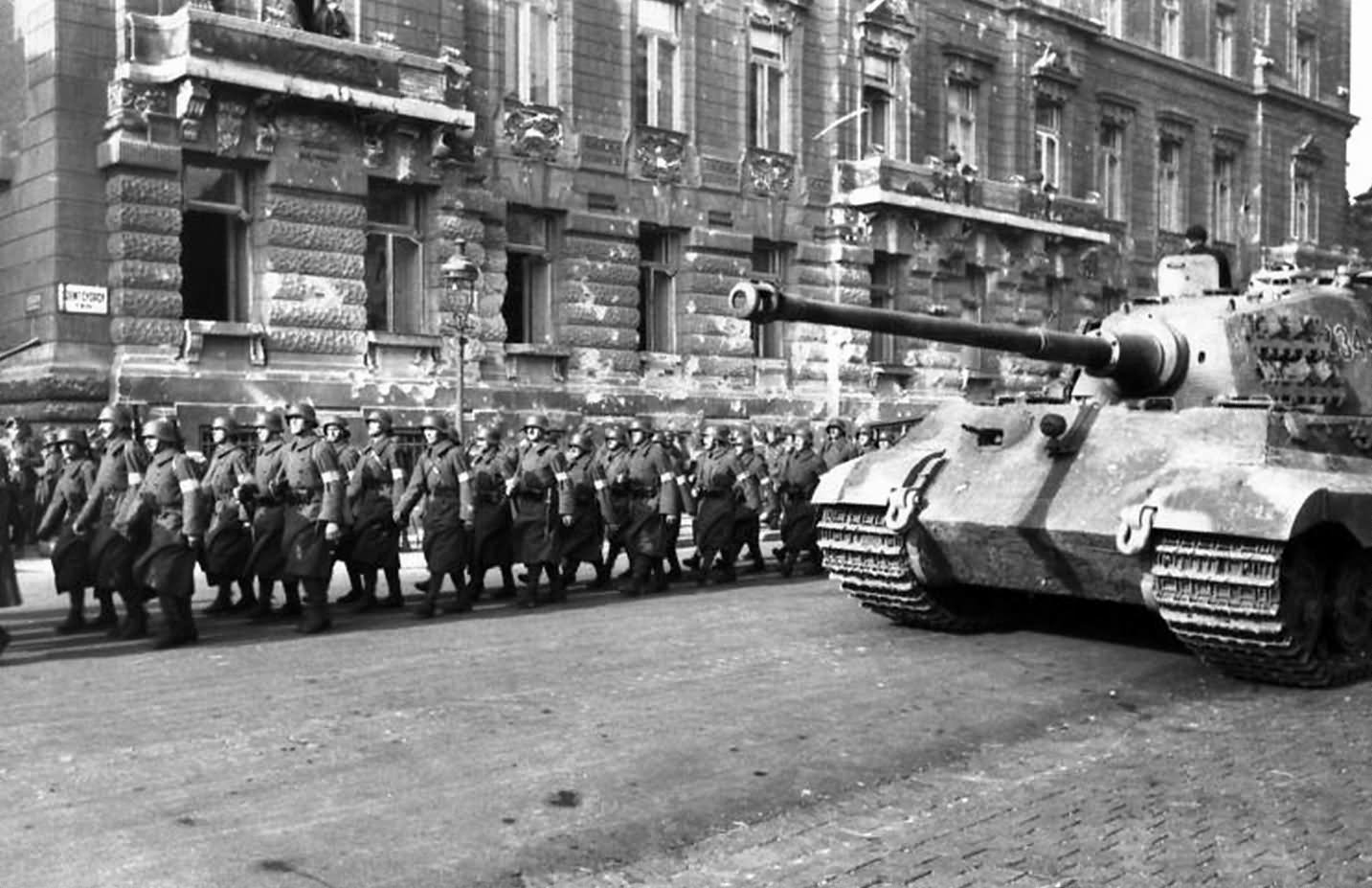
- German Tiger II tanks and Arrow Cross troops march to Buda Castle
Date	15–16 October 1944
Location	Budapest, Kingdom of Hungary
Result	Overthrow of Regent Miklós Horthy; Pro-Nazi Arrow Cross Party came to power

Belligerents
Germany: NYKP	Hungary

Commanders and leaders
Edmund Veesenmayer; Otto Skorzeny; Ferenc Szálasi; Károly Beregfy; Iván Hindy; Adrian von Fölkersam	Miklós Horthy (POW); Géza Lakatos (POW); Lajos Csatay ‡‡; János Vörös; Béla Miklós; Lajos Veress (POW)

Operation Panzerfaust (German: Unternehmen Panzerfaust, lit. 'Operation Armored Fist') was a military operation undertaken in October 1944 by the German Wehrmacht to ensure the Kingdom of Hungary would remain a German ally in World War II. When German leader Adolf Hitler received word that Hungary's Regent, Admiral Miklós Horthy, was secretly negotiating his country's surrender to the advancing Red Army, he sent commando leader Otto Skorzeny of the Waffen-SS and former special forces commander Adrian von Fölkersam to Hungary. Hitler feared that Hungary's surrender would expose his southern flank, where Romania had just joined with the Soviets, and cut off a million German troops still fighting the Soviet advance in the Balkans. The operation was preceded by Operation Margarethe in March 1944, which was the occupation of Hungary by German forces, which Hitler had hoped would secure Hungary's place in the Axis powers. This had also enabled the deportation of the majority of Hungarian Jews, previously beyond the reach of the Nazis, through uneasy cooperation with Hungarian authorities. This policy was, however, terminated as Soviet forces drew closer and the USAAF, based in Italy, began bombing Hungary, including Budapest.

== Prelude ==
On 23 August 1944, King Michael of Romania dismissed Marshal Ion Antonescu as prime minister, signed an armistice with the all the "Big Three" Allied powers and declared war on Germany and Hungary. King Michael's coup and Romania's defection from the Axis to the Allied camps had a decisive impact on Hungary as it undermined Germany's entire position in the Balkans and cut the Reich off from its principle source of oil. Romania's defection also ensured that the Allies would support returning northern Transylvania to Romania, which Soviet and Romanian forces promptly invaded. Horthy, following the advice of his closest adviser, the former prime minister István Bethlen, had long considered appointing General Géza Lakatos as the prime minister in order to sign an armistice with the Allies. With the crisis caused by Romania's defection, Horthy and Bethlen decided that now was the time to dismiss General Döme Sztójay as prime minister. On 29 August 1944, Horthy sacked Sztójay and appointed Lakatos as the new prime minister. Lakatos decided to keep most of Sztójay's cabinet, including the Agricultural Minister Béla Jurcsek and the Finance Minister Lajos Reményi-Schneller. Both Jurcsek and Reményi-Schneller worked as spies for Germany, selling the minutes of cabinet discussions, a role that they had played during the government of Döme Sztójay and in the case of Reményi-Schneller in the government of Miklós Kállay as well. Jurcsek and Reményi-Schneller continued to work as spies during Lakatos's government.

On 6 September 1944, Lakatos told Horthy that the Soviets had broken through the German-Hungarians lines in Transylvania and would soon be on the Great Hungarian Plain. On 7 September 1944, Horthy called a meeting of the Crown Council that was attended by the entire Council of Ministers as well. Horthy announced that he was going to sign an armistice with the Allies as the war was clearly lost for the Axis powers. Most of Lakatos's cabinet led by Jurcsek and Reményi-Schneller objected, saying it was better to fight on and see all of Hungary destroyed than sign an armistice with the Soviet Union. To resolve the deadlock, the Defense Minister Lajos Csatay put forward a compromise, namely to make an impossible demand on Adolf Hitler, demanding send four panzer divisions to Transylvania or else Hungary would sign an armistice. Lakatos accepted Csatay's idea. Lakatos stated that was a major blunder, writing: "With this we delayed the step for an armistice. At the same time we drew the Germans' attention to our preparations. This decided our fate. Militarily we did not get serious assistance, while more and more German troops were brought into the capital and surroundings...they armed the Arrow Cross and prepared them so that with the first possible instance power would be given to Szálasi and comrades. At the time I did not see this clearly...Now of course I know, that in that moment the scales were tipped". Both Jurcsek and Reményi-Schneller afterwards told Edmund Veesenmayer, the German minister plenipotentiary, that Horthy and Lakatos were going to sign an armistice.

On 10 September 1944, Horthy called a meeting at the Royal Castle that consisted of his closest friends and advisers. The meeting was attended prime minister Geza Lakatos, István Bethlen, the Defense Minister Lajos Csatay, the Foreign Minister Gusztáv Hennyey, Count Móric Esterházy, General János Vörös, the former prime minister Count Gyula Károlyi, General Vilmos Rőder, Kálmán Kánya, Baron Zsigmond Perényi, General István Náday, Baron Dániel Bánffy, Bela Teleki, and General Hugó Sónyi. The three most important speakers were Lakatos, the chief of the general staff Vörös, and Bethlen. Bethlen stated that the war was lost and the best that could be hoped to be achieved was an armistice. The Honved {Royal Hungarian Army) generals at the meeting objected strenuously objected, saying it was better to fight on as an ally of Nazi Germany and see of all of Hungary "burn" than sign an armistice with the Soviet Union, they predicted would lead to a Communist regime. Furthermore, the generals noted that it would dishonorable to sign an armistice without informing Hitler first, even though everyone knew what Hitler's most probable reaction would be. The meeting ended with the plan that Horthy would sign an armistice, but also inform Hitler in advance.

Lakatos insisted on informing the cabinet as well of the decision to sign an armistice. At the meeting of the Council of Ministers of 11 September 1944, Lakatos told the cabinet what had been decided and was faced with a cabinet revolt as the entire cabinet rejected the idea of signing an armistice. Later the same day, Horthy called a meeting attended by his close friends and family to decide what to to. The regent decided to sign an armistice without informing Lakatos, Vörös and Hennyey, saying as the Supreme Warlord he had the right to decide issues of war and peace. Horthy still held to the hope that he might be able to sign an armistice with Britain and the United States only. On 20 September 1944, Horthy asked Náday to go to Italy to sign an armistice with the Americans and the British. On the same day, a SS commando team led by SS-Obersturmbannführer Otto Skorzeny arrived in Budapest with orders to kidnap Horthy. On the night of 22 September 1944, Náday flew to Foggia along with a British POW, Colonel Charles Howie. Náday met with Field Marshal Henry Maitland Wilson, the Supreme Allied Commander for the Mediterranean theater of operations, who bluntly told him that the Hungarians were not allowed to pick and chose which of the Allies to sign an armistice with. Wilson told Náday that Hungary could either sign an armistice with all of the Big Three Allied powers or none at all. Náday returned to Budapest to tell Horthy he was going to sign an armistice with the Soviet Union. The same day, the Red Army broke through the German-Hungarian lines in the Carpathian mountains and entered the Great Hungarian Plain, which finally convinced Horthy that he would have to sign an armistice with the Soviet Union. Skorzeny had initially planned to kidnap Horthy, but discovered that the Royal Castle was too well guarded, which led him to instead decide to kidnap Horthy's son, Miklós Horthy Jr., as a way to force his father to abdicate.

On 28 September 1944, a three-man delegation led by General Gabor Faragho, the former military attaché to the Soviet Union who spoke fluent Russian, left for Moscow via Slovakia. The mission had been set up by Count Ladomėr Zichy, a Hungarian aristocrat of strongly left-wing views who owned an estate in Slovakia. During the Slovak Uprising, Zichy had been in contact with a Soviet partisan unit led by a Colonel Makarov sent to assist the Slovaks who told him that he could arrange for the Hungarians to send an delegation to Moscow to sign an armistice. The three men delegation broke up and travelled across the countryside via separate cars and then crossed by foot into Slovakia. From there, they met Zichy at a prearranged point who in turn took them to a secret airfield where a plane flew them to Moscow. Faragho arrived in Moscow on 1 October 1944.. The armistice talks in Moscow were pointlessly dragged out for 11 days by the Hungarian demand that Faragho only sign a "preliminary armistice" that would halt the advance to the Red Army into Hungary with the actual armistice to end the fighting to be signed at some later, undetermined point. Horthy still held to the hope that the Anglo-American armies in Italy might reach Hungary, and he saw the "preliminary armistice" as a way to stall the Red Army's advance. The Soviet delegation led by Colonel-General Vasily Kuznetsov insisted on an actual armistice on the principle of unconditional surrender along with Hungary declaring war on Germany and offering the Red Army full assistance in advancing across Hungary to reach the Reich. The talks were broken off for several days and only resumed on 5 October 1944. The Hungarians were helped in the armistice talks by the summit that was occurring in Moscow at the same time as the British prime minister Winston Churchill and Foreign Secretary Anthony Eden were engaged in talks with Joseph Stalin and the Foreign Commissar Vyacheslav Molotov about the post-war future of Eastern Europe. To impress their British guests, the Soviets wanted to be perceived as magnanimous victors. The armistice that was signed n Moscow on 11 October 1944 was primarily military and did not touch upon the political structure of Hungary. The armistice called for fighting to stop on 20 October, for Hungary to return to the borders created by the Treaty of Trianon in 1920, for Allied Supervisory Commission to be on the ground to monitor that Hungary was complying with the armistice, and for Hungary to declare war on Germany.

Through his spies in the Hungarian government, Veesenmayer was aware that there were armistice talks going on in Moscow in early October 1944, which led to recommend to Berlin that it was time to depose Horthy. On 11 October 1944, Veesenmayer met with Ferenc Szálasi to tell him to prepare the Arrow Cross to take power soon. Emil Kovarcz, a former Honved general who commanded the Arrow Cross's paramilitary wing, started planning for a coup, making preparations for the Arrow Cross militia to seize radio stations, government offices, police stations and the offices of the Royal Hungarian Gendarmerie. On 11 October 1944, Horthy agreed to meet two members of the opposition Hungarian Front, Zoltán Tildy of the Smallholders and Árpád Szakasits of the Social Democrats. Horthy declined to meet László Rajk, the Communist revolutionary who wanted to arm the working class of Budapest.. Szakasits claimed it was agreed that a general strike would be called on 17 October 1944 against the war, which would shut down the entire transportation system and on that day the armistice would come into effect. Horthy started to pull back Honved troops to Budapest as he anticipated the German reaction to the news of the armistice, but the withdrawal proceeded slowly, in large part because he did not trust the chief of the general staff, Vörös. On October 14, 1944, Horthy decided to bring the armistice into effect the next day, apparently because he did not want to wait until the 20th. Both Vörös and Lakatos protested that this was a highly rash decision, saying that they did not have time to prepare and it was not certain if all of the Honved generals would accept the armistice. Lakatos made a number of changes to the speech Horthy planned to give on Sunday, October 15, announcing the armistice, which garbed the message while deleting the line "from this day Hungary considers herself to be at war with Germany".

== The Kidnapping of Miklos Horthy Jr. ==
Having anticipated Horthy's move, Skorzeny had been instructed to remove Horthy from power. Horthy's son Miklós Horthy Jr. was meeting with Soviet representatives. Miklós Jr. was informed by the German Security Service through intermediaries that envoys of Marshal Tito of Yugoslavia wanted to meet with him. Horthy Jr., like his father, rarely left the well guarded Royal Castle, and Skorzeny needed a ruse to lure him out. Admiral Horthy had given his son permission to meet the supposed Yugoslav representatives out of the mistaken belief that the meeting would take place in the Royal Castle.

Miklós Jr. had failed to keep a prior meeting when he observed suspicious individuals near the proposed meeting place. A second meeting was set for early 15 October at the offices of Felix Bornemisza, the Director of the Hungarian Danube ports. He hoped that the Yugoslavian representatives might have important news, but upon entering the building, it was surrounded by the SS. When several SS men entered the building, Horthy Jr.'s bodyguards opened fire, leading to a firefight that lasted several minutes. After killing several of Horthy Jr.'s bodyguards, Skorzeny and his troops attacked and beat him into submission. They then kidnapped Miklós at gunpoint, trussed him up in a carpet, immediately drove him to the airport and flew him to Vienna. From there, he was transported to Mauthausen concentration camp.

== Horthy's declaration of armistice ==
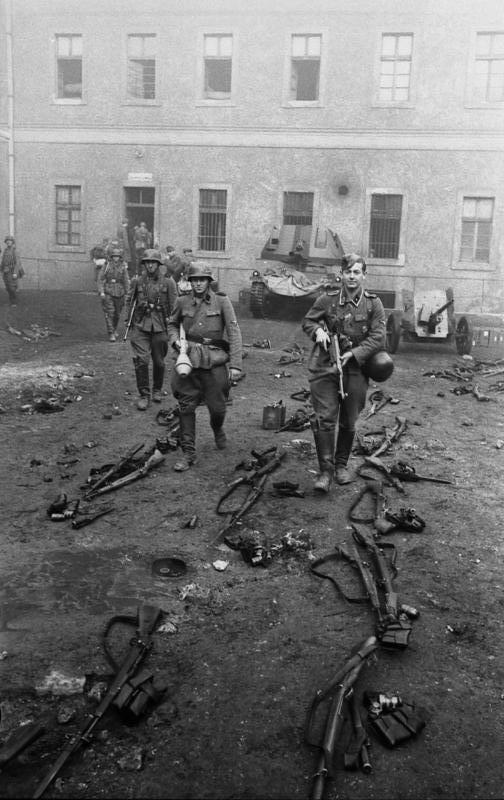
Waffen-SS soldiers inspecting abandoned Hungarian equipment.

Working through his trustworthy General Béla Miklós, who was in contact with Soviet forces in eastern Hungary, Horthy attempted to negotiate the end of the war, seeking to surrender to the Soviets while preserving the government's autonomy. Although Horthy was an intractable anti-Communist, his dealings with the Nazis led him to conclude the Soviets were the lesser evil. The Soviets willingly promised that Hungary would remain autonomous and sovereign.

Horthy governed from Castle Hill in central Budapest, an ancient and now well-guarded fortress. At about 11 am, he called a meeting of the Crown Council which was also attended by his family. There, he first learned from his daughter-in-law Ilona Horthy that his son had been kidnapped. Horthy was clearly upset with the news, but was able to recover within a half a hour. Horthy had already lost one son, István Horthy, who had been killed in an airplane crash in 1942 and the prospect of losing another son, was deeply distressing to him. Lakatos and his entire cabinet submitted their resignations, but all of them were promptly re-appointed by Horthy including Jurczsek and Renényi-Schneller whom everyone suspected were working as spies for Germany.

At this point, Veesenmayer arrived at the Royal Castle and held an immediate meeting with Horthy, Lakatos, and Hennyey. Horthy expressed much anger to Veesenmayer for the kidnapping of his own son, saying that this was not going to stop him from announcing the armistice. Veesenmayer asked Horthy to put off announcing the armistice until he had met his superior, Rudolf Rahn, who had just arrived in Budapest. Much to the disgust of Horthy and his family, Lakatos agreed to this demand, saying that Horthy should announce nothing until he had met Rahn, saying that the life of Horthy Jr. was now in balance. Veesenmayer then left the Royal Castle, telling Horthy to think carefully as his son's life would depend upon his actions. Horthy insisted on giving the announcement of the armistice on the national radio over the protests of his advisers who still wanted him to see Rahn first. Ilona Horthy gave the orders to issue a written announcement that the armistice was now in effect, and faced resistance from several officials who wanted to wait instead for Horthy to see Rahn. At one point, she rebuked Lakatos, saying that her father-in-law did not want to meet Rahn and the announcement should go immediately, saying that as a soldier he had no excuse for not following the regent's orders. Admiral Horthy blamed the German government for "forcing" Hungary into war, and during a meeting of the Crown Council declared that:

Today it is obvious to any sober-minded person that the German Reich has lost the war. All governments responsible for the destiny of their countries must draw the appropriate conclusions from this fact, for as a great German statesman, Bismarck, once said, 'No nation ought to sacrifice itself on the altar of an alliance.' … I decided to safeguard Hungary's honour even against her former ally, although this ally, instead of supplying the promised military help, meant finally to rob the Hungarian nation of its greatest treasure, its freedom and independence. I informed a representative of the German Reich that we were about to conclude a military armistice with our former enemies and to cease all hostilities against them.

At 2:00 p.m. on 15 October 1944, Horthy announced in a national radio broadcast that Hungary had signed an armistice with the Soviets. Horthy's speech on the radio was vague and confusing, and everyone who heard it was not certain if Horthy had said he had signed an armistice or was merely opening armistice talks with the Soviet Union. However, the Germans had been aware of Horthy's behind-the-scenes manoeuvring and had already set in motion plans to replace his government with forces loyal to the German cause, effectively occupying Hungary. With Nazi help, the Arrow Cross Party seized the radio station shortly after Horthy signed off. A party member wrote a counter-proclamation and used the name of the Hungarian Army's Chief of the General Staff, General Vörös. The commanding officer and his assistant of the two remaining Hungarian army units in Budapest were arrested or disappeared, and their soldiers fell in line with the Arrow Cross Party.

Shortly after 3pm, Vörös, acting on his own authority had issued a "clarification" to all Honved generals, saying that Horthy had not signed an armistice with the Soviet Union, but had merely opened armistice talks and the war would continue until an armistice was signed, which undercut the armistice. One contemporary recalled on that day: "We knew that the Germans troops were pulling back from the Duna Tisza and the Red Army was moving with its relentless force from Szeged in the direction of Budapest. Then the radio announcement at 13:27 with Horthy's speech-which is really is vague, doesn't say a great deal, although seems to signal withdrawal. In his command to the army he says that it is decided they will ask for a ceasefire-not that they have done it already. That they should all follow his command. But not really clear what the command is. Later heard an unfamiliar voice-Jànos Vörös-the chief of staff-reading out a command to continue resistance. Hungarian troops to keep on fighting! Then, at first Hungarian marches-but then German marches; Erika, Lili Marleen, Prinz Eugen March-and brutal German voices".

Regardless of what Horthy and Vörös had said, the majority of the Honved officers held to the extreme right-wing views and the majority had rallied to the Arrow Cross. The GOC of the 1st Army, General Béla Miklós ordered his men to stop fighting and had to defect over to the Soviet lines to avoid being arrested by his own officers. General Lajos Dálnoki-Veress, the GOC of the 2nd Army, ordered his men to stop fighting and was rewarded for being arrested at gunpoint by his officers led by General Iván Hindy who told him he was guilty of "treason". The GOC of the 1st Corps, General Béla Aggteleky, announced that the armistice was now in effect and was likewise arrested at gunpoint by his own officers. Lieutenant Colonel Kálman Hardy who commanded the riparian forces of gunboats on the Danube river, was in the same fashion arrested by his own officers when he told them of the armistice. The majority of the Honved rallied to the Arrow Cross and by the evening of 15 October only the Royal Guard who protected the Royal Castle were the only Honved unit that Horthy was still certain was loyal to him. The Hungarian Front had not informed in advance that Horthy was going to announce the armistice and was taken completely unprepared. Late on the afternoon of 15 October, the leaders of the Hungarian Front called a hasty meeting where plans for a general strike were debated to stop the Arrow Cross coup. Horthy had rejected the requests of the Hungarian Front to arm the working class of Budapest while the Germans had provided the thuggish Arrow Cross militia with guns, which led to the general strike plan being abandoned.

For most of the afternoon, Horthy was unaware of what was happening. At 2: 30 pm, he called a meeting of the Crown Council, where he mentioned his earlier meeting with Veesenmayer, but declined to mention that an armistice had already signed. The majority of the ministers present were critical that Horthy had announced the armistice on the radio, but had failed to make any plans for the expected German coup d'etat. Horthy was unpleasantly surprised to learn that Vörös had issued his "clarification" and that the radio was now broadcasting a speech by Szàlasi, who was giving a "war command to the armed nation". By the evening of 15 October, only the 300 or so men who guarded the Royal Castle were the only unit that Horthy was completely certain that he had command as one by one various Honved units declared for Szàlasi or remained ominously silent when requested to affirm their loyalty to the regent. Lakatos and Hennyey had spent the afternoon negotiating with Veesenmayer and Rahn for a possible compromise that to the crisis. Szàlasi arrived at the Royal Castle about 7 pm, asking for Horthy to appoint him prime minister and was curtly refused. All over central and western Hungary, government offices were seized by either German soldiers or the Arrow Cross militia with support from German troops. Szàlasi now broadcast another command, appointing his friend, General Károly Beregfy, come to Budapest to serve as his defense minister. Lakatos had agreed to the German demand that Horthy abdicate as Regent in exchange for a promise that neither him nor his family would be harmed.

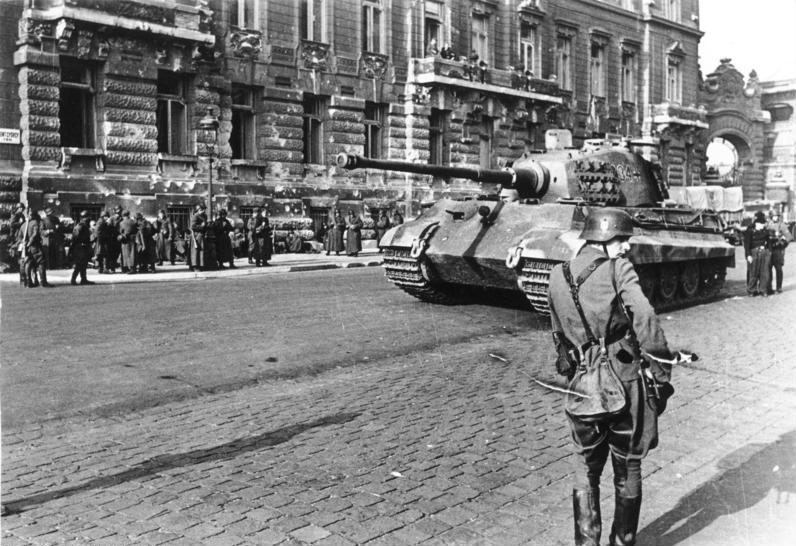
A Tiger II tank in Budapest near Buda Castle.

Skorzeny then brazenly led a convoy of German troops and four Tiger II tanks to the Vienna Gates of Castle Hill. Horthy recognized that he had no means to fight the German armor and superior forces. He issued orders that "no resistance should be made." One unit did not get these orders, and fought the Germans for about 30 minutes.

== Capture of Horthy ==
As German forces surrounded the Royal Castle, Horthy was woken up by his aide Vattay who told of the plan that Lakatos had agreed to, which Horthy rejected. Vattay falsely told Lakatos that had agreed to the surrender plan. At about 4 am, Horthy was again woken, this by General Lázár, the commander of the Royal Guard, who warned him that German forces were preparing for an attack on the Royal Castle. By 5 am, Horthy was dressed and loading his pistol for the expected battle. Lázár reported to the regent that Lakatos had just phoned to say that a conflict must be avoided at all costs. Shortly afterwards, Lakatos and Veesenmayer arrived at the Royal Castle in a German military car, to be greeted by Horthy at the front entrance. Lakatos advised Horthy to accept the deal he had made with Veesenmayer while Veesenmayer told Horthy he had 12 minutes to accept the offer. Veesenmayer stated if the offer was not accepted within the next 12 minutes, German forces would storm the Royal Castle. At this point, Horthy agreed to surrender and signed the instrument of abdication. Veesenmayer told Horthy to come with him to the Harvany Palace. The exchange took place with such politeness that the Hungarian soldiers observing the meeting from afar did not realise that the Horthy had just abdicated and was being taken into German custody. As Horthy was being driven, some of the Royal Guard who were not aware of his abdication, resisted the German atttempt to take possession of the Royal Castle, leading to a firefight that left several dead.

Horthy was taken into custody by Edmund Veesenmayer and his staff later on 15 October. Kept overnight in the Waffen SS offices, he returned to the Palace to collect his personal belongings. There he was confronted with a demand to sign a typewritten statement handed to him by Premier Géza Lakatos. The statement announced that Horthy was renouncing the armistice and abdicating in favour of Arrow Cross leader Ferenc Szálasi. Surprised that his loyal friend would encourage him to sign the document, Horthy was told by Lakatos that his son's life was at stake. When Horthy asked Veesenmayer if this was true, Veesenmayer confirmed the threat. The Regent understood that this was an effort to put the stamp of his prestige on a Nazi-sponsored Arrow Cross coup, but signed anyway.

Horthy later explained his capitulation: "I neither resigned nor appointed Szálasi Premier, I merely exchanged my signature for my son’s life. A signature wrung from a man at machine-gun point can have little legality."

Despite Veesenmayer's solemn promise to obtain Horthy's son's release from the German concentration camp, Miklós Jr. remained a prisoner until the war's end on 8 May 1945. Horthy and his family left Hungary on 17 October 1944 for a train to Germany. As Horthy's naval uniform had been looted by German soldiers, he was forced to dress as a huntsman. Horthy himself was transported to the Schloss Hirschberg near Weilheim, Germany, and guarded by 100 Waffen SS men at all times. On 1 May 1945, Lt. Gen. Alexander Patch, the commander of the US 7th Army, visited Horthy in his castle prison. Because Hungary had fought on to the end defending Germany, Horthy was considered a prisoner of war. Seven months later, on 17 December 1945, he was released from the Nuremberg penitentiary and was reunited with his family in a private home in Weilheim.

Horthy had long held to a romantic and idealised picture of the Honved with one contemporary, Kálmán Hardy, recalling that after meeting Horthy he came away with the impression that for the regent "the sworn and uniformed man is a gentleman." The former prime minister, Miklós Kállay, wrote in his memoirs that Horthy's biggest weakness was his romantic image of the Honved, writing "unfortunately the Hungarian army was not what he thought it was." Kállay wrote that the Honved "wanted to organize everything, and deeply despised parliamentarianism, liberal, and democratic ideas. And at the end of the thirties the first signs of German influence began to show." He wrote that a recurring problem throughout his entire time as prime minister was that Horthy "blindly believed the reports that came to him, was convinced of the loyalty of every officer, and saw in every general a gentleman of integrity." Gyula Kádár, the director of Hungarian military intelligence, warned Horthy in 1943 that most of the Honved officers were very pro-Nazi and would disobey an order to fight against Nazi Germany, which came as a great surprise to Horthy, who dismissed what Kádár was saying out of hand, saying that the officers were gentlemen who would obey their oaths to him because that what was what Hungarian officers and gentlemen did. The former defense minister, Vilmos Nagy de Nagybaczon, wrote that Horthy's tragedy was that "the regent was convinced that the officers would keep their oath and line up behind him when it came to a historic step, the magnitude of which he might not have grasped at first. Horthy could not imagine that there would be those in the officer corps who would conspire in the interests of a foreign power and betray their own people, and who would have the interests of the German Reich at heart rather than those of their own country." The Hungarian historian David Tubucz wrote that Horthy's inability to grasp that his romantic image of his officers was not based on reality was the biggest reason for the failure of his attempt to sign an armistice on 15 October 1944 as the majority of the Honved officers chose to break their oaths to the regent and sided with Szálasi.

== See also ==
- Operation Margarethe
- Operation Achse

== Books and articles ==
- Cornelius, Deborah S (2011). Hungary in World War II: Caught in the Cauldron. New York: Fordham University Press. ISBN 978-0823233441.
- Turbucz, Dávid (Winter 2025). "Under the Influence of His Leader Cult: Miklós Horthy's Self-Image During World War II". Hungarian Studies Review. 52 (1): 67–85.
