= Royal Hungarian Army =

Land forces of the Kingdom of Hungary (1919–1945)

Hungarian National Army Magyar Nemzeti Hadsereg (1919–1920) Royal Hungarian National Army Magyar Királyi Nemzeti Hadsereg (1920–1922) Royal Hungarian Army Magyar Királyi Honvédség (1922–1945)
- Infantry colour of the Royal Hungarian Army (1939–45)
- Active: 6 June 1919 – 8 May 1945
- Country: Hungarian Republic; Kingdom of Hungary
- Type: Army
- Size: 115,447 (1920); 35,000 (1921); 57,648 (1930); 85,332 (1937); 1,000,000 (1944)
- Garrison/HQ: Budapest
- Nickname: MKH
- Mottos: Királyért és hazáért "For King and Country"
- Anniversaries: 28 June
- Engagements: Subcarpathia; Slovak–Hungarian War; World War II: Invasion of Yugoslavia; Eastern Front

Commanders
- Supreme Warlord: Miklós Horthy (1919–44); Ferenc Szálasi (1944–45)
- Commander-in-Chief: Pál Nagy (1922–25); Hugó Sónyi (1936–40)
- Chief of the General Staff: Viktor Lorx (1922); Károly Beregfy (1944–45)
- Notable commanders: Károly Beregfy; Lajos Csatay; Elemér Gorondy-Novák; Gusztáv Jány; Géza Lakatos; Dezső László; Béla Miklós; Vilmos Nagy; Lajos Veress

Insignia
- Insignia (1942–1945)

- War Flag (1919–1939)

- War Flag (1939–1945)

The Royal Hungarian Army (Hungarian: Magyar Királyi Honvédség, German: Königlich Ungarische Armee) was the name given to the land forces of the Kingdom of Hungary in the period from 1922 to 1945. Its name was inherited from the Royal Hungarian Honvéd which went under the same Hungarian title of Magyar Királyi Honvédség from 1867 to 1918. Initially restricted by the Treaty of Trianon to 35,000 men, the army was steadily upgraded during the 1930s and fought on the side of the Axis powers during World War II.

== History ==
=== Background ===
As a vanquished power in World War I, Hungary had hardly grown at all in the immediate post-war years thanks to the territorial demands of its old and new neighbouring states, the Kingdom of Romania, Czechoslovakia and the Kingdom of Serbs, Croats and Slovenes. The Hungarian Red Army that was formed during the period of the Hungarian Soviet Republic, in which many world war veterans enlisted, was defeated by the allied armies in the Hungarian–Romanian war of 1919. The consequence was that large areas of Hungary were occupied and many regions that Hungary had claimed were finally lost.

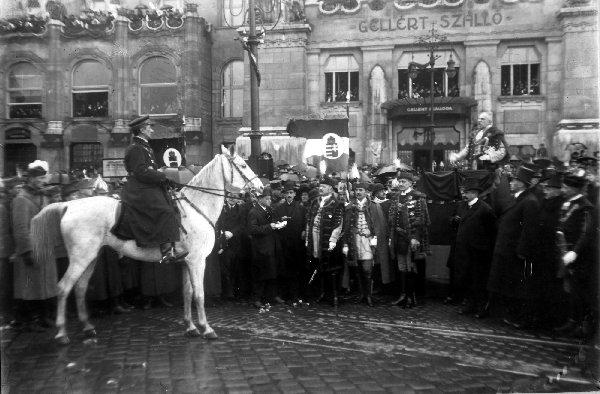
Admiral Horthy during the entry of the National Army in Budapest, November 1919

In July 1919 the former Commander-in-Chief of the Austro-Hungarian Navy, Admiral Miklós Horthy, had begun to set up the "National Army" (Hungarian: Nemzeti Hadsereg) as directed by the opposition government. This was supported by former k.u.k. officers like Gyula Gömbös, Döme Sztójay and Anton Lehár. After the withdrawal of Romanian troops in 1919/20 they took over the defence of the country, but remained dependent on the goodwill of the victorious powers that had met at the Paris Peace Conference.

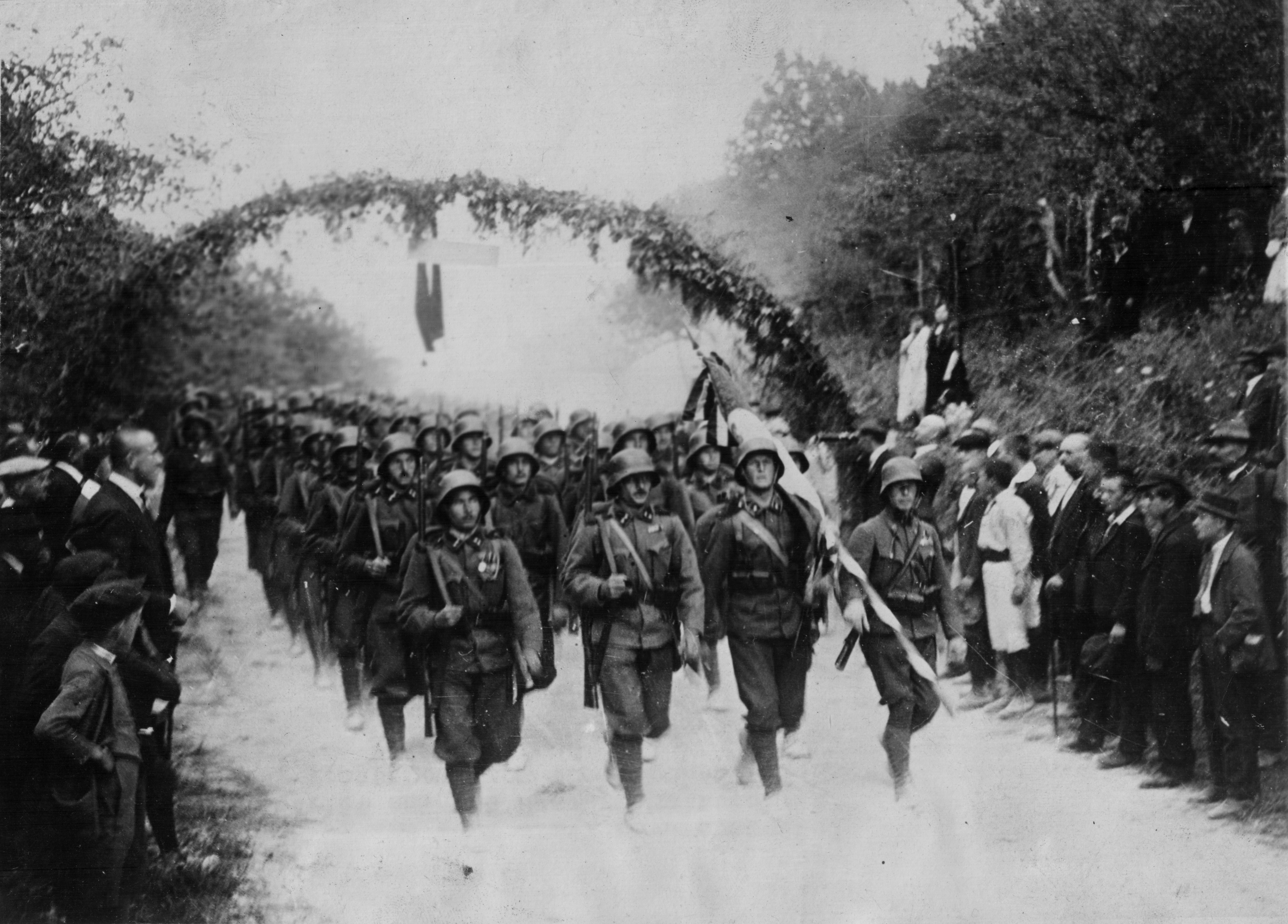
Hungarian troops occupy Baranya that had previously been cleared by the Yugoslav army, September 1921

The Treaty of Trianon that was signed on 4 June 1920 confirmed Hungary's territorial losses and restricted its armed forces to a volunteer organisation of 35,000 men. Heavy weapons such as heavy artillery, tanks, aircraft and anti-aircraft guns were forbidden as was the creation of a general staff. Compliance with these restrictions was supervised by an allied control commission.

=== Early years ===
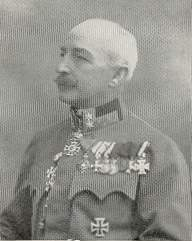
General Pál Nagy, the first commander of the Royal Hungarian Army

On 4 January 1922 the National Army was renamed the Royal Hungarian Army. On 11 May 1922 the new organisation came into being with seven military districts, each defended by a mixed brigade (Hungarian: Vegyesdandár). In addition there were two cavalry brigades and three engineer battalions.

The length of military service was three years. Pre-military training under the supervision of army officers was conducted in the youth organisation, Levente, founded in 1921. From the age of ten, boys who wanted to pursue an officer's career, could attend a military middle school. Potential officers were then trained at the Ludovica Military Academy in Budapest (for infantry or cavalry) or the János Bolyai College of Military Technology (for artillery, engineering and intelligence troops). Secret general staff courses were run from 1923 onwards. The senior officer corps was predominantly staffed by former k.u.k. officers, of which a disproportionate number were of German-Austrian extraction.

In addition to the army there were other armed organisations that were partly used to create a cadre of training military reservists. The most important of these was the gendarmerie (Hungarian: Csendőrség) which was subordinated to the Interior Ministry and was organised in the same way as the military districts and whose strength in places clearly exceeded that of the regular armed forces. Other organisations that took on ex-soldiers were the police, the customs and border guards and the treasury guard (Finanzwache). The river police (Hungarian: Folyamőrség) who monitored traffic on the River Danube with 8 patrol boats initially worked to the Interior Ministry until it was subordinated in January 1939 to the Defence Ministry as a corps of river troops (Hungarian: Magyar Királyi Honvéd Folyami Erők).

Monitoring by the allied control commission ended on 31 March 1927 and in the same year the government of István Bethlen signed a treaty of friendship with Fascist Italy which was intended to form a counterweight to the encirclement of Hungary by the powers of the Little Entente. In the years that followed the armament of the army, which had hitherto still consisted of wartime and pre-war stock, was modernised and, especially under Gyula Gömbös, defence minister from 1929, clandestinely expanded.

The re-establishment of an air force had been planned as early as 1920 by the Ministry of Transport and, from 1925, by the Air Office of the Ministry of Trade. On 6 December 1928 the Royal Hungarian Air Force (Hungarian: Magyar Királyi Honvéd Légierő) was founded, but its existence was kept secret until 1938.

=== Expansion and territorial changes from 1938 ===
On 5 March 1938, Prime Minister Kálmán Darányi announced the Győr Programme that envisaged the investment of a billion pengő over 5 years on the expansion of the armed forces. This was probably aimed at securing a rapid agreement with the Little Entente states on arms equality, something that was achieved by the Bled agreement in August 1938. The reorganization of the army began on 1 October 1938 under mobilisation plans Huba I-III. In the seven military districts, the mixed brigades were now grouped into corps of three brigades each (from February 1942, light divisions).

In November 1938 after the First Vienna Award, Hungarian troops occupied the disputed areas of Slovakia and Carpatho-Ukraine. In the occupied region an eighth corps was established. After the break-up of Czechoslovakia in March 1939, the whole of Carpatho-Ukraine was occupied and, a little later, following the brief Slovak–Hungarian War, a strip of land in East Slovakia.

That year conscription was re-introduced. A new military service act forced officers with a Jewish parent to withdraw from active service. The remaining Jews, along with members of other national minorities and politically unreliable soldiers, were sent to serve in unarmed labour battalions.

In March 1940, three field army commands were formed, each of three corps, together with the Gyorshadtest ("Rapid Corps"). The Chief of the General Staff now took over the military command that had previously been the responsibility of the Ministry of Defence. He was placed directly under the supreme commander, the regent.

Northern Transylvania, which had been promised to Hungary, was occupied in September 1940, after the Second Vienna Award and a ninth corps established there. On 20 November 1940, Hungary joined the Tripartite Pact.

Although minister president, Pál Teleki, had signed a friendship and non-aggression treaty with Yugoslavia in December 1940, in March 1941 Hungary allowed the German Wehrmacht to march through Hungarian territory. On 11 April 1941, following Telekis' suicide and by Hitler's invitation, the Hungarian 3rd Army joined the Balkans Campaign in the wake of which Bačka, Baranya, Prekmurje and Medjimurje were annexed.

=== Operation Barbarossa ===
Unlike their enemy, Romania, Germany did not envisage Hungary participating in Operation Barbarossa and, as a consequence, it was not directly involved in the preparations for the operation. The Chief of the General Staff, Henrik Werth, who was of German origin, pressed however for Hungarian participation in the campaign, supported by the Defence Minister, Károly Bartha. On 21 June, as a gesture to Germany, Hungary broke off diplomatic relations with the Soviet Union. A few days after the beginning of the war, on 26 June 1941, aircraft with Soviet markings bombed the Hungarian occupied towns of Kassa and Munkács, which gave Hungary the pretext to declare war on the Soviet Union.

On 1 July the so-called Carpathian Group (Hungarian: Kárpát Csoport) under Major General Ferenc Szombathelyi, consisting of the VIII Corps and the Rapid Corps, crossed the Soviet border and reached the Dniester within a week, meeting little Soviet resistance. The VIII Corps then remained as an occupation force in the conquered territory, while the Rapid Corps under Béla Miklós was subordinated operationally to the German 17th Army to participate in subsequent operations. It was involved in the battles of Uman and Kiev. By the end of October it had reached Izium on the Seversky Donets, before being recalled in late November to Hungary. Hitler had previously reached an agreement during a meeting with Horthy to provide five Hungarian "security brigades" to protect the hinterland in exchange for the deployment of the Rapid Corps. These were subordinated to the occupation group (Hungarian: Magyar Megszálló Csoport) formed on 6 October 1941, whose headquarters was moved from Vinnytsia to Kiev in December.

=== 1942–43 ===
On 7 Dec 1941, the United Kingdom declared war on Hungary who, in return, backed the German-Italian declaration of war on the United States on 13 Dec 1941. On 17 Jan 1942 Romania announced that they were participating in the 1942 campaign with two armies and, five days later, Hungary stated that they were ready to dispatch their own army. On 11 April the 2nd Army under Gusztáv Jány began moving to the front occupied by the German Army Group South near Kursk. The army took part in the German summer offensive, Fall Blau, that began in June 1942, and reached the River Don south of Voronezh in July, where it moved into defensive positions.

In Jan 1943, the 2nd Army was shattered by a major attack on the Voronezh Front (the Ostrogozhsk–Rossosh Offensive). The remnants were withdrawn from the front and allocated to occupation forces in Ukraine and southern Belarus. In summer 1943, a wide-ranging re-organization of the army was introduced: the Szabolcs I plan. The hitherto light divisions were largely disbanded and in their place fully fledged infantry and reserve divisions were formed. Two corps with a total of nine security divisions remained in the Soviet Union, where they were increasingly drawn into the fight with the advancing Red Army.

=== 1944 ===
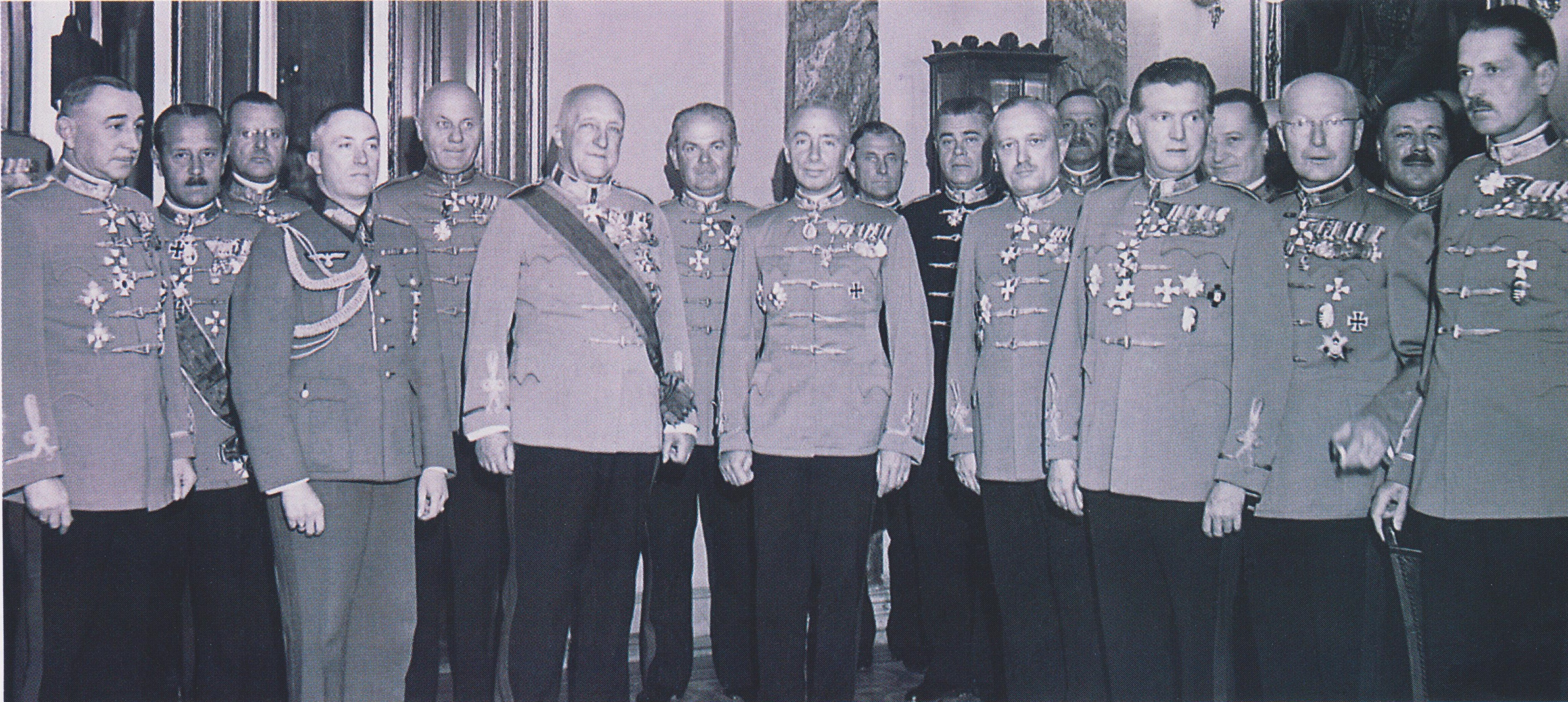
Archduke Joseph August and the General Staff of the Royal Hungarian Army in 1944.

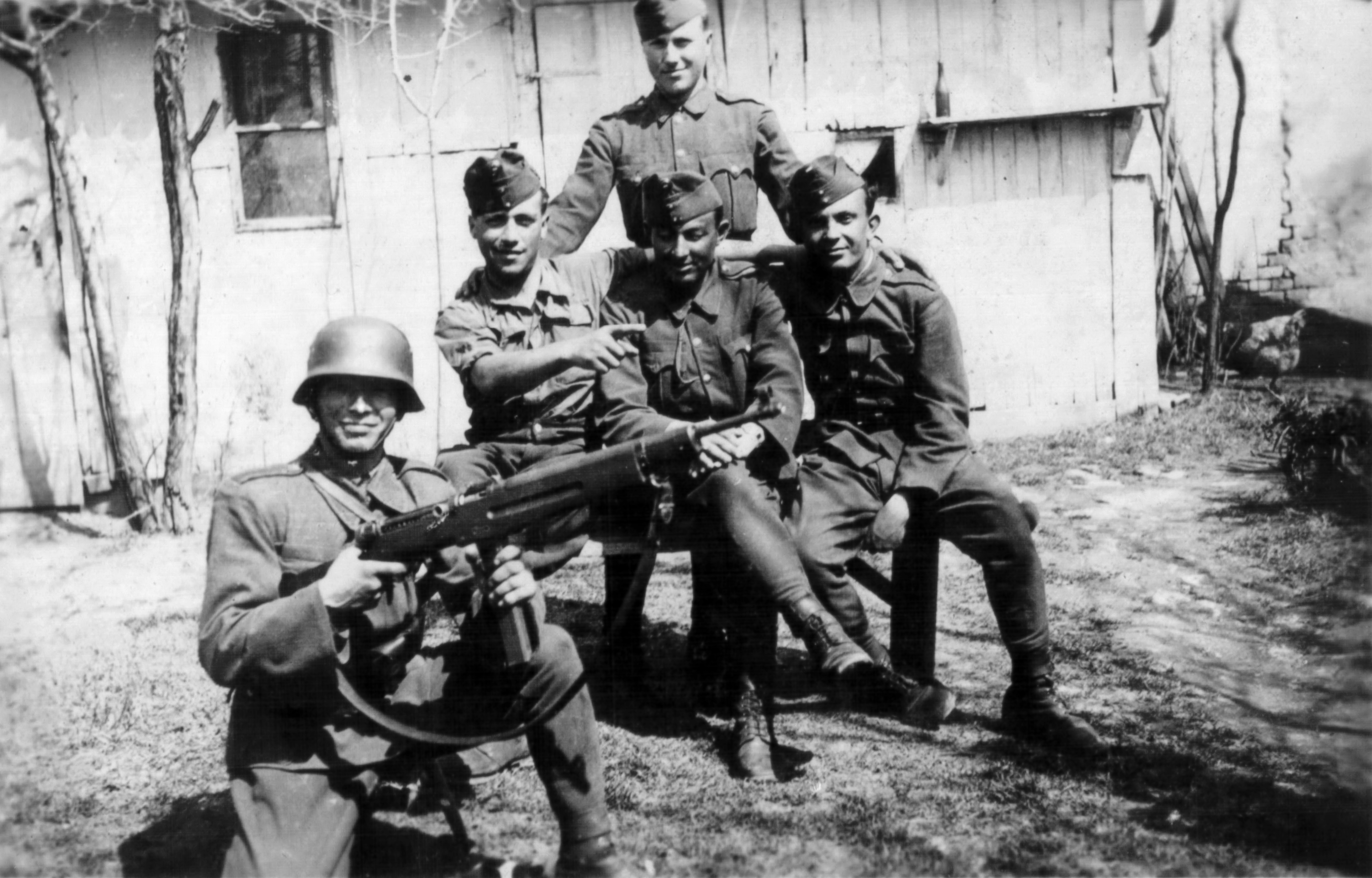
Hungarian soldiers in the Carpathian Mountains in 1944.

After the Hungarian government of Miklós Kállay had entered into negotiations with the Western Powers in summer 1943 over a separate peace agreement, Germano-Hungarian relations noticeably worsened. Hungary's refusal to provide troops for the occupation of the Balkans, as well as her demands, to pull occupation troops out of Ukraine and Belarus to defend the homeland, were viewed with suspicion by the Germans. In March 1944 the Wehrmacht occupied large parts of Hungary in Operation Margarethe in order to prevent her from leaving the Axis alliance. The largely demobilised Hungarian army offered no resistance. The newly elected government under Döme Sztójay declared itself ready to support the Germans with new deployments of troops.

In April the 1st Army under Géza Lakatos was sent to the front in East Galicia, in order to prevent the Soviets seizing the Carpathian passes. With the help of a newly established line of defence it was able to hold here until July 1944, before it had to pull back into the Carpathians in the face of the Lvov–Sandomierz Offensive.

At the end of August 1944, the 2nd and 3rd Armies were mobilised again, in order to defend Transylvania and South Hungary following Romania's change of sides. The 2nd Army was subordinated to Army Group Fretter-Pico. In the wake of the Carpatho-Dukla Offensive and Battle of Debrecen, the Hungarian-German armies were pushed back during September and October into the Great Hungarian Plain. During these battles, on 15 October, Reichsverweser Horthy was removed by the SS after his unilateral agreement of a ceasefire with the Soviet Union during Operation Panzerfaust, and the Arrow Cross Party under Ferenc Szálasi took over the government and control of the army. As a result, the commander of the 1st Army, Béla Miklós, went over to the Soviet side and they installed him as head of an opposition government with its headquarters in Debrecen. Its Defence Minister was ex-Chief of the General Staff, János Vörös, who had also defected to the Soviets.

A 102-day-long Siege of Budapest by troops of the 2nd and 3rd Ukrainian Fronts began on 3 Nov 1944 and they invested the city until 26 December. Amongst the encircled troops who surrendered on 13 February 1945 that included Wehrmacht and SS units, was the Hungarian I Corps.

=== End of the war and war crime trials ===
The 2nd Hungarian Army was disbanded in December 1944 after suffering heavy losses and the remaining units absorbed into the 3rd Army. The 1st Army pulled back to the Protectorate of Bohemia and Moravia after the fall of Budapest, where they surrendered in May 1945 to the 4th Ukrainian Front. The 3rd Army had taken part in March in the abortive Plattensee Offensive, after which it was largely disbanded. The remnants gave themselves up in May to British and American forces in Austria.

Many Hungarian officers were sentenced and executed for war crimes, including Ferenc Szombathelyi, József Grassy, Ferenc Feketehalmy-Czeydner and László Deák in Yugoslavia for their part in the massacre at Novi Sad, and Károly Beregfy, Döme Sztójay, Gusztáv Jány and Dezső László in Hungary.

== Naval forces ==
Royal Hungarian River Guard Magyar Királyi Folyamőrség (1921–1939) Royal Hungarian Army River Forces Magyar Királyi Honvéd Folyami Erők (1939–1945)
- Active: 1 March 1921 – 8 May 1945
- Country: Kingdom of Hungary
- Type: Navy
- Size: c. 1700 personnel
- Garrison/HQ: Budapest
- Engagements: World War II: Invasion of Yugoslavia; Eastern Front

Commanders
- Commander: Olaf Richárd Wulff (first) (1921–1933); Ödön Trunkwalter (last) (1944–1945)

Insignia
- Naval Ensign (1921–1939)

- Naval Ensign (1939–1945)

In April 1919 the Hungarian government established the Naval Forces (Hungarian: Hadihajós csapat, lit. 'warship group') under the authority of the Defence Ministry for the purpose of patrolling the Danube. It was replaced on 1 March 1921 by the civilian Royal Hungarian River Guard (Magyar Királyi Folyamőrség) under the Interior Ministry. Between March 1927 and May 1930, it expanded to about 1700 personnel, a number that held until the end of World War II. On 15 January 1939 the River Guard was renamed the Royal Hungarian Army River Forces (Magyar Királyi Honvéd Folyami Erők) and placed under the Defence Ministry. It used naval ranks until 1 July 1944, when it switched to army ranks. In April 1941 it took part in the invasion of Yugoslavia. From April 1944 on its minesweepers assisted the Kriegsmarine (German navy) in clearing the Danube of aerial mines.

Order of battle (1 April 1940)

- Patrol Boat Regiment (Budapest)
  - I Group
  - II Group
- River Security Regiment (Újvidék (Novi Sad) after April 1941)
  - 1 Battalion
  - 2 Battalion
  - 3 Battalion

Commanders

- Olaf Richard Wulff (10 March 1920 – 30 April 1933)
- Ferenc Galántai Hild (1 May 1933 – 30 April 1934)
- Richárd Dietrich (1 May 1934 – 30 April 1938)
- Ármin Bauszern (1 May 1940 – 30 April 1942)
- Captain Guidó Tasnády (1 May 1940 – 30 April 1942)
- Vice-Admiral (Lieutenant-General) Kálmán Hardy (1 May 1942 – 15 October 1944)
- Major-General (Rear-Admiral) Ödön Trunkwalter (16 October 1944 – 8 May 1945)

== Chiefs of the General Staff ==
- Viktor Lorx (1922)
- Kocsárd Janky (1922–30)
- Vilmos Rőder (1930–35)
- József Somkuthy (1935–36)
- Jenő Rátz (1936–38)
- Lajos Keresztes-Fischer (1938)
- Henrik Werth (1938–41)
- Ferenc Szombathelyi (1941–44)
- János Vörös (1944)
- Károly Beregfy (1944–45)

== Commanders-in-Chief ==
- Pál Nagy (1922–25)
- Kocsárd Janky (1925–30)
- Kamilló Kárpáthy (1930–35)
- István Shvoy (1935–36)
- Hugó Sónyi (1936–40)

== See also ==
- Hungary in World War II
- First Army (Hungary)
- Royal Hungarian Air Force
- Royal Hungarian Gendarmerie
- Military ranks of the Kingdom of Hungary
- Second Army (Hungary)
- Third Army (Hungary)
- Waffen-SS foreign volunteers and conscripts#List by nation and unit

== Literature ==
- Nigel Thomas, László Pál Szabó: The Royal Hungarian Army in World War II, Osprey Publishing, 2008. ISBN 978-1-84603324-7.
- Sándor Szakály: Honvédség és tisztikar 1919–1947, ISTER Kiadó, Budapest, 2002. ISBN 963-9-243671.
