= Dezső László =

Hungarian general (1893–1949)

- László Dezső
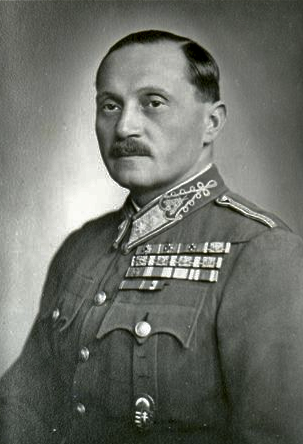
- Born: 23 July 1894; Budapest, Austria-Hungary
- Died: 8 June 1949 (aged 54); Budapest, Second Hungarian Republic
- Military career
- Allegiance: Austria-Hungary (until 1918); Hungary
- Branch: Austro-Hungarian Army; Royal Hungarian Army
- Service years: 1911–1945
- Rank: Vezérezredes (Colonel General)
- Conflicts: World War I World War II: Siege of Budapest

Colonel General Vitéz Dezső László (Hungarian pronunciation: [ˈdɛʒø ˈviteːz ˈlaːslo], 23 July 1894, Lovászpatona, – 8 June 1949, Budapest) was a captain during World War I and general during World War II. After the war, he was first sentenced to 15 years in prison by the National Council of People's Courts on charges of war crimes. Later, following a retrial, he was sentenced to death and executed by the People's Republic of Hungary in 1949.

After graduating from the cadet school, he was promoted to ensign in 1911. In the First World War, he served in the rank of first lieutenant on the Serbian front, the Italian front and the Eastern front. At the end of the war, he was an Italian prisoner of war, and after his release in 1919, he became a staff officer of the Hungarian National Army. He graduated from the military academy in 1920-21 and served in various staff positions. Between 1921 and 1925, he was a junior officer in Várpalota. From May 1936, he was the head of the 1st Department of the Chief of Staff. From February 1, 1937, he was the chief of staff of the 1st Mixed Brigade, then again from November 1, 1938, he was the head of the 1st Department of the Chief of Staff. Between 1941 and 1943, he was the commander of the Ludovica Military Academy, then in the rank of Lieutenant General. He was the commander of the 7th (Sopron) Light Division fighting on the Eastern Front in the Soviet Union until August 12, 1942.

After the Arrow Party takeover of power, Ferenc Szálasi appointed him commander of the First Hungarian Army, and on November 1 he received the rank of Colonel General. He remained in this position until the end of the war, when he was captured by the Americans in April 1945.

After the war, he was extradited to Hungary, where the People's court sentenced him to 15 years in prison in 1946. After the communist takeover, he was sentenced to death with a retrial, but was recommended for a presidential pardon, which was rejected by President Árpád Szakasits. He was executed on June 8, 1949.

After the End of communism in Hungary, in 1999, the Supreme Court acquitted him of the crime.

== Awards and decorations ==

1st row	Order of Merit of the Kingdom of Hungary Commander's Cross with Star	Order of Merit of the Kingdom of Hungary Commander's Cross on war ribbon	Order of Merit of the Kingdom of Hungary Officer's Cross	Military Merit Cross 3rd Class with war decoration and swords
2nd row	Silver Military Merit Medal on war ribbon with swords	Silver Military Merit Medal on war ribbon with swords	Bronze Military Merit Medal on war ribbon with swords	Bronze Military Merit Medal on war ribbon with swords
3rd row	Hungarian Bronze Military Merit Medal on war ribbon	Karl Troop Cross	Hungarian World War I Commemorative Medal	Long Service Crosses for Officers 1st class
4th row	Order of the German Eagle	Order of the Crown of Italy Commander's Cross	Iron Cross 1st Class (1939–1945)	Iron Cross 2nd Class (1939–1945)
Badge	Knight's Cross of the Iron Cross (3 March 1945)			
Badge	Badge of the Order of Vitéz			

Military offices
Preceded by Lieutenant-General Béla Miklós	Commander of the Hungarian First Army; 16 October 1944 – 8 May 1945	Succeeded by none
