= Géza Lakatos =

Former Prime Minister of Hungary

Vitéz Géza Lakatos de Csíkszentsimon
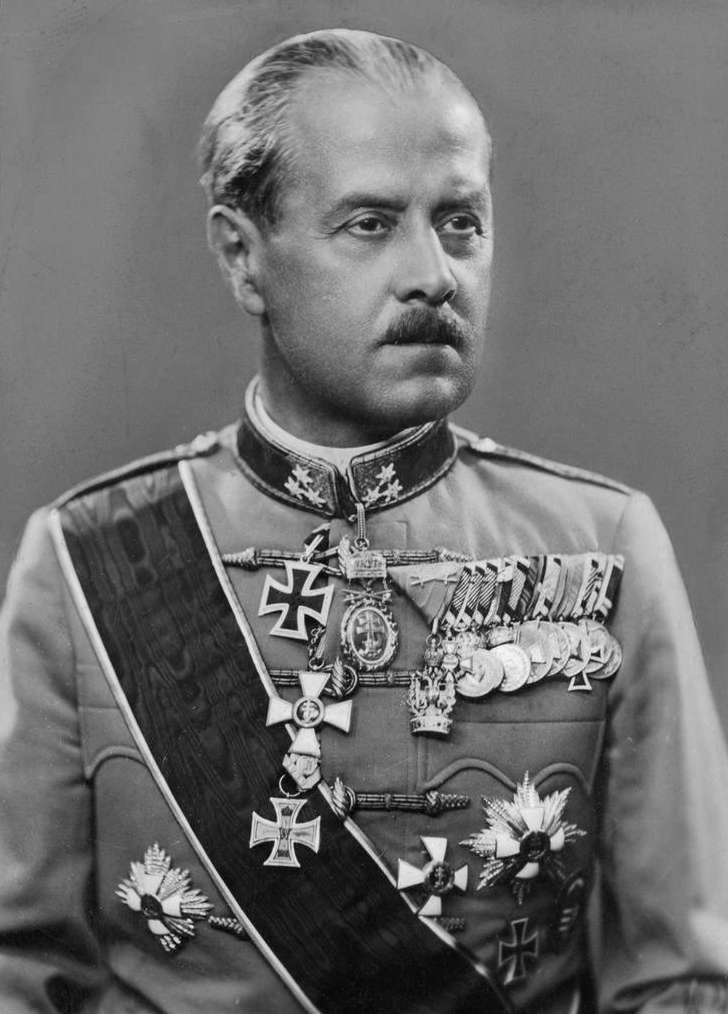
- Lakatos in 1944

Prime Minister of Hungary
- In office 29 August 1944 – 16 October 1944
- Regent: Miklós Horthy
- Preceded by: Döme Sztójay
- Succeeded by: Ferenc Szálasi (as Leader of the Nation)

Personal details
- Born: 30 April 1890 Budapest, Austria-Hungary
- Died: 21 May 1967 (aged 77) Adelaide, South Australia, Australia
- Party: Independent
- Profession: Politician

Géza Lakatos de Csíkszentsimon (Hungarian title/name: "Vitéz lófő csíkszentsimoni Lakatos Géza"; in German: Geza Ritter Lakatos, Edler von Csikszentsimon) (30 April 1890 – 21 May 1967) was a colonel general in the Hungarian Army during World War II who served briefly as Prime Minister of Hungary, under regent Miklós Horthy from 29 August 1944, until 15 October 1944.

== Officer ==
Lakatos graduated at Ludovica Military Academy. He was a military attaché in Prague from 1928 to 1934. In 1941, he was one of the leaders of the Carpathian Group sent to fight in the Soviet Union. Lakatos later wrote that the soldiers under his command "headed off to war with no great enthusiasm." On 5 August 1943 he succeeded vitéz Gusztáv Jány as commander of the Second Army. On 1 April 1944 he was appointed commander of the 1st Hungarian Army, but this was only until 15 May 1944.

In June 1944, the former prime minister István Bethlen advised the regent of Hungary, Miklós Horthy, that he should sack the current prime minister, Döme Sztójay, and replace him with Lakatos. Bethlen stated that Lakatos was the ideal man to sign an armistice with the Allies because he was obscure enough that replacing Sztójay with him would not create any suspicions in Berlin while at the same time Lakatos was loyal enough to sign an armistice. Most of the Honved generals were radicals, but Bethlen knew that Lakatos was one of the few conservative Honved generals, which made him the ideal man to sign an armistice as the Germans would probably regard Lakatos as just another radical general.

== Prime Minister ==
On 23 August 1944, King Michael of Romania dismissed his prime minister, Marshal Ion Antonescu, signed an armistice with the Allies, and declared war on Germany and Hungary. The defection of Romania undermined the entire German position in the Balkans, cut the Reich off from its principal source of oil, and led to a joint Soviet-Romanian force invading northern Transylvania, which Hungary had annexed under the Second Vienna Award of 1940. In reward for defecting from the Axis to the Allied camp, King Michael was promised that Romania would recover northern Transylvania after the Allied victory, which caused much alarm in Budapest. On 25 August 1944, at a meeting attended by Horthy, Bethlen and Lakatos, it was decided that now was the time to sack Sztójay. Bethlen argued that now was not time to sign an armistice, but to start preparing for an armistice, the first step which would be replacing Sztójay with Lakatos. On 28 August 1944, Lakatos was introduced to SS-Brigadefuhrer Edmund Veesenmayer, the German Minister Plenipotentiary in Budapest. Veesenmayer was a bully who took a sadistic pleasure out of humiliating Horthy by viciously berating him. At the introduction, Lakatos told Horthy not to speak to Veesenmayer and instead stood up for the regent, saying it was shameful that Veesenmayer treated Horthy in such a cruel fashion. Veesenmayer wanted Lakatos to include the anti-Semitic radical László Endre in his government, which Lakatos refused. However, Lakatos did agree to keep the Agricultural minister Béla Jurcsek and the Finance minister Lajos Reményi-Schneller in his cabinet, both of whom worked as spies for Germany and kept Veesenmayer well informed about what being discussed in the cabinet. Lakatos headed a techocratic cabinet with half his ministers being generals and the other half being civil servants.

In August 1944 supporters of Lakatos and Horthy, armed with one tank, overthrew the German-installed government of Döme Sztójay. Lakatos's military government (also called shadow-army, since they operated in complete secrecy) stopped the deportation of Hungarian Jews, with acting Interior Minister Béla Horváth ordering Hungarian gendarmes to use deadly force against any deportation effort. Lakatos also reopened peace talks with the Allies that had previously been begun by Miklós Kállay. He even went as far as to begin talks with the Soviets. On 6 September 1944, Lakatos informed Horthy that the Red Army had broken through the German-Hungarian lines in the Carpathian mountains of Transylvania and would soon be on the Great Hungarian Plain. As such, Lakatos stated a decision about whatever to sign an armistice was needed immediately. The politicians from northern Transylvania such as Bela Teleki and Dániel Bánffy tended to be the ones most forceful in demanding an armistice such it was their only hope that northern Transylvania might stay with Hungary after the war and tended to be lobby Horthy and Lakatos most strongly to sign an armistice.

On 7 September 1944, Lakatos first raised the question of an armistice at the council of ministers. Both Jurcsek and Reményi-Schneller were violently opposed to an armistice and promptly informed Veesenmayer that the subject of an armistice had been broached. The Defense Minister Lajos Csatay put forward a compromise, to make an impossible request of Adolf Hitler, namely to send five panzer divisions to Hungary within the next 24 hours or else Hungary would sign an armistice. Lakatos embraced Csatay's idea and made the request, which Veesenmayer on behalf of Hitler promptly accepted, through he later said it would take some time to send the promised panzer divisions. Lakatos later admitted that this was his worst mistake, writing: "With this we delayed the step for an armistice. At the same time we drew the Germans' attention to our preparations. This decided our fate. Militarily we did not get serious assistance, while more and more German troops were brought into the capital and surroundings...they armed the Arrow Cross and prepared them so that with the first possible instance power would be given to Szálasi and comrades. At the time I did not see this clearly...Now of course I know, that in that moment the scales were tipped".

On 10 September 1944, Horthy called a meeting of the Crown Council that was attended by all the senior political and military elites of Hungary. Besides for Horthy, the Crown Council meeting was attended by Lakatos, Bethlen, Csatay along with Foreign Minister Gusztáv Hennyey, Count Móric Esterházy, General János Vörös, the former prime minister Count Gyula Károlyi, General Vilmos Rőder, Kálmán Kánya, Baron Zsigmond Perényi, General István Náday, Baron Dániel Bánffy, Bela Teleki, and General Hugó Sónyi. Lakatos spoke first about the political situation while Vörös spoke about the military situation. Bethlen as the elder statesman gave the most important speech, saying that the war was lost and to continue the war would result in the destruction of Hungary along with pointless loss of life, which led him to advocate signing an armistice immediately. By contrast, the majority of the Honved generals were opposed to seeking an armistice, saying to sign an armistice would mean a Communist regime in Hungary and it was better to fight on as an ally of Nazi Germany and see Hungary destroyed rather than have a Communist regime. The generals also argued that Horthy had a duty as a Hungarian officer and a gentleman to tell Hitler first about signing an armistice, and to sign an armistice without informing Hitler first would be a deeply dishonorable thing to do. After five hours of debate, the Crown Council meeting ended with the decision to seek an armistice, but also to inform Hitler in advance.

On 11 September 1944, Lakatos informed the Council of Ministers of what the Crown Council had decided and was faced with a cabinet revolt as almost his entire cabinet rejected the idea of an armistice with the overwhelming feeling that to see Hungary destroyed in the war was far better than having a Communist regime. With the Council of Ministers opposed to an armistice, Horthy decided to sign an armistice on his authority. Horthy was still opposed to an armistice with the Soviet Union and still hoped for an Anglo-American occupation of Hungary. Horthy dispatched General Náday to Italy on 20 September 1944 where he met with Field Marshal Henry Maitland Wilson, the Allied commander in the Mediterranean theater. Wilson told Náday that there was no prospect of his forces in Italy reaching Hungary via Austria anytime soon and admonished him for seeking to sign an armistice without the Soviet Union. Náday was told that the Hungarians could not pick and chose which one of the Allies they wished to sign an armistice with and that they could either sign an armistice with all of the "Big Three" Allied powers, namely the United States, the United Kingdom and the Soviet Union or none at all. It was only on 22 September 1944 after Náday reported what Wilson had said that Horthy finally accepted he would have to sign an armistice with the Soviet Union. On the same day, the Red Army entered the Great Hungarian Plain, which further reinforced the point that an armistice was necessary with the Soviets.

On 28 September 1944, a three-man delegation led by General Gábor Faragho, the former military attaché in Moscow who spoke fluent Russian, left for Moscow to sign an armistice. The armistice talks in Moscow, which started on 1 October 1944, dragged on for ten days. Faragho had instructions to only sign a "preliminary armistice", which would had stopped the Red Army's advance into Hungary with the actual armistice to end the war to be signed at a later day. Horthy still held to the hope that the Allied armies in Italy might break out into Austria and hence reach Hungary. The Soviet delegation led by General Vasily Kuznetsov wanted an actual armistice on the principle of unconditional surrender, for Hungary to declare war on Germany and to allow the Red Army transit rights to reach Austria, which at the time was part of Germany. On 5 October 1944, General Aleksei Antonov told Faragho that his government was primarily interested in crossing Hungary to reach Germany and that could be best achieved with the co-operation of the Hungarian government, hence the demand for a "preliminary armistice" was unacceptable. Faragho also had orders to secure a promise that Hungary could keep northern Transylvania after the war, which also rejected by the Soviet delegation who said that northern Transylvania was going to be returned to Romania to reward King Michael for signing an armistice first. On 8 October 1944, the American ambassador in Moscow, W. Averell Harriman, and the British ambassador in Moscow, Archibald Clark Kerr were brought into the talks and supported the Soviet position on an armistice. The British prime minister, Winston Churchill and Foreign Secretary Anthony Eden were in Moscow at the time for a summit with Joseph Stalin, and both Churchill and Eden came out in support of the Soviet terms, through Faragho noted that the on-going summit led to the Soviets wanting to be perceived as generous victors. In an attempt to appear magnanimous to the British delegation in Moscow, the Soviets wanted the armistice to be primarily military and there was no demand that Horthy abdicate or that Hungarian Communists be allowed to join the Hungarian government. The Soviet armistice terms did not touch upon the political structure of Hungary, through Faragho noted with the Red Army occupying Hungary the Soviets could always impose a Communist regime later on. On 9 October 1944, Horthy agreed to accept the Soviet terms and the next day told Lakatos of his decision. On 11 October 1944, Faragho and the Soviet Foreign Commissar Vyacheslav Molotov signed an armistice, which was supposed to come into effect on 20 October 1944. On the same day, Veesenmayer met with Ferenc Szálasi to tell him his government had decided to depose Horthy for signing an armistice and to prepare the Arrow Cross Party for a coup d'etat, which would be happening very soon.

== Operation Panzerfaust ==
On 14 October 1944, Horthy decided to move forward the day the armistice would come into effect and duly sent off a letter to Hitler telling him what was about to happen. The same day, Horthy told Lakatos that the armistice would be coming into effect, leading to the prime minister to protest he did not have enough time to prepare, saying he did not expect the Germans to take the news well and he was not certain if all the Honved generals would accept an armistice. Lakatos was opposed to Horthy's decision to move forward on bringing the armistice into effect, saying he should wait until 20 October as he needed more time to secure the loyalty of his fellow Honved generals. Horthy had planned to give a radio address the next day announcing the armistice and at the insistence of Lakatos deleted the sentence "from this day Hungary considers herself to be at war with Germany". On 15 October 1944, Horthy tried to force the Germans out entirely and concluded an armistice with the Allies. However, when Horthy announced this in a nationwide radio address, the Germans launched Operation Panzerfaust, kidnapped Horthy's son, Miklós Horthy, Jr., and Horthy surrendered to them. The far-right Arrow Cross Party, backed by the Germans, immediately staged a coup and took full control of the government.

On the morning of 15 October 1944, a team of SS commandos led by Otto Skorzeny kidnapped Miklós Horthy, Jr. after a gunbattle with his bodyguards. After several of his bodyguards were killed in the shoot-out, Horthy Jr. was taken prisoner, beaten by the SS, and then wrapped up in a carpet and put on the first flight to Germany. At 11 am that day, Lakatos met with Horthy at a meeting of the Crown Council. The regent was clearly upset with the news his son was now a hostage, but decided to announce the armistice. Lakatos submitted his resignation as prime minister, saying he needed to consult Parliament. Horthy accepted the resignation and immediately reappointed Lakatos as prime minister, saying that as the Supreme War Lord he had the right to sign an armistice. The meeting was broken up when Veesenmayer unexpectedly arrived at the Royal Castle. What followed was an angry scene as both Horthy and Lakatos shouted at Veesenmayer for kidnapping Miklós Horthy, Jr. as a way to stop the armistice. Veesenmayer asked for the radio announcement to be delayed until Horthy and Lakatos had met with his superior, Rudolf Rahn, who just arrived in Budapest. Much to the astonishment of Horthy and Horthy's family who were to comfort him after his son had been kidnapped, Lakatos agreed to this demand, saying that Horthy should announce nothing until he had met Rahn. The prime minister believed that this was the best chance of saving Horthy Jr.

Lakatos was overruled and the announcement went out at about 1 pm. Horthy's speech with the line that Latatos had deleted, namely "from this day Hungary considers herself at war with Germany" confused everyone who had heard it. The speech as delivered made it sound like that Horthy was merely saying he wanted to open armistice talks with the Soviet Union instead of saying an armistice was now in effect. The majority of the Honved officers did not rally to the Regent. The few who did such as General Béla Miklós defected over to the Red Army to avoid being arrested by their own officers or were arrested attempting to defect over to the Red Army in the case of General Lajos Dálnoki-Veress. Other officers such as General Béla Aggteleky and General Kálman Hardy were arrested by their own officers at gunpoint as traitors when they announced the order to stop fighting. At 3 pm, the chief of the general staff, General Vörös, sabotaged the armistice by issuing a "clarification" to all Honved officers, saying that Horthy had merely said he was opening armistice talks and that the Honved was to continue to fight against the Red Army until an armistice was signed, which put an end to attempt to stop the fighting. All over western and central Hungary, Wehrmacht, SS and Arrow Cross units took control of key public buildings with for the most part no resistance from the Honved, the police or the gendarmerie.

Horthy called a meeting of the Crown Council at about 2:30 pm and was surprised to hear the radio carried an announcement by Szálasi who was giving a "war command to the armed nation" to continue the war and was calling himself "the leader of the nation". By the evening, Horthy had learned that only the 300 or so men guarding the Royal Castle were still under his command while the majority of the Honved had rallied to Szálasi. Lakatos and the Foreign Minister Hennyey arrived at the Royal Castle that night to tell Horthy the Council of Ministers and the majority of the Honved had rejected the armistice. The prime minister stated that Veesenmayer was willing to guarantee the safety of Horthy and his entire family if the regent abdicated and recognised Szálasi as the "leader of the nation", an offer that Horthy rejected. General Antal Vattay of the military bureau woke Horthy up at midnight to tell him of the offer, which Horthy rejected, but Vattay reported to Lakatos had been accepted. Lakatos spent the rest of the night negotiating with Veesenmayer, trying to persuade the SS to not execute Horthy Jr. and storm the Royal Castle. At about 4 am, Horthy was awoken again and told that the Royal Castle would soon be assaulted. At about 5 am, Horthy was dressed and had loaded his pistol when Lakatos and Veesenmayer arrived at the Royal Castle in a German military car. Lakatos told Horthy that he had a written promise that Horthy Jr. would not be executed and that Horthy would be spared if he surrendered. Veesenmayer added that Horthy had 12 minutes to accept this offer or else the SS would storm the Royal Castle. At this point, Horthy surrendered and signed the instrument of abdication. As Horthy and Lakatos were taken away in a German military car, shooting broken out in the background as some of the soldiers guarding the Royal Castle were not aware of the regent's surrender and resisted when the Germans attempted to take possession of the castle. Lakatos was forced to resign that day, and was imprisoned by the Germans in Sopronkőhida. After that he was interned into Sopron.

== Later Career ==
Following the Soviet occupation of Hungary, Lakatos was interrogated several times in Kiskőrös. He was released from prison in January 1946 and thereafter appeared as a witness in war crime trials against the Arrow Cross Party and other pro-Nazi former officials before the People's Tribunal of Budapest. Along with Miklós Kállay, Lakatos was one of the few prime ministers from the Horthy era who were not prosecuted for war crimes under the new regime. In the forthcoming years he lived in his estate in Érd. His military pension was revoked by the Communist authorities and his lands were also confiscated in 1949. Following that he moved to Budapest where he worked as a book illustrator and silk painter, and lived in poor financial circumstances. His daughter emigrated to Australia in 1956, when the failed Hungarian Revolution briefly allowed people to emigrate from Hungary. Following his wife's death in 1965, the authorities permitted Lakatos to travel to Adelaide where his daughter lived since 1957. He died there two years later, in 1967.

== Awards and decorations ==

1st row	Order of Merit of the Kingdom of Hungary Grand Cross on war ribbon with swords	Golden Military Merit Medal on war ribbon with swords	Order of Merit of the Kingdom of Hungary Commander's Cross with Star	Order of Merit of the Kingdom of Hungary Commander's Cross
2nd row	Order of Merit of the Kingdom of Hungary Bronze Cross	Order of the Iron Crown (Austria) 3rd Class with war decoration and swords	Military Merit Cross 3rd Class with war decoration and swords	Silver Military Merit Medal on war ribbon with swords
3rd row	Bronze Military Merit Medal on war ribbon with swords	Hungarian Bronze Military Merit Medal on war ribbon with swords	Fire Cross 2nd class with wreath	Wound Medal (Austria-Hungary)
4th row	National Defence Cross	Hungarian World War I Commemorative Medal	Long Service Crosses for Officers 1st class	Long Service Crosses for Officers 2nd class
5th row	Long Service Crosses for Officers 3rd class	Transylvania Commemorative Medal	Marian Cross	Knight's Cross of the Iron Cross
6th row	Iron Cross 1st Class (1914) with 1939 clasp	Iron Cross 2nd Class (1914) with 1939 clasp	Bulgarian World War I Commemorative Medal	War Commemorative Medal (Austria)
Badge	Badge of the Order of Vitéz			

== Books ==
- Cornelius, Deborah S. (2011). Hungary in World War II Caught in the Cauldron. New York: Fordham University Press. ISBN 978-0-8232-3773-9.
- Fellgiebel, Walther-Peer (2000) [1986]. Die Träger des Ritterkreuzes des Eisernen Kreuzes 1939–1945 — Die Inhaber der höchsten Auszeichnung des Zweiten Weltkrieges aller Wehrmachtteile [The Bearers of the Knight's Cross of the Iron Cross 1939–1945 — The Owners of the Highest Award of the Second World War of all Wehrmacht Branches] (in German). Friedberg, Germany: Podzun-Pallas. ISBN 978-3-7909-0284-6.
- C A Macartney: October Fifteenth – A History of Modern Hungary, 1929–1945, 2 vols, Edinburgh University Press 1956–7.
- Lakatos Géza: Ahogyan én láttam, Budapest, Európa, 1992.
- Géza Lakatos: As I saw it: the tragedy of Hungary, Englewood, N.J. : Universe Publishing, 1993.
- Ignác Romsics: Hungary in the Twentieth Century, Budapest: Corvina, 1999.
- Romsics, Ignac (2017). "Hungary". In David Stahel (ed.). Joining Hitler's Crusade European Nations and the Invasion of the Soviet Union, 1941. Cambridge: Cambridge University Press. pp. 79–106. ISBN 978-1-316-51034-6.
- Kovács, Attila Ótott (2006). Die ungarischen Inhaber des Ritterkreuzes des Eisernen Kreuzes. Ranis: Scherzers Militaer-Verl. ISBN 978-3-938845-02-8.

Political offices
Preceded by Döme Sztójay	Prime Minister of Hungary; 1944	Succeeded by Ferenc Szálasi
Military offices
Preceded by Lieutenant-General Gusztáv Jány	Commander of the Hungarian Second Army; 5 August 1943 – 1 April 1944	Succeeded by Lieutenant-General Lajos Veress
Preceded by Lieutenant-General István Náday	Commander of the Hungarian First Army; 1 April 1944 – 15 May 1944	Succeeded by Lieutenant-General Károly Beregfy
