= First Army (Hungary) =

Field army of Royal Hungarian Army

The Hungarian First Army was a field army of the Royal Hungarian Army that saw action during World War II.

== Commanders ==
- Lieutenant-General Vilmos Nagy - March 1, 1940 – February 1, 1941
- Lieutenant-General István Schweitzer - February 1, 1941 – August 1, 1942
- Lieutenant-General István Náday - August 1, 1942 – April 1, 1944
- Lieutenant-General Géza Lakatos - April 1, 1944 – May 15, 1944
- Lieutenant-General Károly Beregfy - May 15, 1944 – August 1, 1944
- Lieutenant-General Ferenc Farkas de Kisbarnak - July 25, 1944 – August 1, 1944 (acting)
- Lieutenant-General Béla Miklós von Dalnoki - August 1, 1944 – October 16, 1944
- Lieutenant-General Dezső László - October 16, 1944 – May 8, 1945

== Background ==
Under Hungarian Regent, Admiral Miklós Horthy, Hungary was an Axis state at the beginning of the European conflict. On 1 March 1940, the Hungarian Army formed three field armies. All three Hungarian armies saw action on the Eastern Front against the Red Army. Unlike the Hungarian Third Army which took part in the invasion of Yugoslavia (1941) and the Hungarian Second Army that fought at the Battle of Stalingrad (1942), the Hungarian First Army did not see much combat at the start of the war.

The troops of the Hungarian First Army, like all Hungarian troops, were part of the one-million-plus non-German Axis troops on the Eastern Front. While the majority of these Axis troops were Romanian, there were also significant contingents of Hungarians, Finns, Lithuanians, Latvians, Estonians, Italians, Slovaks, Croatians, Frenchmen, Danes, Norwegians, Belgians, and Spaniards.

== Occupation duties ==
The first commander of the Hungarian First Army was Lieutenant-General (or Altábornagy according to the Hungarian army rank) Vilmos Nagy. After 30 August 1940, under Nagy, the Hungarian First Army took part in Hungary's annexation and occupation of northern Transylvania. This region of Romania was awarded to Hungary as a condition of the Second Vienna Award.

From 1940 to mid-1944, the Hungarian First Army saw little action other than occupation duties.

== Action ==
By 30 April 1944, the Hungarian First Army was used to bolster Army Group South Ukraine. This army group was pushed back during the Battle of Târgul Frumos in May 1944. The Hungarians were placed in defensive positions north of the Romanian Fourth Army and south of Army Group North Ukraine.

From 13 July to 29 July 1944, the Hungarian First Army fought against the Soviet Lvov-Sandomierz Offensive. At this time the Hungarians were attached to the German First Panzer Army commanded by Colonel-General (Generaloberst) Gotthard Heinrici, which, in turn, was part of Army Group North Ukraine.

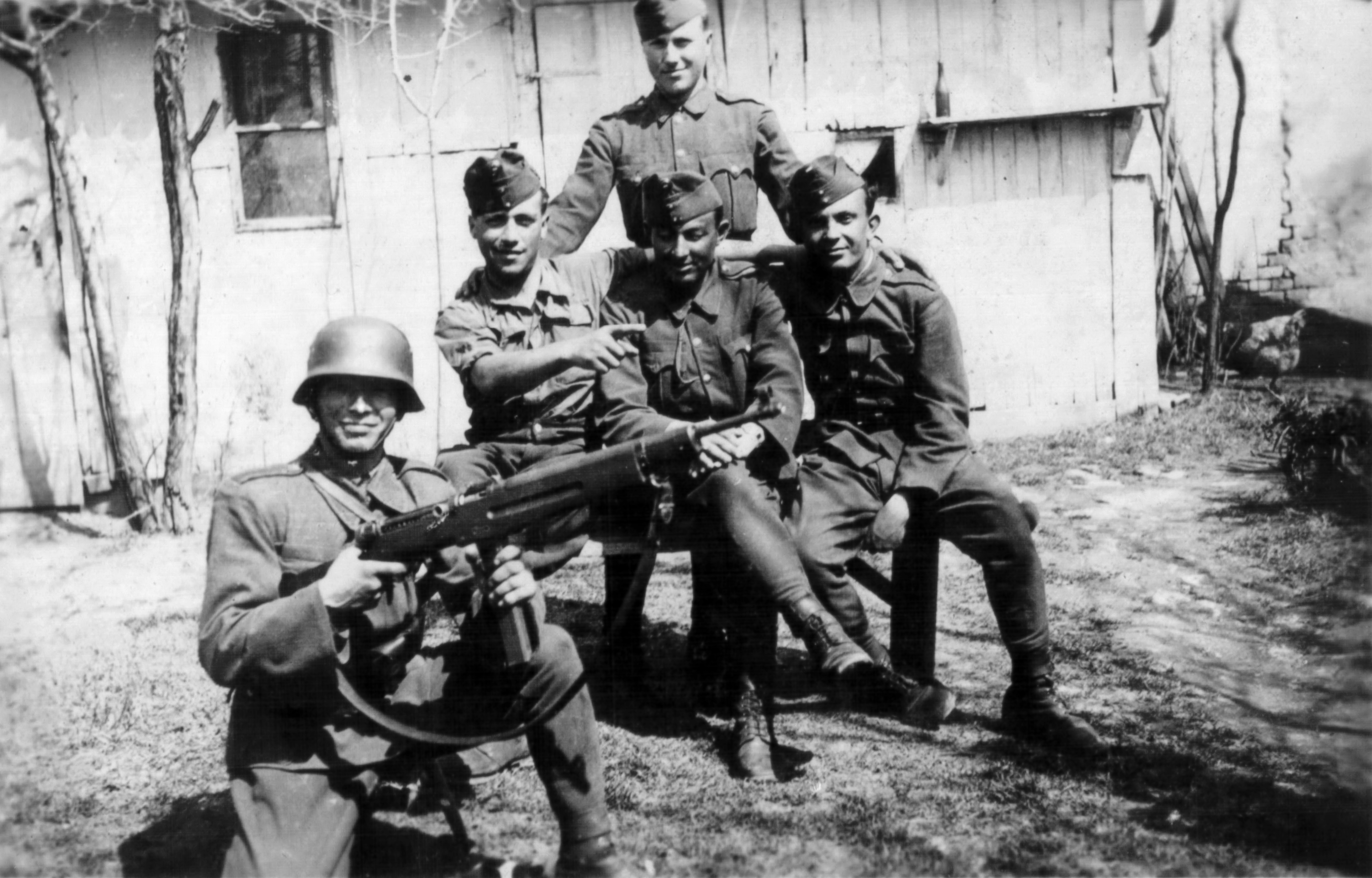
Hungarian soldiers in the Carpathians in 1944, near the village of Volosyanka

Later in 1944, Soviet troops entered Romania, Bulgaria, and Hungary. The Romanians capitulated. The Bulgarians capitulated. The Hungarians tried to capitulate twice, but unsuccessfully. In the end, the Hungarian First Army continued its precarious existence.

On 28 December, a newly formed Hungarian government, under acting Prime Minister Béla Miklós, officially declared war against Nazi Germany. But the Germans and the pro-German Hungarians in Hungary fought on against the Soviets. However, there are indications that some elements of the Hungarian First Army went over to the Soviets at about this time. Béla Miklós had been the commander of the Hungarian First Army from 1 August 1944 to 16 October 1944.

Between 1 January and 16 February 1945, most of what remained of the Hungarian First Army was overrun, bypassed, or destroyed about 200 kilometers north of Budapest when the Soviet 40th Army advanced through the area. But, even after this, the Hungarian First Army did not cease to exist. The remnants fought on as an attachment to Heinrici's German First Panzer Army. Fighting as they went, they moved progressively westward into Slovakia. The army was not officially disbanded until 8 May 1945, the end of the war. That is when the last commander of the Hungarian First Army, Lieutenant-General László Dezső, surrendered.

== See also ==
- Hungary in World War II
- Military of Hungary – 1940/45
- Second Vienna Award – 1940
- Lvov-Sandomierz Offensive – 1944
- Battle of Budapest – 1944–45
- Eastern Front (World War II)
- Second Army (Hungary)
- Third Army (Hungary)
- Gyorshadtest
- Szent László Infantry Division
