= István Schweitzer =

- Born: 1887
- Died: 1981 (aged 93–94)
- Military career
- Allegiance: Hungary
- Rank: Lieutenant-General
- Commands: Hungarian First Army
- Conflicts: World War II

István Schweitzer (1887–1981) was a Hungarian military officer, who served as commander of the Hungarian First Army during the Second World War.

Military offices
Preceded by Lieutenant-General Vilmos Nagy	Commander of the Hungarian First Army; 1 February 1941 – 1 August 1942	Succeeded by Lieutenant-General István Náday
