= István Náday =

- Born: 20 June 1888; Nagymihály, Kingdom of Hungary
- Died: 30 January 1954 (aged 65); Balassagyarmat, People's Republic of Hungary
- Military career
- Allegiance: Austria-Hungary; Hungarian Soviet Republic; Kingdom of Hungary
- Service years: 1908-1944
- Rank: Lieutenant-General
- Commands: Hungarian First Army
- Conflicts: World War I; Hungarian-Romanian War; World War II

István Náday (20 June 1888 – 30 January 1954) was a Hungarian military officer, who served as commander of the Hungarian First Army during the Second World War. He was appointed an infantry lieutenant at the Ludovika Academy in 1908, and served in the Red Army in the First World War. After the war, he was a military academy professor, and worked his way up to general, then eventually commander-in-chief.

On 19 March 1944, when Germany launched Operation Margarethe and occupied Hungary, the prime minister Miklós Kállay summoned him along with János Vörös and Károly Beregfy to the prime minister's office to ask the assembled if were possible for Hungary to resist the invasion. All three generals stated that resistance was futile and advised Kállay to accept the occupation. When Kállay kept pressing in demanding resistance, Náday was the only one of the generals who was willing to obey Kállay's orders as both Vörös and flatly refused to obey an order to resist the invasion. After the occupation, Náday resigned rather than face the dishonorable discharge proceedings started against him. On 10 September 1944, Náday attended a meeting of the Crown Council where signing an armistice with the Soviet Union was discussed.

In September 1944, the Regent of Hungary, Admiral Miklós Horthy, sent Náday to a peace mission to Italy. On the evening of 20 September 1944, Náday along with a British POW, Colonel Charles T. Howie, who had escaped from a POW camp in Germany, went to see Horthy at the Royal Castle, who told them that they were go to Italy with orders to sign an armistice with the United States and the United Kingdom, but under no conditions were to sign an armistice with the Soviet Union. Together with Náday's pilot, János Majoros, the duo took off from an airfield outside of Budapest on 22 September to fly to Foggia. With Colonel Howie as his contact, Náday was able to see Field Marshal Henry Maitland Wilson, the Supreme Allied Commander in the Mediterranean theater of operations. Wilson rejected Náday's peace offer, saying that the Hungarians could not pick and chose which of the Allies to sign an armistice with. Náday was told he could sign an armistice with all of the "Big Three" Allied powers namely the Soviet Union, the United States and the United Kingdom and none at all. A dejected Náday returned to Budapest to tell Horthy that he must sign an armistice with the Soviet Union or else see Hungary destroyed in the war.

== Books ==
- Cornelius, Deborah S (2011). Hungary in World War II: Caught in the Cauldron. New York: Fordham University Press. ISBN 978-0823233441.

Military offices
Preceded by Lieutenant-General István Schweitzer	Commander of the Hungarian First Army; 1 August 1942 – 1 April 1944	Succeeded by Lieutenant-General Géza Lakatos
