= Vilmos Nagy de Nagybaczon =

Royal Hungarian Army general (1884–1976)

Vilmos Nagy
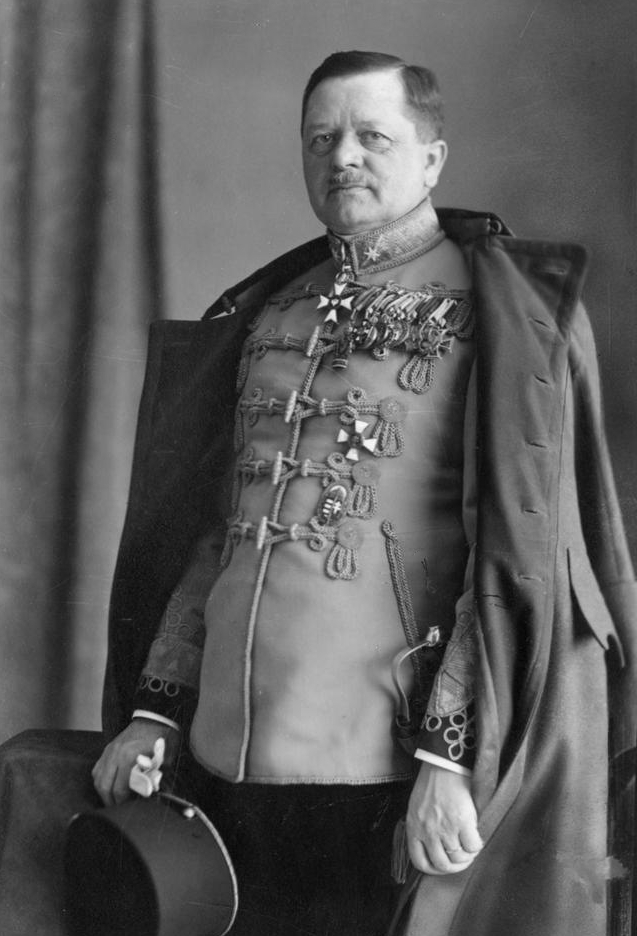
- Born: 30 May 1884; Parajd, Austria-Hungary (now Praid, Romania)
- Died: 21 June 1976 (aged 92); Piliscsaba, People's Republic of Hungary
- Military career
- Allegiance: Austria-Hungary; Hungarian Soviet Republic; Kingdom of Hungary
- Service years: 1909–1944
- Rank: Colonel General
- Unit: Hungarian Army
- Commands: Hungarian First Army
- Conflicts: World War I; World War II

Vilmos Nagy de Nagybaczon (30 May 1884 – 21 June 1976) was a commanding general of the Royal Hungarian Army (1920–1945), Minister of Defence, a military theorist and historian.

== Early life and education ==
Vilmos Nagy was born into a family of Calvinist country nobility of Székely ancestry. His ancestors received their patent of nobility in 1676 from Apafi Mihály I, a ruling prince of Transylvania, and the title of Nagybaczoni (Transl: of Nagybaczon) refers to his ancestral home in Covasna County, Transylvania.

He lost his father, Nagy Zsigmond (Sigmund Nagy), a mining engineer of little means at an early age, and his widowed mother could not provide for the children's education. Thus, with no other options, together with his brother Béla he decided to pursue a military career.

In 1902, he graduated with honours from the Kun Kollégium high school in Szászváros, and his exemplary record gained him tuition free admittance, with continuing financial support, to the prestigious Ludovica Military Academy.

== Military career ==
After his graduation in 1905, he elected to serve with the Royal Hungarian Army rather than joining the Imperial Austro-Hungarian Army. This was considered to be a career limiting choice, since there were fewer possibilities for advancement.

His outstanding service surpassed that of his fellow officers and four years after receiving his first commission, he completed the Imperial War College in Vienna (1909–1912). Thus, in his thirtieth year, he was appointed to the Imperial General Staff with the rank of major.

=== World War I and its aftermath ===
As a young Staff officer in World War I, he participated in operations against Serbia, in the battles of the Carpathian front, the breakthrough at Gorlice, and operations in Volhynia.

In 1919, after the end of the war and collapse of the Austro-Hungarian Empire, his extensive military experience and expertise was utilized by the Hungarian Red Army of the Hungarian Soviet Republic and he was again assigned to the General Staff with the rank of major.

=== Between World Wars ===
The career of Major Vilmos Nagy continued its uninterrupted rise following the collapse of the short lived Socialist Republic, as he was reassigned to the general staff of the newly formed Royal Hungarian Army.

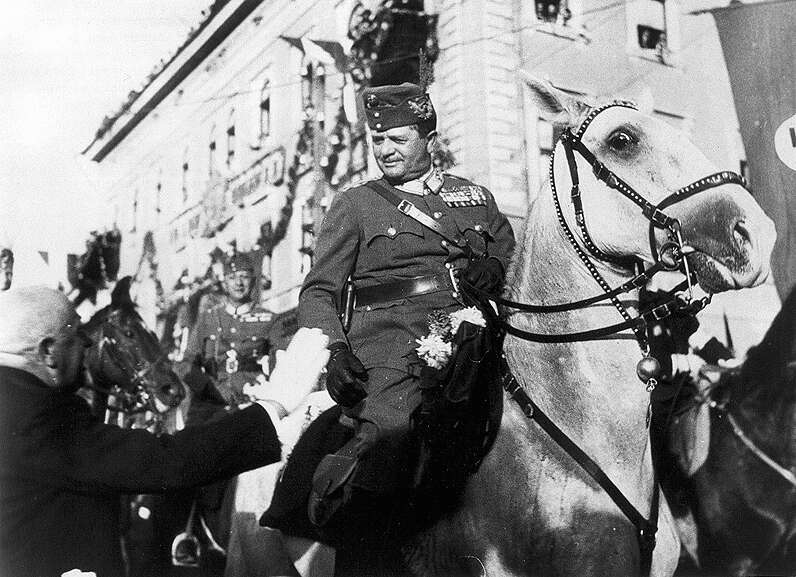
Vilmos Nagy marches to Marosvásárhely on 10 September 1940

Between 1927 and 1931, he served as the commanding officer of the 1st Mounted Infantry. This was followed by his appointment as chief adjutant to the commander in chief of the military forces. On 1 May 1934, he was promoted to colonel, and assigned command of the Quartermaster Corps. Then, on 1 May 1937 he was promoted to brigadier general, and in the following year, was assigned the command of the 1st Mounted Infantry Corps.

Following the First Vienna Award concerning Slovakia, he commanded the forces occupying the city of Košice (Hungarian: Kassa). Within a short while and on a temporary basis, he was assigned to be the Inspector General of the Infantry. Within a year, in March 1940, he was appointed as the commanding officer of the 1st Hungarian Army, and two months later, he was promoted to the rank of major general.

Following the Second Vienna Award, in September 1940, he led the 1st Hungarian Army into the city of Marosvásárhely (Târgu Mureş). His responsibilities included strengthening the borders of the re-conquered territory, and overseeing the distribution of food supplies to the population at large.

In a completely unexpected move on 31 March 1941, the High Command retired him with the rank of lieutenant general, and at this point it seemed that the military career of Vilmos Nagy of Nagybaczon had ended.

== World War II ==
The prime minister, Miklós Kállay had been in conflict with his defense of national defense, Károly Bartha, ever since he had been appointed prime minister in March 1942. Bartha was a minister whom Kállay had inherited from the previous government headed by László Bárdossy and whom he did not want in his cabinet. Kállay had appointed a royal commission in July 1942 into allegations of the mistreatment of the men serving in the Labour service battalions. When the royal commission presented its report in September 1942, it confirmed the rumours that had long been circulating about the labour service battalions, which Kállay used as a reason to sack Bartha and appoint Nagy as the new defense minister. Nagy had been known to disapprove of Bartha's pro-Nazi views and it was for this reason that Kállay decided to make him the new defense minister. On 21 September 1942 the Regent, Miklós Horthy, offered General Nagy the portfolio of the Minister of Defense. In this position, and true to his convictions, Nagy did everything to keep the military out of politics, and struggled to modernize and preserve the remaining Hungarian military stationed at home to prevent the repeat of another debacle which followed the collapse of the Austro-Hungarian Empire in 1918.

Prior to his appointment, the government committed the 2nd Hungarian Army to the Eastern Front, where they eventually met their end by their complete annihilation at Voronezh. While Nagy was unable to bring back the troops from the front, he made every effort to preserve and safeguard the troops back home and ameliorate the conditions of the forced labour battalions. He issued numerous orders for the improvement of their conditions. As part of Operation Blue, the offensive intended to capture the oil fields of the Soviet Caucasus, the elite German 6th Army had been to secure the flank of Army Group South along the river Volga as Army Group South advanced into the Caucasus. The Hungarian 2nd Army had sent east as one of the armies accompanying the 6th Army, which had the duty of securing the flank of the 6th Army, which had assigned the task of capturing the city of Stalingrad (modern Volgograd, Russia) along the banks of the Don river. The deployment of the 2nd Army so far east had imposed serious challenges to Hungarian logistics, and Nagy soon heard a massive number of complaints that the 2nd Army was suffering from shortages of equipment and kit. Nagy announced his intention to visit the 2nd Army in person to inspect the condition of the 2nd Army along with visiting Vinnytsia, the Ukrainian city where Adolf Hitler had set up his headquarters to monitor the Eastern Front.

Before departing for his journey to the German-occupied parts of the Soviet Union, Nagy held a meeting with Kállay at the prime minister's office. Kállay warned Nagy that German-Hungarian relations were in decline with a number of Wehrmacht officers being harshly critical of the performance of the Hungarian Expeditionary Force on the Eastern Front and Hitler openly unhappy that Kállay had refused requests to send the entire Hungarian Jewish population for "resettlement in the East" (i.e the Nazi euphemism for extermination). As always with German-Hungarian relations in World War Two, Kállay was deeply concerned about German-Romanian relations as Marshal Ion Antonescu of Romania was along with Benito Mussolini the only foreign leaders whom Hitler seemingly had any respect for. In addition to the forces which he had used to invade the Soviet Union with in June 1941, Antonescu had committed 16 more Romanian Army divisions to the Eastern Front for the summer 1942 campaign. Antonescu had made it clear right from the moment that he came to power in September 1940 that he was not willing to accept the Second Vienna Award and planned to take back northern Transylvania at the first chance. Kállay told Nagy that he did not want Hungarian soldiers on the Eastern Front, but he had to keep the Hungarian Expeditionary Force deployed on the Eastern Front out of the fear that Hitler would side with Antonescu and give northern Transylvania back to Romania.

Nagy first went to Vinnytsia to see Hitler at his Werwolf headquarters located in a forest just north of Vinnytsia. Hitler told Nagy that he underestimated the Red Army as he expected to defeat the Soviet Union in 1941, but he told Nagy that the 6th Army would soon win the Battle of Stalingrad while the oil fields of the Caucasus would soon be in German hands. Hitler told Nagy that he did not expect the 2nd Army to see any serious fighting, saying that the 2nd Army had only the task of being a in defensive role. Nagy then flew further east to visit the headquarters of the 2nd Army, located in a former Soviet factory in Aleksejevka to see General Gusztáv Jány, the GOC of the 2nd Army. Jány painted a pessimistic picture of the 2nd Army to Nagy, saying that his soldiers were spread out, holding 200 km of the front line; had only 6, 000 rifles; had no modern tanks or anti-tank guns; and had serious shortages of artillery and fodder for the horses. The 2nd Army had no lorries (trucks) and to bring up all of its supplies via wagons pulled by horses, which was why the shortage of fodder was such a major problem. Jány asked Nagy several times to be relieved of the command of the 2nd Army, saying his army would be destroyed if it was faced with a major Soviet offensive, which was refused. Nagy ended his eastern trip by visiting the headquarters of Field Marshal Maximilian von Weichs in Belgorod. He asked Weichs to supply the 2nd Army with modern equipment, only to be told that the advancing as far east as the river Volga had imposed serious challenges for German logistics and as a German field marshal, Weichs felt that his first duty was in supplying German troops with the Hungarians coming at a distant second. Nagy when returned to Budapest, starkly warned both Horthy and Kállay that the 2nd Army should be withdrawn from the Soviet Union, saying the 2nd Army lacked the equipment and kit to fight a modern battle. He was told that there was no possibility of withdrawing the 2nd Army due to political reasons, namely the fear that Hitler would give northern Transylvania back to Romania out of gratitude for Romania's role on the Eastern Front.

Nagy had a reputation within the Honved for "integrity and humanitarianism". Furthermore, as a former Hungarian military attaché to the United Kingdom, he had many British links, which were felt to be useful for making peace with the British. During his visit to the 2nd Army, he personally visited a hospital for sick labour sericemen, and was greatly appalled by the conditions. Nagy found the sick labour servicemen resting on a straw floor and he received the response that the suffering of the sick labour servicemen did not matter because they were Jews. Nagy issued orders that that the men serving in the labour service battalions were to stop being treated as prisoners instead of being fellow Hungarian soldiers; that the men serving in the labour service receive adequate food rations instead of being allowed to stave to death; and that any of the labour servicemen who became seriously ill or unable to work were to be released from the labour service. Nagy admonished several Honved officers for their treatment of the labour service battalions, saying that in several of the labour service battalions that he had seen, the men serving were treated like animals instead of human beings.

Nagy's reforms to the Honved were met with opposition from the officers' corps at the ministry and politicians of the extreme right. His political effectiveness diminished as he sought to curb the military's culture of Antisemitism and the inhumane treatment of the forced labourers. He strenuously objected to the German request of sending 10,000 Jewish forced labourers to the copper mines at Bor, Serbia, and in February 1943, he opposed acquiescing to the German request of sending Hungarian troops to the Balkans.

Due to his position on these issues, he was viewed as increasingly dangerous by his enemies. He was ridiculed, accused of being a 'Jewish lackey' (Zsidóbérenc), of being anti-Axis, and was under constant attack by the extreme political right. Seeing that neither Regent Horthy, nor the Prime Minister Kállay were able or willing to defend him, on 8 June 1943, he submitted his resignation.

He was succeeded by Colonel-In-Chief Lajos Csatay, and the daily press praised the person of the departing minister. On 16 June, the social democratic daily Népszava (Voice of the People) published an exceptionally warm appraisal. Endre Bajcsy-Zsilinszky, in his memoirs on government related matters, he wrote that in his 10 June submission to the Regent, he praised the service of the departing minister. The city of Marosvásárhely named him an honorary citizen but, due to 19 March 1944 occupation of Hungary by the Germans, the ceremony was cancelled.

=== The war's end ===
From behind the scenes, Vilmos Nagy continued to support the efforts of those who wished to achieve a separate peace with the Allies. Hungary lay in the direct path of the Nazi armies retreating from the onslaught of the Red Army and, based on past experience, he foresaw the utter destruction to be visited upon the land and the people as the fighting moved ever closer to the borders of Hungary.

The extreme right was not satisfied with distancing him from a position of power and authority, and after the government's takeover by the fascist Arrow Cross, on 16 November 1944, the gendarmerie (csendőrök) arrested him at his Piliscsaba home. After being held for two days at Hotel Lomnic on Svábhegy, which served as a prison facility of the Arrow Cross, together with his brother Béla and other prisoners, he was transferred to the prison in Sopronköhida.

As the Red Army approached, the prisoners, under the command of lieutenant colonel Árpád Barcsay of the gendarmes, were transported to Passau Bavaria, then to Pfarrkirchen, and finally force marched to Gschaid. The Ministry of Defense discovered the constantly moving prisoners in Simbach, and their intervention forced the prisoners' transport to the ministry compound in Tann where they were released. From Tann, on Sunday 28 April 1945, together with his brother, he moved to Zimmern where he found accommodations on a Bavarian farm until the US forces reached them on 1 May.

=== Later life ===
He managed to return to Hungary in 1946, and in the initial period of the governing coalition of the various political factions, he participated as a committee member for the assessment of military pensions.

After the Communist takeover of 1948, together with many of his peers, he was unjustly attacked, his apartment confiscated, and his pension revoked. He found employment as a gardener and caretaker at the tree nursery of Pilisi Parkerdő gazdaság (hu), where he tended to the planting and care of seedlings and, later, he found employment as a metalsmith.

At the beginning of 1950s a singularly unexpected event transpired. He received an invitation to the fiftieth graduation reunion of his high school. The invitation came from his former classmate and fellow graduate, Dr. Petru Groza, who at the time was the President of Romania. Nagy replied that he could not participate due to his lack of funds and a passport. The President then used his influence with the Hungarian government, and the Secretary of the Hungarian Communist Party, Mátyás Rákosi, was obliged to provide the means to attend the reunion. Further intervention by the President saw the general's pension reinstated.

He gained a measure of comfort and fulfillment when he was selected in 1965 as the first Hungarian Righteous Among the Nations by the Yad Vashem Institute of Jerusalem. The aging general remained mentally active until his death by spending his time writing, editing, and reading. In 1964, he re-edited his work, Végzetes esztendök ("Fateful Years"), which was originally published in 1947. The long-lived soldier died in Piliscsaba on 21 June 1976, shortly after his ninety-second birthday.

== Works ==
In addition to his military expertise, Vilmos Nagy of Nagybaczon was also a military theorist and a historian.

His contributions based on his personal and extensive battlefield and General Staff experience, have provided valuable knowledge about the times. His works include:

- The Campaign Against Romania (A Románia elleni hadjárat), Budapest, 1923.
- The Attack (A támadás), Budapest, 1926.
- Conquest of Serbia (Szerbia meghódítása), Budapest, 1929
- The Fateful Years 1938–1945. (Végzetes esztendök 1938–1945), memoirs (emlékirat) Budapest, 1947). The Fateful Years 1938-1945 English language edition translator Thomas Cooper. Introduction by MEP George Schöpflin. Helena History Press, Reno, 2019

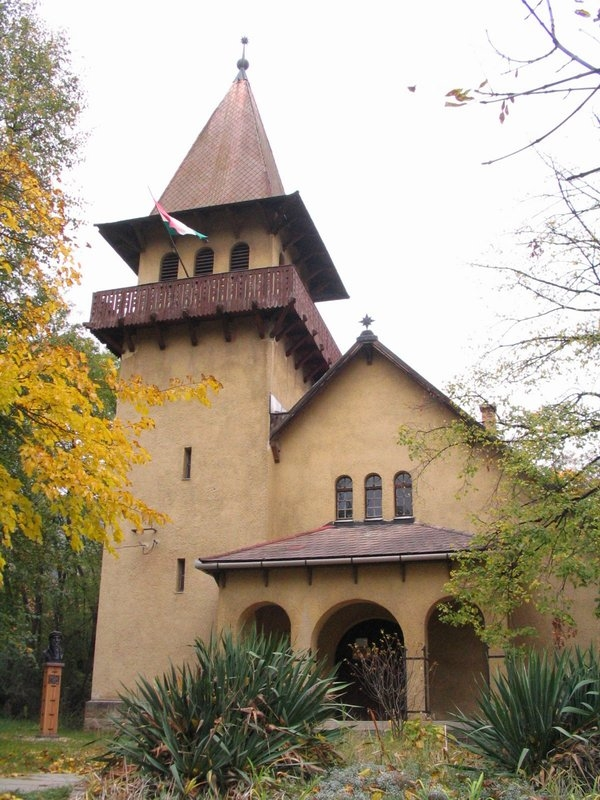
The reform church in Piliscsaba (Klotildliget), which was built in 1939 at Vilmos Nagy' initiative and plans.

== Career highlights ==
- Commissioned lieutenant in 1905 after graduating from the Budapest Ludovica Military Academy.
- Graduated in 1912 from the Imperial War College (German: Kriegsschule in Vienna, Austria (1909–1912).
- Promoted to major in 1914 and assigned to the Austrian Imperial General Staff.
- During World War I, served with various military units and at the Ministry of War of Austro-Hungary.
- Served on the General Staff of the Hungarian Soviet Republic with the rank of major.
- After the collapse of the Republic in August 1919, reinstated as major and assigned to the reorganized Royal Hungarian Army General Staff.
- Between 1927 and 1931, served as the Colonel in chief of the 1st mounted infantry brigade.
- Between 1931 and 1933 served as the adjutant to the Commander in Chief of the Royal Hungarian Army.
- Promoted to brigadier general in 1934.
- Between 1935 and 1936 served as the Quartermaster General at the Ministry of Defense.
- Promoted to major general in 1937.
- Between 1938 and 1939 served as the commanding officer of the 1st Army Corps.
- Between 1939 and 1940 served as the Inspector General of the Infantry.
- Between 1940 and 1941, unexpectedly placed in retirement, then recalled and appointed as the commanding officer of the 1st Hungarian Army.
- From 24 September 1942 to 12 June 1943 served as the Minister of Defense in the government of Miklós Kállay.
- Arrested and imprisoned upon the accession of the Szálasi government.
- Named in 1965 as a Righteous among the Nations by the Yad Vashem Institute, being the first among Hungarians to be so honoured.

== In memoriam ==
- In retirement, Vilmos Nagy lived under very modest circumstances and recognition was denied until the 1990s, when changes in the political landscape made this possible.
- As part of Hungary's millennium celebrations on 9 September 2000, his hometown organized The first World Meet of Piliscsaba, during which he was posthumously honoured as an 'Honorary citizen of Piliscsaba', an act that pleased his old neighbours and fellow townsmen. The honour was accepted by his grandchildren, Mrs. András Fáy and Mrs. Károly Nagy.
- On 18 June 2003, with the active promotion of the Federation of Jewish Communities in Hungary, in hand with the Hungarian Federation of Forced Laborers, and the National Memorial and Reconciliation Commission of Hungary, dedicated a memorial plaque in honour of the former Minister of Defense.
- On the 120th anniversary of his birth in 2004, Nagybaczon in Transylvania also dedicated a memorial plaque in his honour.
- On 9 September 2006, with a military guard of honour present, his burial place was declared a part of the National Cemetery of Hungary.

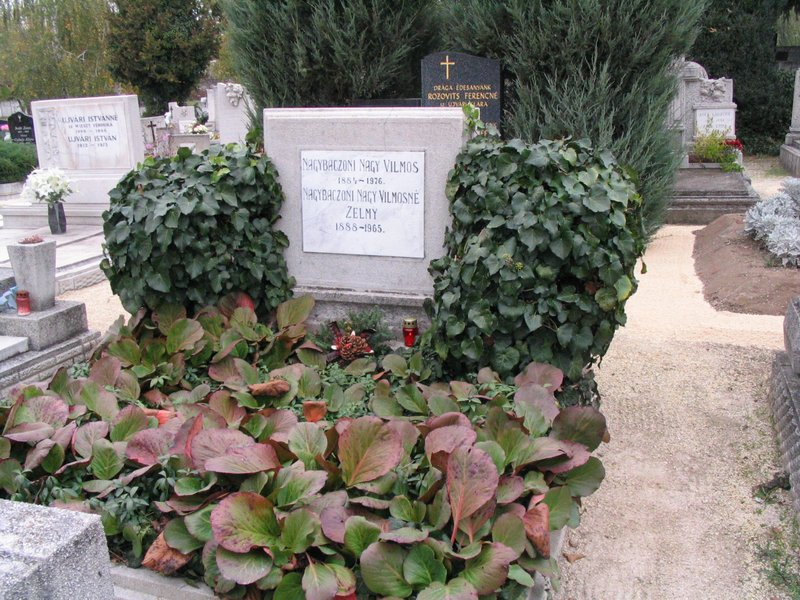
The grave of Vilmos Nagy of Nagybaczoni in Piliscsaba

== Publications ==
- József Károlyfalvi: The Presbyterian General: The Military and Political career of Vilmos Nagy of Nagybaczon (A református tábornok: Nagybaczoni-Nagy Vilmos katonai-politikai pályája)
- Sándor Szakály: The Hungarian Military Elite 1938–1945. Osiris Publishers (A magyar katonai elit)
- Cornelius, Deborah S (2011). Hungary in World War II: Caught in the Cauldron. New York: Fordham University Press. ISBN 978-0823233441.
- Kramer, T.D (2000). From Emancipation to Catastrophe The Rise and Holocaust of Hungarian Jewry. London: : Bloomsbury Academic. ISBN 9780761817598.

Political offices
Preceded by Károly Bartha	Minister of Defence; 1942–1943	Succeeded by Lajos Csatay
Military offices
Preceded by none	Commander of the Hungarian First Army; 1 March 1940 – 1 February 1941	Succeeded by Lieutenant-General István Schweitzer
