= Károly Beregfy =

Hungarian military officer and politician

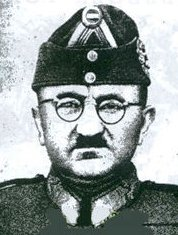
- Born: Károly Berger; 12 February 1888; Cservenka, Bács-Bodrog County, Kingdom of Hungary, Austria-Hungary now Crvenka, Vojvodina, Serbia
- Died: 12 March 1946 (aged 58); Budapest, Republic of Hungary
- Military career
- Allegiance: Austria-Hungary; Hungarian Soviet Republic (Kingdom of Hungary (1920–1946)) Kingdom of Hungary
- Service years: 1912–1945
- Rank: Vezérezredes (Colonel General)
- Commands: Hungarian Third Army, Hungarian First Army
- Conflicts: World War I World War II

Károly Beregfy (12 February 1888 – 12 March 1946) was a Hungarian military officer and politician, who served as Minister of Defence in the 1944–45 Arrow Cross Party government.

He was born as Károly Berger in Cservenka (Crvenka). He fought in the First World War where he was seriously injured. Then he joined the Hungarian Red Army to fight against the rebel nationalities. Between 1939 and 1941, he was commandant of the Royal Military Academy.

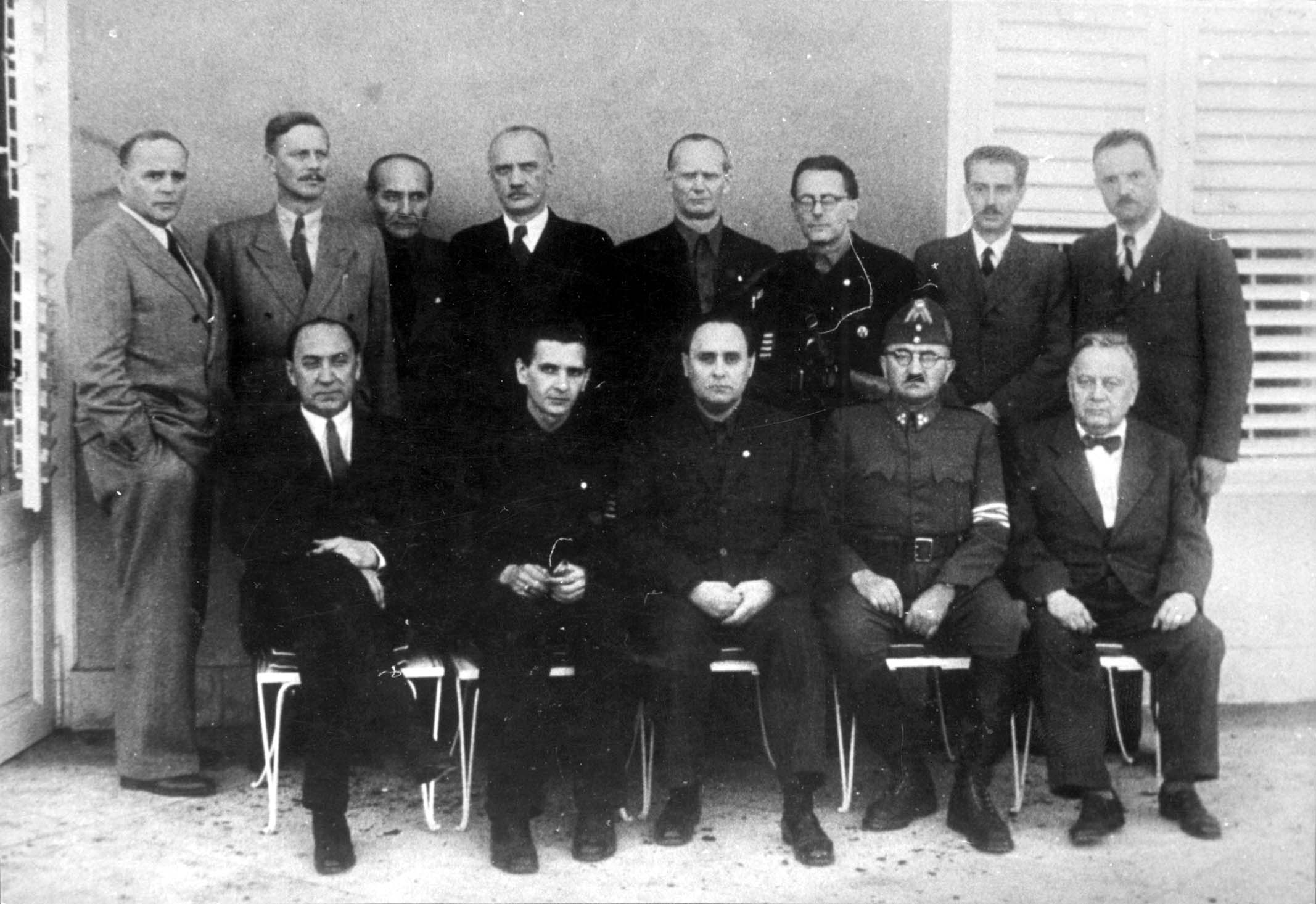
Ministers of the Arrow Cross Party government. Károly Beregfy is in the fourth from left of the lower row.

He fought in the Second World War from 1941 as commander of the VI Corps, and later commanded the Third Army and the First Army. In April 1944 he suffered a serious defeat by the Red Army. The commission examining the reasons of the defeat established Beregfy's personal responsibility, so he was dismissed from his field command.

He sympathized with the Arrow Cross Party from the beginning, although he could not join since under Hungarian Army regulations the members of political parties could not be officers in the Hungarian Army. After Operation Margarethe Arrow Cross leader Ferenc Szálasi sought him out and asked him to assist in a coup if Miklós Horthy tried to negotiate a surrender.

After the Arrow Cross Party's coup (15 and 16 October 1944) the new prime minister Szálasi appointed Beregfy as Minister of Defence. He also served as Chief of Army Staff. Beregfy declared Hungary a manoeuvre area on 30 October and subordinated all attainable human and economical resources to the war.

On 30 April 1945 he was captured by United States Army troops. Brought to trial before the People's Tribunal he denied his guilt throughout. The court did not accept his arguments (Beregfy referred to disability and compulsion) and sentenced him to death. He was hanged on 12 March 1946, along with Ferenc Szálasi, Gábor Vajna, former interior minister in the Arrow Cross Party's cabinet and József Gera, who was a Hungarist ideologist.

== Awards and decorations ==
Beregfy's ribbonrack according his service record.

1st row	Order of Merit of the Kingdom of Hungary Grand Cross on war ribbon	Order of Merit of the Kingdom of Hungary Commander's Cross with Star	Order of Merit of the Kingdom of Hungary Officer's Cross	Order of Merit of the Kingdom of Hungary Knight's Cross
2nd row	Military Merit Cross 3rd Class with war decoration and swords	Silver Military Merit Medal on war ribbon	Bronze Military Merit Medal on war ribbon with swords	Hungarian Bronze Military Merit Medal
3rd row	Hungarian Bronze Military Merit Medal	Karl Troop Cross	Wound Medal for the disabled	Hungarian World War I Commemorative Medal
4th row	Long Service Crosses for Officers 1st class	Transylvania Commemorative Medal	Mobilization Cross 1912/13	

== Sources ==
- Magyar Életrajzi Lexikon
- Géza Lakatos: As I saw it: the tragedy of Hungary. Englewood, New Jersey: Universe Publishing, 1993.

Political offices
Preceded by Lajos Csatay	Minister of Defence; 1944–1945	Succeeded by János Vörös
Military offices
Preceded by Lieutenant-General Lajos Csatay	Commander of the Hungarian Third Army; 12 June 1943 – 15 May 1944	Succeeded by Lieutenant-General József Heszlényi
Preceded by Lieutenant-General Géza Lakatos	Commander of the Hungarian First Army; 15 May 1944 – 1 August 1944	Succeeded by Lieutenant-General Béla Miklós
Preceded by Colonel-General János Vörös	Chief of the General Staff; 16 October 1944 – 30 April 1945	Succeeded by Colonel-General János Vörös
