= János Vörös =

Hungarian military officer and politician

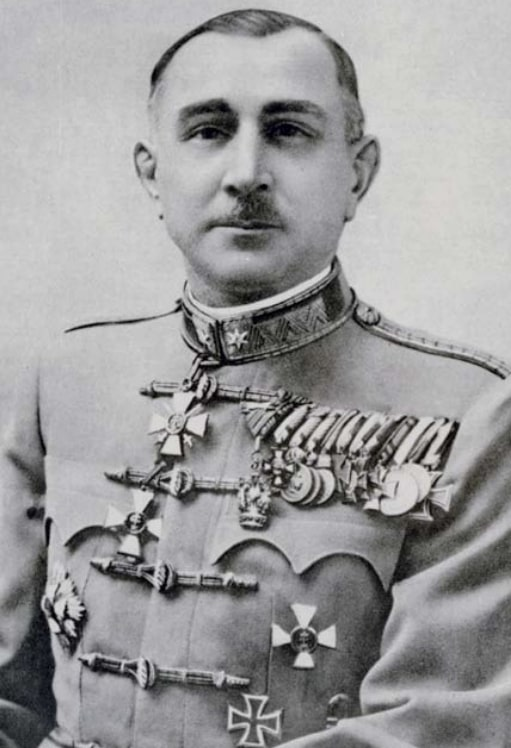
- Born: 25 March 1891; Csabrendek, Kingdom of Hungary
- Died: 23 July 1968 (aged 77); Balatonfüred, Hungarian People's Republic
- Military career
- Allegiance: Austria-Hungary (to 1918); Kingdom of Hungary
- Branch: Austro-Hungarian Army (Hungary) Royal Hungarian Army
- Service years: 1911-1946
- Rank: Colonel General
- Units: 7th Field Artillery Regiment, Army corps Szombathely, Second Motorist Brigade, Second Corps Székesfehérvár
- Conflicts: World War I; World War II

János Vörös (25 March 1891 – 23 July 1968) was a Hungarian military officer and politician who served as Minister of Defence in the unofficial Interim National Government which led by Béla Miklós. He fought in the First World War at the Eastern Front and the Italian Campaign.

When on 19 March 1944, the Nazis occupied Hungary, the prime minister Miklós Kállay summoned him along with István Náday and Károly Beregfy to the prime minister's office to ask him if were possible for Hungary to resist the invasion. Vörös stated that resistance was futile and advised Kállay to accept the occupation. Whe Kállay insisted on ordering resistance, Vörös along with Beregfy stated he would disobey any order to resist. After the occupation, General Ferenc Szombathelyi was dismissed as Chief of Army Staff on 19 April 1944 and Vörös was appointed as his successor. The German minister plenipotentiary, Edmund Veesenmayer, had personally selected Vörös as the chief of the general staff because he was an opportunistic "careerist" who would serve whoever was in power as he lacked any sort of values and principles.

In July 1944, the radical László Baky, who served as a state secretary at the Interior Ministry, made a coup attempt by moving armed units of the Royal Hungarian Gendarmerie into Budapest, which was a violation of Hungarian law as the gendarmerie were supposed to only operate in rural areas and were not allowed to enter the cities unless off-duty and unarmed. The Regent of Hungary, Admiral Miklós Horthy, reacted by ignoring Vörös completely by appointing General Károly Lázár, the commander of the Royal Guard who protected the Royal Castle, military governor of Budapest with orders to send the gendarmerie back to the countryside. Lázár moved the 1st Armored Division into Budapest and on 5–8 July 1944 Hungary appeared to be on the brink of civil war as the gendarmes and soldiers uneasily faced off on the streets of Budapest. Vörös told Horthy he was wrong to issue his halt order to stop deporting Hungarian Jews to Auschwitz along with the order to confront Baky, saying the Germans were unwilling to tolerate either. General Faraghó, the commander of the Royal Hungarian Gendarmerie, was unwilling to disobey a direct order from Horthy to have his men leave Budapest and ordered his men back to the countryside on 8 July 1944. On 22 June 1944, the Red Army started Operation Bagration, which saw the destruction of German Army Group Center, which created a huge grapping hole on the Eastern Front. With the crisis caused by the success of Operation Bagration with the Wehrmacht desperately rushing up divisions in an attempt to stop the Red Army from advancing west, the Germans did not have extra troops to send to Budapest. After the gendarmes left Budapest, Baky was sacked as state secretary, and the Horthy's halt order with regards to deporting Jews held, saving the 170,000 or so Jews living in Budapest for the moment. Veesenmayer was deeply unhappy about Horthy's halt order to the deportations of the Jews, but with the Wehrmacht pulling divisions out of Hungary to send north to deal with the crisis caused by Operation Bagration, he was unable to do anything to re-start the deportations.

On 17 July 1944, Horthy attempted to dismiss General Döme Sztójay as prime minister, only to blocked by Veesenmayer, who told him that Hitler strongly disapproved of dismissing Sztójay. Veesenmayer told Horthy that if he dismissed Sztójay, Hitler would erase Hungary from the map by partitioning it between Romania, Slovakia and Croatia. Later that same, Horthy summoned Vörös to the Royal Castle to ask him "what would happen if we were to undertake armed resistance against the Germans?" Vörös told Horthy that resistance would be the end of Hungary and told him that he must under no conditions dismiss Sztójay. Afterwards, Vörös called a meeting of the general staff, saying that Hungary must never fight against Germany and everything must be done to maintain good relations with the Reich even if meant disobeying Horthy. On 10 September 1944, Vörös attended a meeting of the Crown Council where signing an armistice with the Soviet Union was discussed. Vörös was opposed to signing an armistice and advised Horthy to continue the war even if meant the destruction of Hungary. On 17 September 1944, an aristocrat of strongly left-wing views, Count Labomér Zichy, arrived at the Royal Castle, to say he had been in contact with a Red Army officer, a Colonel Makarov, who told him that if the Hungarians were to send a delegation to Moscow they would receive favorable armistice terms. Horthy was at first opposed to taking up Zichy's offer, only for Vörös to arrive and confirm the existence of Colonel Makarov and the offer to sign an armistice in Moscow.

On 11 October 1944, an armistice with the Soviet Union was signed in Moscow to come into effect on 20 October 1944. Horthy attempted to move his armies into place for the armistice and he decided on his own to bring the armistice into effect on 15 October. Horthy did not trust Vörös, whom he believed to be pro-Nazi, and did not properly explain to him why was deploying the Hungarian armies. On 15 October 1944, Vörös sabotaged the attempt of Horthy to bring into effect an armistice with the Soviet Union. At about 3: 00 pm on 15 October, Vörös issued a "clarification" to all Honved officers saying that Horthy in his radio broadcast that day had merely opened up armistice talks with the Soviet Union and as there was no armistice, the war would continue until further notice, an action which undermined the entire armistice that had just been signed in Moscow. Later in November 1944 Vörös defected and joined the Red Army which arrived at Hungary's eastern border. Vörös became minister of defense in the new provisional government that the Soviets had established to oppose the Arrow Cross regime.

He was the signer of the Moscow armistice convention as one of the members of the Interim Government delegation. In 1946 he was retired by them at his own request. During his 58th birthday (1949) he was arrested with the charge of spying by the military investigation service. The Military Court sentenced Vörös to life imprisonment him in 1950. He was released from prison in 1956 and died in 1968 in Balatonfüred.

== Books ==
- Cornelius, Deborah S (2011). Hungary in World War II: Caught in the Cauldron. New York: Fordham University Press. ISBN 978-0823233441.

Political offices
Preceded by Károly Beregfy	Minister of Defence; 1944–1945	Succeeded by Jenő Tombor
Military offices
Preceded by Colonel-General Ferenc Szombathelyi	Chief of the General Staff; 20 April 1944 – 16 October 1944	Succeeded by Colonel-General Károly Beregfy
Preceded by Colonel-General Károly Beregfy	Chief of the General Staff; 15 November 1945 – 1 September 1946	Succeeded by Vacant
