= Order of Merit of the Kingdom of Hungary =

1922–1946 award

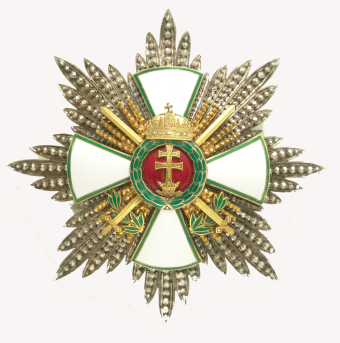
- Grand Cross with the Holy Crown of Saint Stephen, War Decoration and Swords
- Country: Hungary
- Established: 14 June 1922
- First award: 1922
- Final award: 1946

The Order of Merit of the Kingdom of Hungary (Hungarian: Magyar Érdemrend) was established on 14 June 1922 by Miklós Horthy, the Regent of the Kingdom of Hungary. After the promulgation of the new Hungarian constitution on 20 August 1949, the order was disestablished. After the collapse of the communist regime in Hungary, a very similar order was established as the second-highest distinction of the country.

== History ==
The Hungarian Cross of Merit was established on 14 June 1922 by Vice Admiral Horthy. After its establishment, the rules of the order were changed numerous times. On 23 December 1935, it became an official distinction as Hungarian Order of Merit recognizing both civil and military accomplishments. From on 1939 to 1944, the highest degree of the order, the Grand Cross with the Holy Crown of Stephen (Istvan), was awarded to both chiefs of state (i.e. monarchs of presidents) or heads of government (i.e. prime ministers and chancellors). In addition, the class of the Holy Crown and the Collar was instituted which was awarded exclusively to chiefs of state. All classes of the order could be awarded in recognition of military distinction, the military "division" of the order having crossed swords and a different ribbon which was mostly red rather than the green of the civil division.

After the Hungarian monarchy was formally abolished following the abdication of Admiral Horthy and the defeat of Hungary in World War II, on 14 September 1946 the National Assembly of Hungary disestablished the order and replaced it by the Order of Merit of the Republic of Hungary (Hungarian: Magyar Köztársasági Érdemrend). After the communist takeover of Hungary and the promulgation of the new Hungarian constitution on 20 August 1949, the order was disestablished.

Following the collapse of the communist regime in Hungary in 1989 a new order, known as the Hungarian Order of Merit (Hungarian: Magyar Érdemrend), was established in 1991. Though it has a similar appearance, this is stated to be a new order and not a re-establishment of the previous order.

== Classes ==
Originally, the order was instituted in three grades: gilt, silver and bronze. Eventually the order was expanded to include the following seven classes:

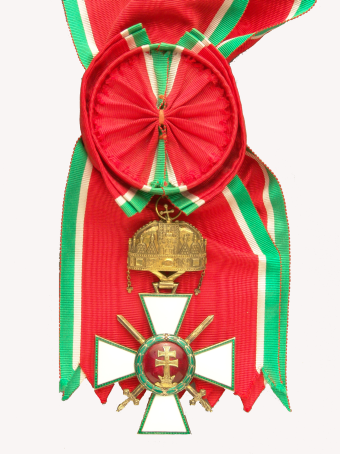
Sash and Cross for the grade of Grand Cross with the Holy Crown of Saint Stephen

- Grand Cross (1st Class)
  - Special grades
    - Grand Cross with collar (with the St. Stephen's crown until 1945)
    - Grand Cross with golden rays (first without a crown, later with the St. Stephen's crown: until 1945)
- Commander with Star (2nd Class with the Star)
- Commander (2nd Class)
- Officer (3rd Class)
- Knight (4th Class)
- Merit Cross (5th Class)
  - Golden Cross of Merit
  - Silver Cross of Merit
  - Bronze Cross of Merit
- Merit Medal (6th Class)
  - Silver Medal of Merit
  - Bronze Medal of Merit
- Signum Laudis (7th Class)
  - Grand Golden Signum Laudis Medal
  - Silver Signum Laudis Medal
  - Bronze Signum Laudis Medal

Between 1939 and end-1944, the Grand Cross could be awarded—as a mark of the highest esteem—with the Crown of St. Stephen (Szent Korona or "Holy Crown"), an honor primarily reserved for heads of state and government. This class could also be awarded with a collar. Furthermore, all classes could be awarded for wartime merit with a war decoration or war ribbon, or with a war decoration or war ribbon and swords.

The Signum Laudis in its silver and bronze grades takes the form of a round medal featuring the Crown of Saint Stephen; it shares the same physical characteristics as the Hungarian Medal of Merit, except that it lacks the inscription A HAZÁERT. Furthermore, the reverse bears only a three-line inscription: SIGNUM / LAUDIS / 1922. The bronze grade signifies the Regent's initial expression of recognition, while the silver grade represents repeated recognition. A third instance of recognition is indicated by a bar on the ribbon. If full recognition was accorded to civilians, or "especially praiseworthy recognition" to military personnel, the recipient was entitled to wear the Gold Medal—suspended from the Crown of Saint Stephen on a red ribbon with white edge stripes—around the neck. This gold-plated medal was instituted in 1929. Unlike the lower grades, the Grand Gold Signum Laudis is tall and oval in shape. Following the proclamation of the republic, the obverse featured the state coat of arms. The medals were subsequently discontinued.

== Recipients (excerpt) ==
- Vice Admiral Miklós Horthy
- Hermann Göring (Grand Cross with the Holy Crown)
- Joachim von Ribbentrop (Grand Cross with the Holy Crown)
- Erhard Milch (Grand Cross)
- Wilhelm Keitel (Grand Cross)
- Grand Admiral Erich Raeder (Grand Cross on the War Ribbon with Swords)
- Gerd von Rundstedt (Grand Cross)
- Rolf Carls (Grand Cross)
- Fedor von Bock (Grand Cross on the War Ribbon with Swords)
- Pasha Sherif Sabri
- Poglavnik Ante Pavelić
- General Douglas MacArthur
