= Seventeenth =

Seventeenth is the ordinal form of the number 17. Seventeenth or 17th may also refer to:

- A fraction, 1/17th, equal to one of 17 equal parts
- Seventeenth of the month, a recurring calendar date
- Seventeenth, a pipe organ stop
- "The 17th", 2016 song by the Courteeners
- 17th birthday, the age of majority in several countries

== Geography ==
- 17th meridian east, a line of longitude
- 17th meridian west, a line of longitude
- 17th parallel north, a circle of latitude
- 17th parallel south, a circle of latitude
- 17th Avenue (disambiguation)
- 17th Street (disambiguation)

== Military ==
- 17th Army (disambiguation)
- 17th Battalion (disambiguation)
- 17th Brigade (disambiguation)
- 17th Cavalry (disambiguation)
- 17th Division (disambiguation)
- 17th Infantry
- 17th Lancers
- 17th Regiment (disambiguation)
- 17th Squadron (disambiguation)

== Other ==
- Seventeenth Amendment (disambiguation)
  - Seventeenth Amendment to the United States Constitution
- 17th century
- 17th century BC
- 17th Congress (disambiguation)
- 17th Legislative Assembly (disambiguation)

== See also ==
- 17 (disambiguation)
