= XVII Corps =

XVII Corps, 17th Corps, or Seventeenth Corps may refer to:

== Germany ==
=== German Empire ===
- XVII Corps (German Empire), Imperial German Army, prior to and during World War I
- XVII Reserve Corps, Imperial German Army, World War I

=== Nazi Germany ===
- XVII Army Corps (Wehrmacht)
- XVII Waffen Corps of the SS (Hungarian), Waffen-SS

== Russia and Soviet Union ==
=== Russian Empire ===
- 17th Army Corps (Russian Empire)

=== Soviet Union ===
- 17th Mechanized Corps
- 17th Rifle Corps
- 17th Tank Corps

== United Kingdom ==
- XVII Corps (United Kingdom)

=== Artillery Volunteer Corps ===
- 17th Lanarkshire Artillery Volunteer Corps

=== Rifle Volunteer Corps ===
- 17th (Stockport) Cheshire Rifle Volunteer Corps
- 17th (Clay Cross) Derbyshire Rifle Volunteer Corps
- 17th (Totnes) Devonshire Rifle Volunteer Corps
- 17th (Stockbrokers and Accountants) Lanarkshire Rifle Volunteer Corps
- 17th (Seisdon) Staffordshire Rifle Volunteer Corps
- 17th (Etchingham) Sussex Rifle Volunteer Corps

== Other countries ==
- 17th Corps (China)
- 17th Army Corps (France)
- XVII Corps (India)
- XVII Corps (Italy)
- XVII Corps (Ottoman Empire)
- 17th Army Corps (Ukraine)
- XVII Corps (Union Army)

== See also ==
- List of military corps by number
- 17th Army (disambiguation)
- 17th Division (disambiguation)
- 17th Brigade (disambiguation)
- 17th Regiment (disambiguation)
- 17th Battalion (disambiguation)
- 17th Squadron (disambiguation)
- 17th (disambiguation)
