= 17th Army =

17th Army can refer to:

- 17th Army (German Empire)
- 17th Army (Wehrmacht)
- 17th Army (Soviet Union)
- 17th Air Army, Soviet Union
- Seventeenth Army (Japan), Imperial Japanese Army
- Seventeenth Area Army, Imperial Japanese Army

== See also ==
- List of armies by number
- XVII Corps (disambiguation)
- 17th Division (disambiguation)
- 17th Brigade (disambiguation)
- 17th Regiment (disambiguation)
- 17th Battalion (disambiguation)
- 17th Squadron (disambiguation)
- 17th (disambiguation)
