= 17th Division =

17th Division may refer to:

== Infantry divisions ==
- 17th Infantry Division (Bangladesh)
- 17th Infantry Division (Belgium)
- 17th Colonial Infantry Division, France
- 17th Division (German Empire)
- 17th Landwehr Division, German Empire
- 17th Reserve Division, German Empire
- 17th Infantry Division (Wehrmacht)
- 17th SS Panzergrenadier Division Götz von Berlichingen
- 17th Infantry Division (Greece)
- 17th Indian Division, British Indian Army during World War I
- 17th Infantry Division (India)
- 17th Ali ibn Abi Taleb Division, Iran
- 17th Infantry Division "Pavia", Kingdom of Italy
- 17th Division (Imperial Japanese Army)
- 17th Infantry Division (Poland)
- 17th Infantry Division (Russian Empire)
- 17th Infantry Division (South Korea)
- 17th Guards Motor Rifle Division, earlier the 17th Guards Mechanized Division, Soviet Union
- 17th Guards Rifle Division, Soviet Union
- 17th Rifle Division, Soviet Union
- 17th Division (Syria)
- 17th (Northern) Division, United Kingdom
- 17th Gurkha Division, United Kingdom
- 17th Division, National Guard division established in early 1917 consisting of Indiana and Kentucky; later 38th Infantry Division (United States)
- 17th Infantry Division (United States)
- 17th Division (Yugoslav Partisans)

== Airborne divisions ==
- 17th Parachute Division, Algeria
- 17th Airborne Division, United States

== Armoured divisions ==
- 17th Panzer Division, Germany
- 17th Division (Iraq)
- 17th Tank Division (Soviet Union)
- 17th Guards Tank Division, Soviet Union

== Other divisions ==
- 17th Public Security Division, People's Republic of China
- 17th Air Division, United States
- 17th Air Division (Provisional), United States, Gulf War

== See also ==
- 17th Army (disambiguation)
- XVII Corps (disambiguation)
- 17th Brigade (disambiguation)
- 17th Regiment (disambiguation)
- 17th Battalion (disambiguation)
- 17th Squadron (disambiguation)
