= 17th Regiment of Light Dragoons =

Two cavalry regiments of the British Army have been numbered the 17th Regiment of Light Dragoons:

- 17th Regiment of Light Dragoons (1759), (1759-1763)
- 17th Regiment of Light Dragoons (17th Lancers), raised as 18th Dragoons in 1759 and redesignated as a lancer regiment in 1861.

== See also ==
- 17th Regiment (disambiguation)
