= Ferenc Feketehalmy-Czeydner =

Hungarian officer and war criminal

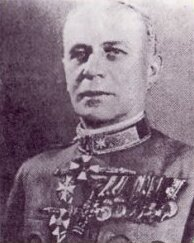
- Born: 22 November 1890; Piski, Austria-Hungary (today Simeria, Romania)
- Died: 5 November 1946 (aged 55); Žabalj, Yugoslavia
- Military career
- Allegiance: Austria-Hungary; Kingdom of Hungary
- Rank: Colonel General; SS-Obergruppenführer
- Commands: V Corps; XVII SS Corps
- Conflicts: World War I World War II

Vitéz Ferenc Feketehalmy-Czeydner (22 November 1890 – 5 November 1946), born Franz Zeidner, was a Hungarian military officer who had a significant role in the Novi Sad massacre during the Second World War.

== Military career ==
Feketehalmy-Czeydner was born in Piski (modern Simeria) as Franz Zeidner into a Saxon family as the volksdeutsche (ethnic Germans) of Transylvania were known. Most of the families of the volksdeutsche of Transylvania had arrived in the Middle Ages were believed to be from the Saxony region of Germany, hence the moniker of Saxons that was applied to them. His first language was German, but he was fluent in Hungarian. In the military of Austria-Hungary, German was the language of command and as such Hungarian volksdeutsche tended to do well as officers as they did not have to learn German as the ethnic Hungarians did.

After training at the artillery cadet school in Traiskirchen and Theresia Military Academy, Feketehalmy-Czeydner became a lieutenant in 1910 for Zeidner Feldhaubitzregiment No. 12. During World War I, where he served as an artillery and staff officer and attained the rank of captain. After the war, he joined the newly founded Royal Hungarian Army, where he served in 1921 as a staff officer at the 7th Mixed Brigade in Miskolc. Additionally, he taught at the Hungarian Military Academy.

In the inter-war period, he changed his surname from Zeidner to the more Magyar-sounding Feketehalmy-Czeydner. His wife, Anna, was also a volksdeutsche, and reflecting his background Feketehalmy-Czeydner was always very proud of his Germanic heritage while at the same time being very loyal to Hungary. In 1928, he was transferred to the Ministry of Defence, and, in 1929, was promoted to lieutenant colonel. From November 1934 he was deputy director of the aviation ministry, and in March 1938 he became Air Force Chief of Section in the Ministry of Defence.

In November 1938 he took over as commander of the 6th Infantry Brigade and was promoted to Major General the following year. From March 1940 he was Chief of General Staff of the Hungarian First Army before he was appointed as Commanding General of the Fifth Army Corps stationed in Szeged in August 1941. In November of that year he was promoted to Lieutenant General.

=== World War II ===
In late December 1941, the prime minister László Bárdossy ordered the Honved (Royal Hungarian Army) to put down partisan guerrilla activities. The chief of the general staff, General Ferenc Szombathelyi selected the 5th Corps of the Honved based in Szeged under the command of Feketehalmy-Czeydner as the best unit to deploy to Yugoslavia. The American historian Deborah Cornelius described Feketehalmy-Czeydner as "a fanatical National Socialist with sadistic tendencies". In January 1942, troops under his command conducted a large-scale massacre in Bačka (Bácska) which had been occupied by Hungary. The operation was arranged by Feketehalmy-Czeydner after the assassination of several Hungarian gendarmes and soldiers along with acts of sabotage by Yugoslav partisans. Three battalions under Colonel László Deák were dispatched to the area where they received assistance from local police, gendarmerie and army units present.

Erich Kampf, the German consul in Szeged (the headquarters of the 5th Corps) happened to be a very good friend of Feketehalmy-Czeydner who assured him that the volksdeutsche of Újvidék (as the Yugoslav city of Novi Sad had been renamed after being annexed to Hungary) had nothing to fear as the operation was being carefully planned so that no Magyars or volksdeutsche would be killed. Germany saw itself as the special protector of all the volksdeutsche communities in Eastern Europe and any killing of the volksdeutsche in the Banat would had seriously strained Hungarian-German relations. Kampf's reports to Berlin in January 1942 stressing that Feketehalmy-Czeydner had promised him that no volksdeutsche would be harmed strongly supports the conclusion that the massacre was premeditated and planned. A few days later, Endre Bajcsy-Zsilinszky met with Bárdossy to tell him that he learned from his contacts in the Honved of a massacre being planned by Feketehalmy-Czeydner and he begged Bárdossy to stop the "bloodbath" being planned.

At Žabalj (Zsablya) the partisans had been observed in its vicinity. Under orders of Feketehalmy-Czeydner the entire population of Žabalj was massacred on 12 January 1942. Claiming that the partisans had retreated into Novi Sad, Feketehalmy-Czeydner requested permission from Bárdossy and the Council of Ministers to extend operations into the city, which was granted. On 20 January 1942, Feketehalmy-Czeydner had the entire city surrounded by his troops while informing the mayor that he was in charge for the next days to conduct a razzia. From 21 to 23 January a pogrom was held in Novi Sad (Újvidék), when nearly 2, 000 people, including 550 Jews and 292 Serbs were murdered. On the evening of 21 January 1942, Feketehalmy-Czeydner called a meeting of all his senior officers where he complained that he was unhappy with the results of the razzia so far. Despite the fact that no soldiers or gendarmes had beem injured, let alone killed, Feketehalmy-Czeydner falsely claimed that a number of soldiers and gendarmres had been killed and stated that now was the time to take revenge. During the first day of the razzia, suspected guerrillas had been taken verification committee designed to vet their loyalties. Feketehalmy-Czeydner ordered that suspects were no longer to be go the verification committee and were instead to be taken straight to the Danube to be executed. He also ordered the arrest of the richest Jewish and Serb families in Újvidék, claiming rather implausiblely that they were financing the Partisans. On 23 January 1942, the Lord Mayor was able to escape from the city and report that a massacre had been going on for the last two days, which led to orders from Budapest to stop. By 31 January at least 3,808 people had been killed.

The Novi Sad massacre sparked protests in Hungary, which were led by the chairman of the opposition Smallholders Party, Endre Bajcsy-Zsilinszky. Bajcsy-Zsilinszky raised the issue of the massacre in a debate in Parliament with Bárdossy. As a result, Feketehalmy-Czeydner was retired, but remained unpunished. Feketehalmy-Czeydner conducted the first investigation of the massacre, where he concluded there was no massacre and the razzia had been carried out "with distinction". Bárdossy accepted the results of Feketehalmy-Czeydner's investigation at face value and ruled there was no need for criminal charges. In March 1942, Bárdossy was replaced as prime minister with Miklós Kállay. Kállay ordered a new investigation of the massacre, which was halted in August 1942 at the personal order of the Regent, Admiral Miklós Horthy, who felt that bringing Honved officers to trial would damage the image of the Hungarian military. On 15 July 1943, the prime minister Miklós Kállay promised in a speech to bring those responsible for the massacre to justice. In September 1943, when Hungary was already in negotiations with Western powers over a separate peace, a case was brought against the officers responsible.

On 13 December 1943 the trial of three police officers and twelve Honvéds was opened. Besides for Feketehalmy-Czeydner, Lieutenant Colonel László Deák and Major General József Grassy of the Honvéd along with Captain Márton Zöldy of the Royal Hungarian Gendarmerie were brought to trial. During the trial, the accused were allowed their freedom on the condition that they had given their word as Hungarian officers and gentlemen that they turn themselves if convicted. In January 1944, Feketehalmy-Czeydner was convicted and sentenced to 15 years in prison, while seven co-defendants received sentences of over ten years. On 18 January 1944, the day after his conviction, Feketehalmy-Czeydner fled with three other convicts to Vienna with the help of Archduke Albrecht of the House of Habsburg, where they requested political asylum. Kállay did not file an extradition request, which would likely been denied by Adolf Hitler.

In March 1944 Feketehalmy served in the Waffen SS at first and then joined the II SS Panzer Corps. He returned to Hungary after the German invasion of 19 March 1944. After the coup of Hitler faithful by the Arrow Cross party under Ferenc Szálasi he became Deputy Minister of Defence. As deputy defense minister, he signed the death warrant for his critic Bajcsy-Zsilinszky. He was assigned to the war with the establishment of XVII Hungarian-SS corps that practically existed only on paper.

== Capture and death ==
In May 1945 he fell into American captivity, from which he was shipped to Hungary. At his trial in Budapest between 21-22 May 1946, Feketehalmy-Czeydner testified that he had no involvement in the massacre in Novi Sad and those responsible were "agent provocateurs...probably some officers with Arrow Cross tendencies and their identities should had been known to Zöldy". He also testified that Zöldy had "committed swinish things in the Carpathians" in 1939 during the invasion of Carpatho-Ukraine, which he blamed on Ferenc Szombathelyi. About his earlier trial in 1943-1944, Feketehalmy-Czeydner called it a "justizmord" (German for judicial murder) committed by Szombathely. Feketehalmy-Czeydner claimed at his trial that all he was guilty of was not paying enough attention to his subordinates in Novi Sad. About his own role as the deputy defense minister under the Arrow Cross regime and the execution of his long-term critic Endre Bajcsy-Zsilinszky in December 1944, he claimed that he had been "forced" against his will to sign the death warrant for Bajcsy-Zsilinszky. The court rejected his defense and found him guilty of murder.

The Hungarian authorities handed him over in January 1946 along with four other Hungarian military officers in Yugoslavia. He was tried for war crimes, sentenced to death and executed on 5 November 1946 in Žabalj. Because Feketehalmy-Czeydner was a volksdeutche, the Novi Sad massacre is often portrayed in Hungary as the work of an "outsider". The German historian Arpad von Klimó has argued against this viewpoint, noting that Feketehalmy-Czeydner always saw himself as a Hungarian officer and gentleman, and that the majority of the men under his command who committed the massacre were ethnic Magyars.

== Sources ==
- Zinner Tibor–Róna Péter: Szálasiék bilincsben, Lapkiadó Vállalat, 1986, ISBN 963-272-008-3
- Christian Gerlach–Götz Aly: Das letzte Kapitel. Realpolitik, Ideologie und der Mord an den ungarischen Juden 1944/1945. Deutsche Verlags-Anstalt, Stuttgart, 2002, ISBN 3-421-05505-X.
- Klimó, Árpád von (2018). Remembering Cold Days: The 1942 Massacre of Novi Sad and Hungarian Politics and Society, 1942-1989. Pittsburgh: University of Pittsburgh Press. ISBN 0822965453.
- Cornelius, Deborah S (2011). Hungary in World War II: Caught in the Cauldron. New York: Fordham University Press. ISBN 978-0823233441.
- Nagy-Talavera, Nicholas M. (1970). The Green Shirts and the Others A History of Fascism in Hungary and Rumania. Stanford: Hoover Institution Press. ISBN 9780817918514.
