= 17th Cavalry =

17th Cavalry may refer to:

== Regiments ==
- 17th Cavalry Regiment (British Indian Army)
- 17th Cavalry Regiment (United States)
- 17th Horse (Poona Horse)
- 17th Lancers
- 17th/21st Lancers
- XVII Corps Cavalry Regiment

=== American Civil War regiments ===
==== Union Army ====
- 17th Illinois Cavalry Regiment
- 17th Kentucky Cavalry Regiment
- 17th Pennsylvania Cavalry Regiment

==== Confederate Army ====
- 11th/17th Arkansas Cavalry
- 17th Virginia Cavalry Battalion
- 17th Virginia Cavalry Regiment

== See also ==
- 17th Regiment (disambiguation)
- 17th (disambiguation)
