= 17th Infantry =

17th Infantry may refer to:

- 17th Infantry Division (disambiguation)
- 17th Infantry Brigade (disambiguation)
- 17th Infantry Regiment (disambiguation)

== See also ==
- 17th (disambiguation)
