= 17th Sustainment Brigade =

17th Sustainment Brigade may refer to:

- 17th Sustainment Brigade (Australia)
- 17th Sustainment Brigade (United States)

== See also ==
- 17th Brigade (disambiguation)
