= 17th Party Congress =

17th Party Congress may refer to:

- 17th Party Congress (Soviet Union), i.e., 17th Congress of the All-Union Communist Party, 1934
- 17th Party Congress (China), i.e., 17th National Congress of the Chinese Communist Party, 2007

== See also ==
- 17th Congress (disambiguation)
