= Communist purges in Serbia in 1944–1945 =

War crimes by the Yugoslav Partisan Movement

Communist purges in Serbia
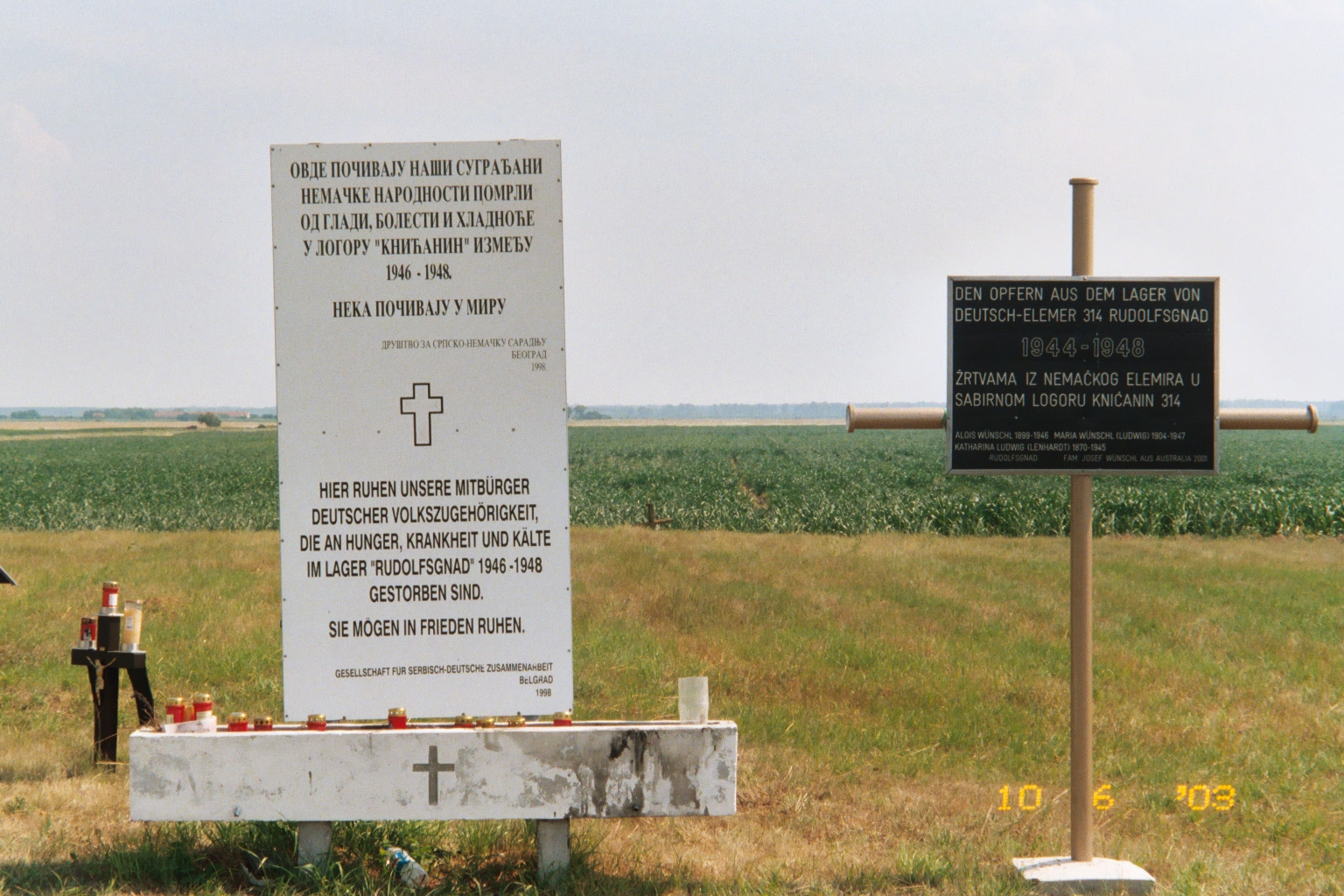
- The German victims' memorial at the edge of the old German graveyard in Knićanin
- Location: PR Serbia, DF Yugoslavia
- Date: 1944–1945
- Target: Quislings, Ideological opponents, Mostly Serbs, Hungarians, Germans and Albanians
- Attack type: War crime, Massacre, Ethnic cleansing, Purge, Summary executions, execution
- Deaths: 80,000–100,000 (estimated)
- Perpetrators: Yugoslav Partisans and post-war communist authorities

The communist purges in Serbia in 1944–1945 are war crimes that were committed by members of the Yugoslav Partisan Movement and the post-war communist authorities after they gained control over Serbia, against people perceived as war criminals, quislings and ideological opponents. Most of these purges were committed between October 1944 and May 1945. During this time, at least 55,973 people died of various causes, including death by execution or by illness in retention camps. The victims – the vast majority of them deliberately summarily executed, without a trial – were of different ethnic backgrounds, but were mostly Germans, Serbs, Albanians and Hungarians. Some contend that the killings were not planned, but were unorganised vendettas of individuals during the post-war chaos, or that those considered victims of execution instead died in battle against the Partisans.

The exact number of victims remains controversial, as the investigation is ongoing. There are different estimates regarding the number of victims. According to one source, at least 80,000 people were executed in the whole of Serbia, while another source states that the number of victims was more than 100,000. The names of about 4,000 individual Germans who were killed by the Partisans are known, but it is estimated that many more ethnic Germans were executed. These events during the fall of 1944 are referred to as "bloody autumn" by some sources. In 2009, the government of Serbia formed a State Commission to investigate the secret burial places of victims after 12 September 1944. The Commission compiled a registry of names, basic biographical data, and details of persecution. The registry contains a total of 55,973 names, including 27,367 Germans, 14,567 Serbs and 6,112 Hungarians.

== Background ==
During World War II, in 1941, Nazi Germany invaded and occupied Yugoslavia. Central Serbia was put under the Military Administration in Serbia (MAS), Kosovo was annexed by the Italian protectorate of Albania, and eastern Serbia was occupied by Bulgaria. The Vojvodina region was divided into three occupation zones: Banat was placed under direct German control as an autonomous region within the area governed by the MAS, Bačka was annexed by Horthy's Hungary and Syrmia was annexed by the Independent State of Croatia.

The Axis powers found it difficult to combat the Yugoslav partisan uprising led by the Communist Party of Yugoslavia, due to a shortage of manpower and the rough terrain, and relied heavily on auxiliary anticommunist forces drawn from various Yugoslav peoples. In Serbia they used the Serbian Volunteer Corps, Serbian State Guard, and the Chetniks of Kosta Pećanac and Dragoljub Mihailović. From the German minority in Banat, Germany organized the 7th SS Volunteer Mountain Division Prinz Eugen. Some Hungarians in Bačka and Baranja joined the Turan Hunters. From the ranks of White Russian emigres, Germany recruited the Russian Protective Corps.

Aside from military and paramilitary formations, many national organizations that weren't originally fascist or irredentist, such as the German Kulturbund and the DMKSZ (Hungarian: Délvidéki Magyar Közművelődési Szövetségnek, English: Cultural Alliance of Hungarians of Southern Lands) also showed support to the occupying armies.

From the beginning of the occupation, the occupying powers committed numerous war crimes against the civilian population of the region, especially against Serbs, Jews and Roma. Therefore, many citizens of Yugoslavia of all ethnic groups joined the partisan resistance movement to fight against the occupation. The victims of the Axis troops were mostly civilians, while some were the fighters of the partisan resistance movement. Vojvodina was a region with an ethnically mixed population.

In their struggle against the Axis forces, the partisans viewed the Chetniks as misled and continuously called on them to defect. A similar policy was conducted toward members of the Croatian Home Guard. Those who defected were included in the partisan ranks or were given amnesty. On 17 August 1944, Josip Broz Tito proclaimed a general amnesty for Chetniks and members of the Croatian Home Guards on condition that they did not commit any crimes and join the partisans before 15 September 1944. Members of voluntary anticommunist or quisling formations (Serbian Volunteer Corps, Ustashe Militia and Russian Protective Corps) were excluded from the offer. This amnesty, as well as the proclamation of King Peter II on 12 September 1944, that all armed formations should come under the command of Marshal Tito, led to a fall in the numbers of the Chetnik and the Croatian Home Guard. Another amnesty was proclaimed on 21 November 1944, and again by the adoption of the Amnesty and Pardoning Act of 6 July 1945. Between 10,000-15,000 Chetniks were amnestied in this way, which accounted for about a third to a half of the Chetniks in Serbia at that time.

== Central Serbia ==
The number of victims in Central Serbia is estimated at 30,000. According to Milovan Đilas, before communist forces entered Belgrade, their leaders decided that followers of Serbia's former pro-Axis puppet Government of National Salvation should be liquidated immediately. According to communist leaders, Belgrade was the main center of Serbian reaction and, due to that, it was designed to be "very carefully cleansed from anti-communist elements". The establishment of communist administration was, therefore, followed by a brutal showdown with notable participants in the cultural, political and public life of the German-occupied territory of Serbia, and also with members of the rival Chetnik resistance movement who were defeated in a civil war.

== Vojvodina ==
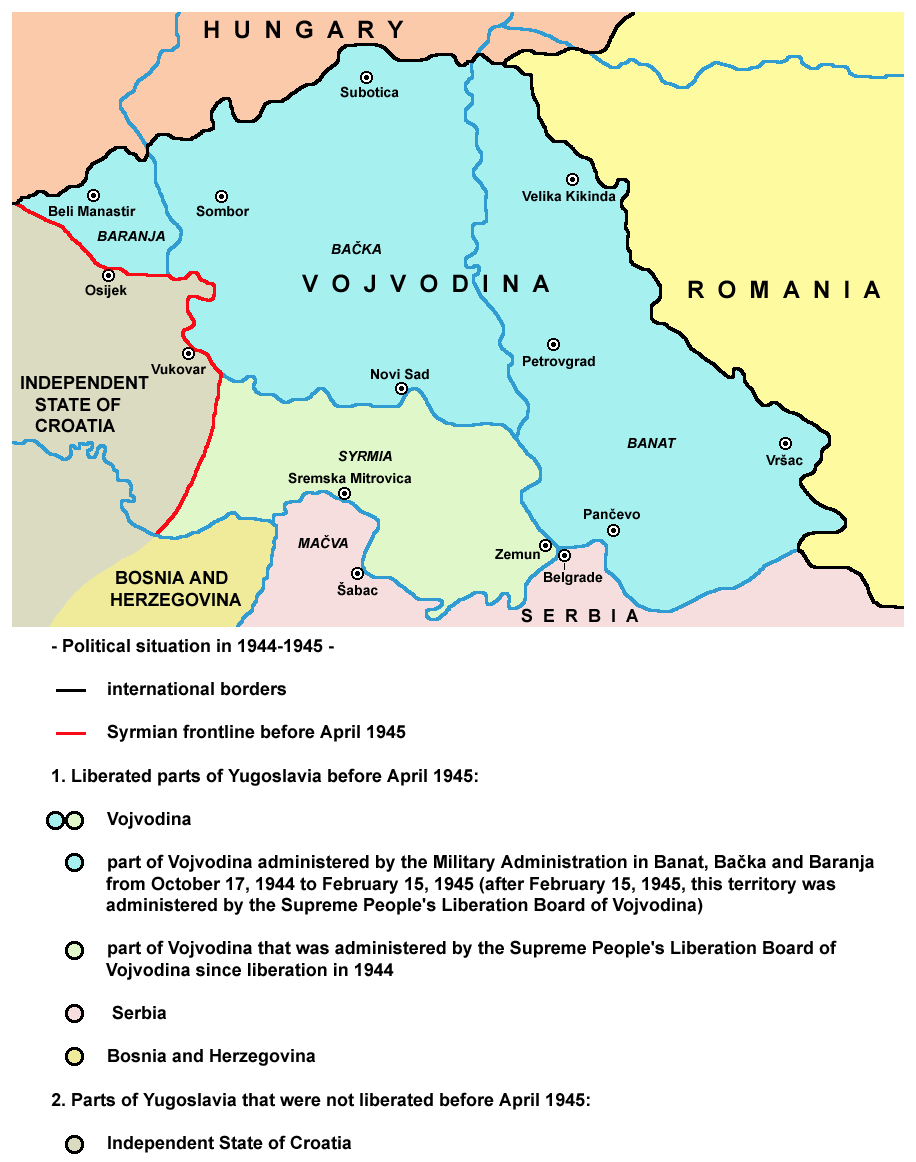
Military administration in Banat, Bačka and Baranja (1944–1945)

In Vojvodina (which then included Bačka, Banat, Baranja and Syrmia regions), most of the executions were performed during Military Administration in Banat, Bačka and Baranja, between October 1944 and January 1945.

=== Background ===
At the end of 1944, Axis troops were defeated by the Red Army and the whole of Vojvodina came under the control of the Yugoslav partisan forces. On 17 October 1944, by the order of Josip Broz Tito, the Banat, Bačka and Baranja regions were placed under military administration. About the establishment of this military government, Josip Broz Tito said the following: "The liberation of Bačka, Banat and Baranja requires the quickest possible return to normal life and the establishment of the people's democratic power in these territories. The specific circumstances under which these territories had to live during the occupation, and a mission to fully avert all adversities inflicted to our people by the occupying forces and foreign ethnic elements colonized here, requires that, in the beginning, we concentrate all power in order to mobilize the economy and carry on the war of liberation more successfully".

The partisan troops in Bačka had a very strict order, they had to "show the strongest possible determination against fifth columnists.

The term "fifth column" is applied to the subversive and resistant forces and organizations left behind by a retreating enemy. The National Committee for People's Liberation and the Red Army had agreed on the necessary cooperation in due time.

Brigadier General Ivan Rukavina was appointed commander of the military administration. He was in constant and direct contact with Tito, the supreme commander. In his first decree, he ordered his troops to "protect the national future and the South Slavic character of the territories" .

In the 28 October 1944 issue of Slobodna Vojvodina, the newspaper of the People's Liberation Front in Vojvodina, one member of the Regional Committee of the Communist Party of Yugoslavia summarized the intentions suggested from above, with the obvious aim to raise spirit for revenge by exaggerations and distortions:

Although we destroyed the occupying German and Hungarian hordes and drove them back to the west, we have not yet eradicated the roots of the poisonous weeds planted by them... The hundreds of thousands of foreigners who were settled on the territories where our ancestors had cleared the forests, drained the swamps, and created the conditions necessary for civilized life. These foreigners still kept shooting at our soldiers and the Soviet soldiers from the dark. They do everything they can to prevent the return to normal life, preparing, in the midst of this difficult situation, to stab us in the back again at the appropriate moment... The people feel that determined, energetic steps are needed to ensure the Yugoslav character of Bačka.

=== Ethnic composition of victims ===
==== Germans (Danube Swabians) ====
The estimated number range of Germans victims in Vojvodina is between 17,000 and 59,335. According to Friedrich Binder, the total number of the German victims in Yugoslavia was 56,736, of which 240 died while escaping in October 1944, 8,049 were executed by the Yugoslav partisans and 48,447 died in prison camps from starvation, illness and in the coldness.

Serbian State commission formed in 2009 established the list of 27.367 German victims in total.

Before World War II, the German population of Vojvodina numbered about 350,000 people. Between 160,000 and 200,000 were left after the withdrawal of Nazi forces. As a consequence of the World War II events in Yugoslavia, the collaboration with Nazi forces and committed war crimes of the German community the Yugoslav Communist government took a reprisals on ethnic citizens of German origin in Yugoslavia: they had their citizenship revoked, their belongings were taken by force, and they were forced to share their houses with ethnic Serb, Montenegrin, Croat and Macedonian refugees from other parts of Yugoslavia who were colonized in Vojvodina (houses of these refugees in other parts of Yugoslavia were mostly destroyed by German army during World War II).

Between 1944 and 1946, a prison camp system was established for all Vojvodina citizens of German origin in almost all settlements where they lived (see also: List of concentration and internment camps, Yugoslavia). In those camps, ethnic Germans were used as slave labor, they were tortured, beaten, and left to die from preventable illnesses and starvation. Some members of the German community were executed by Yugoslav Partisans in those camps. Yugoslav Partisans handed over some of the ethnic Germans to Soviet Red Army, who then took them to Siberia and used them for work in mines as slave labor. Some members of ethnic Germans of Vojvodina were expelled to Germany or Austria.

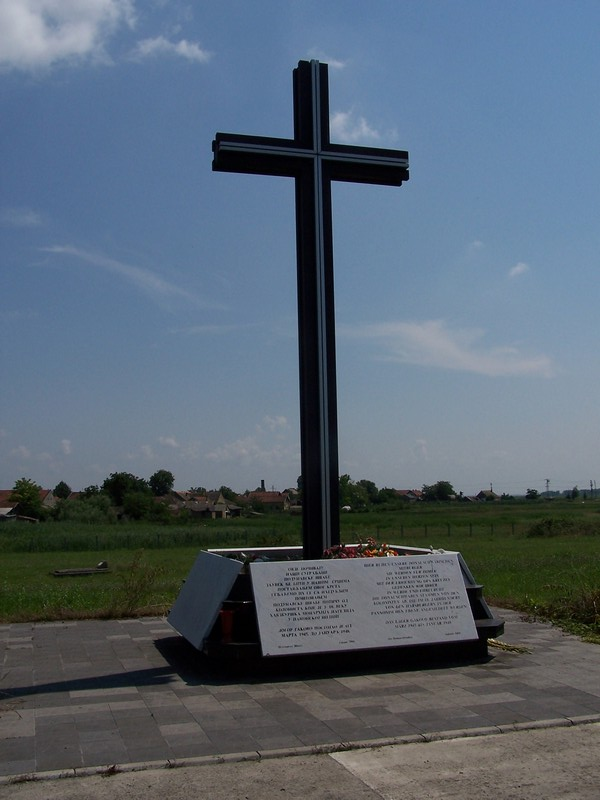
The German victims' memorial in Gakovo.

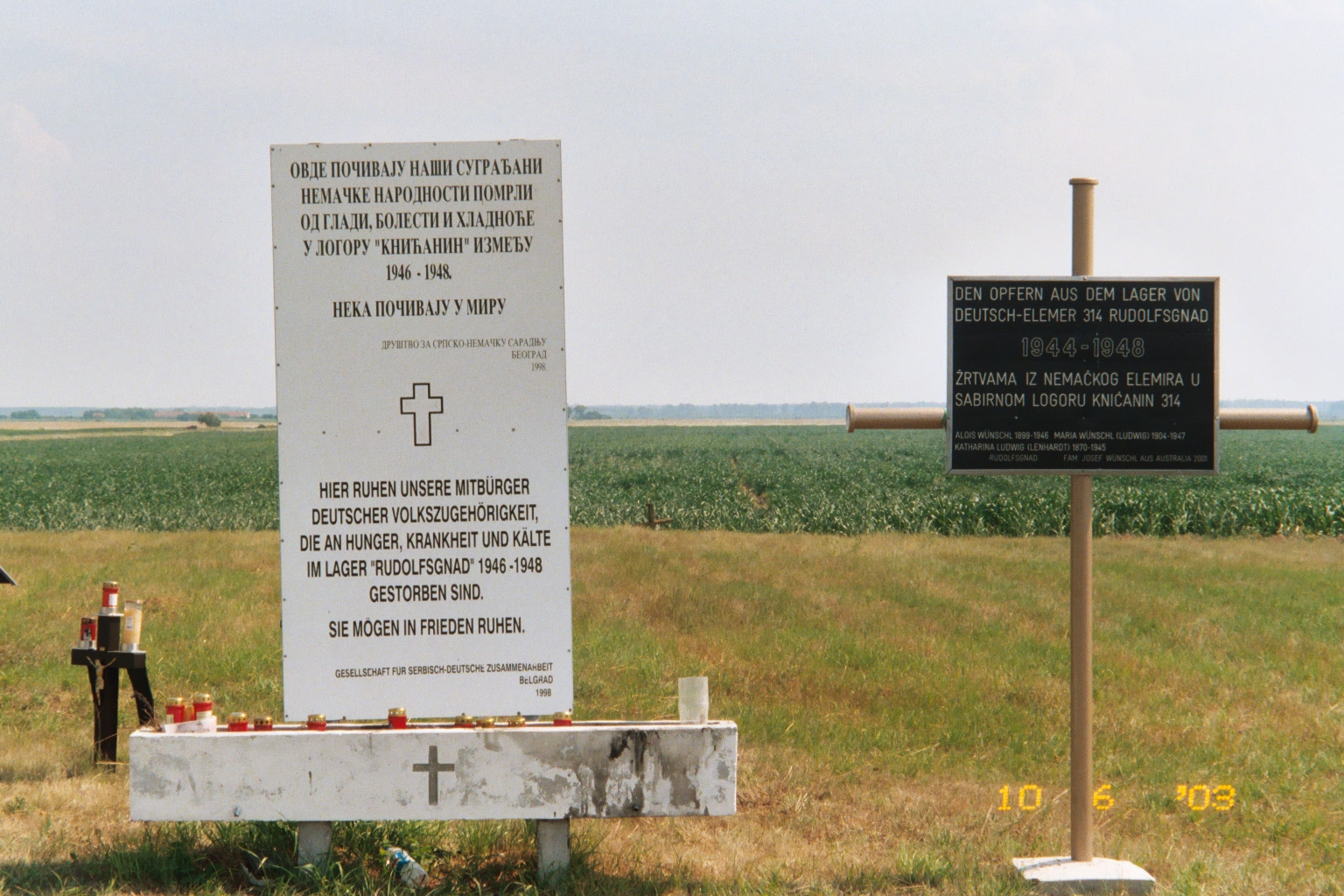
The German victims' memorial at the edge of the old German graveyard in Knićanin, dedicated to those who died of "hunger, disease, and cold", according to the sign.

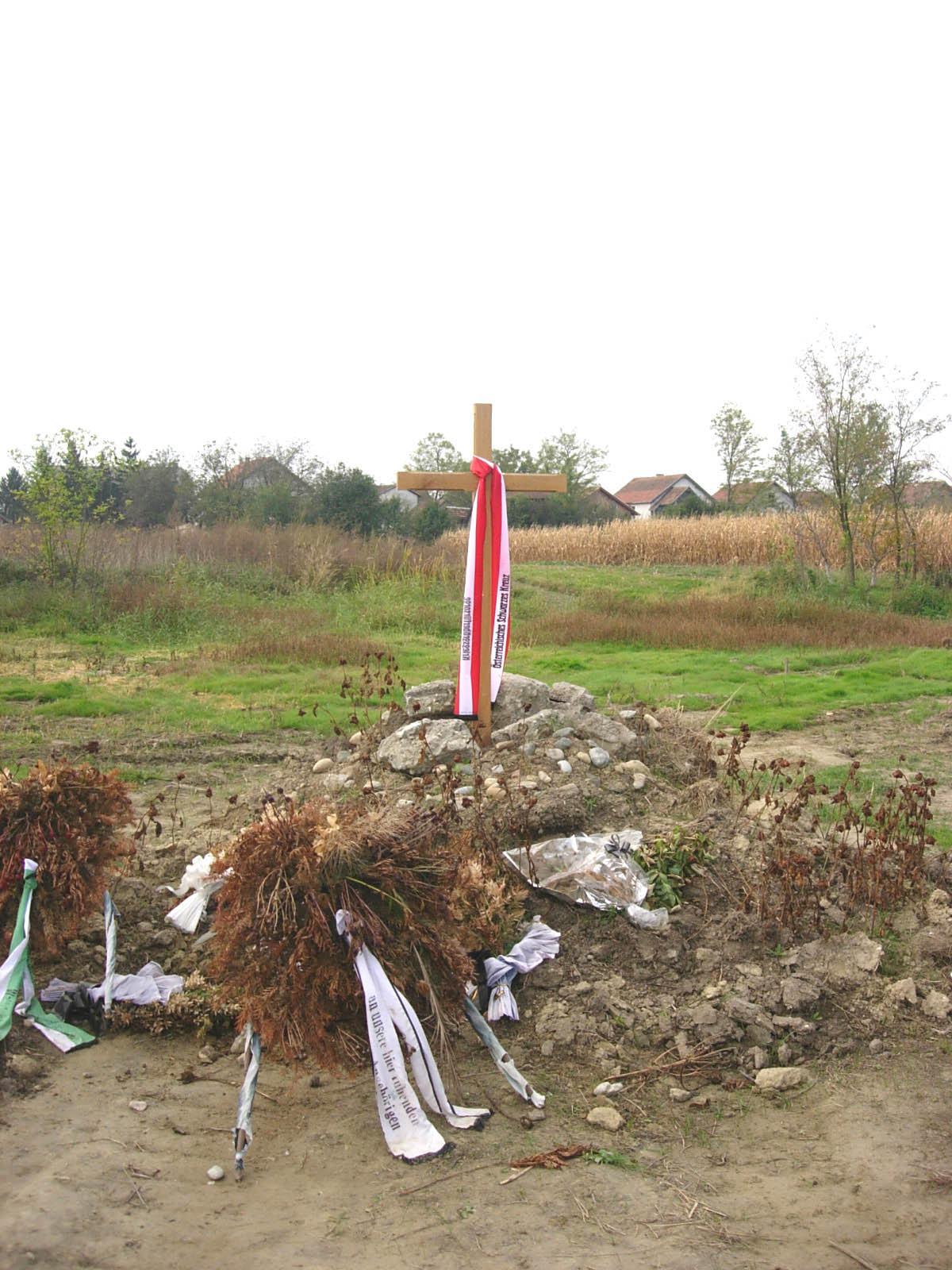
The German victims' memorial in Bački Jarak.

==== Serbs ====
After king Peter's speech via BBC on 12 September 1944, those Chetniks who didn't join Partisans became effectively outlaws. In time of the king's speech, Chetniks and Partisans were engaged in Battle of Jelova Gora, which ended with serious Chetnik defeat. Mihailović with his party fled to Bosnia, while smaller Chetnik groups remained in Serbia, hoping that Red Army would accept them as allies. When this did not materialize, those groups, joined by former Serbian State Guard, began retreat toward Bosnia through Sandžak, on flanks of retreating German Army Group E from Greece. On their route through Sandžak, Chetniks and Germans were harassed by Partisans and air raids from Allied Balkan Air Force.

The number of the Serb victims in Vojvodina is estimated at about 23,000–24,000 (According to the professor Dragoljub Živković, 47,000 ethnic Serbs were killed in Vojvodina between 1941 and 1948. About half of the Serb victims were killed by occupational forces and the other half of them were executed by post-war communist authorities).

In 1944, in Rajina Šuma near Novi Sad, partisans executed about 200–250 Serbs, who were accused that they sympathized with the Chetnik movement of Draža Mihajlović. They were buried into two mass graves, which were discovered in 1991 during communal works in that area. After the entry of partisan forces into Novi Sad on 23 October 1944, by the order of general Ivan Rukavina (who was a commandant of military area of Bačka and Baranja), mass arrests of respectable Serbs had begun. They mostly were reputable and rich householders, industrialists and intellectuals, who were seen as a possible threat for the new communist authorities. Order was carried out by the 11th Vojvodinian people's liberation brigade and most of the arrested citizens were executed until the middle of November.

Citizens who were executed included dr Miloš Petrović (former mayor), dr Obrad Milutinović (doctor and vice-president of Novi Sad municipality), Dragoljub Ristić (an industrialist), Pavle Tatić (one of the founders of Socialist Party in Novi Sad), Vojislav Matić (editor and publisher of "Nova Pošta" magazine in Serbian language), Miloš Kostić (footballer of FK Vojvodina), Svetislav Vilovski and Đurica Vlaović (members of Serbian Soko society), Milan – Peca Popović (intellectual and member of Rotary club), Jovan Begović (provincial clerk), Aleksandar Silber (economist), Pera Savić (journalist), Fedor Radić (doctor), and Gaja Gračanin (director of "Putnik" agency). Especially tragic fate is that of pre-war mayor dr Miloš Petrović, who was creditable for elevation of monument dedicated to Svetozar Miletić that still stands in the centre of Novi Sad, and who also helped in saving lives of hundreds of Serbs who were imprisoned in concentration camp "Šarvar" during Hungarian occupation.

State commission formed in 2009 after thorough investigation made a list of all victims, available on its official site. List includes a total of 14.567 Serb victims. 917 of them are from Vojvodina, and further 101 from Zemun.

==== Hungarians ====
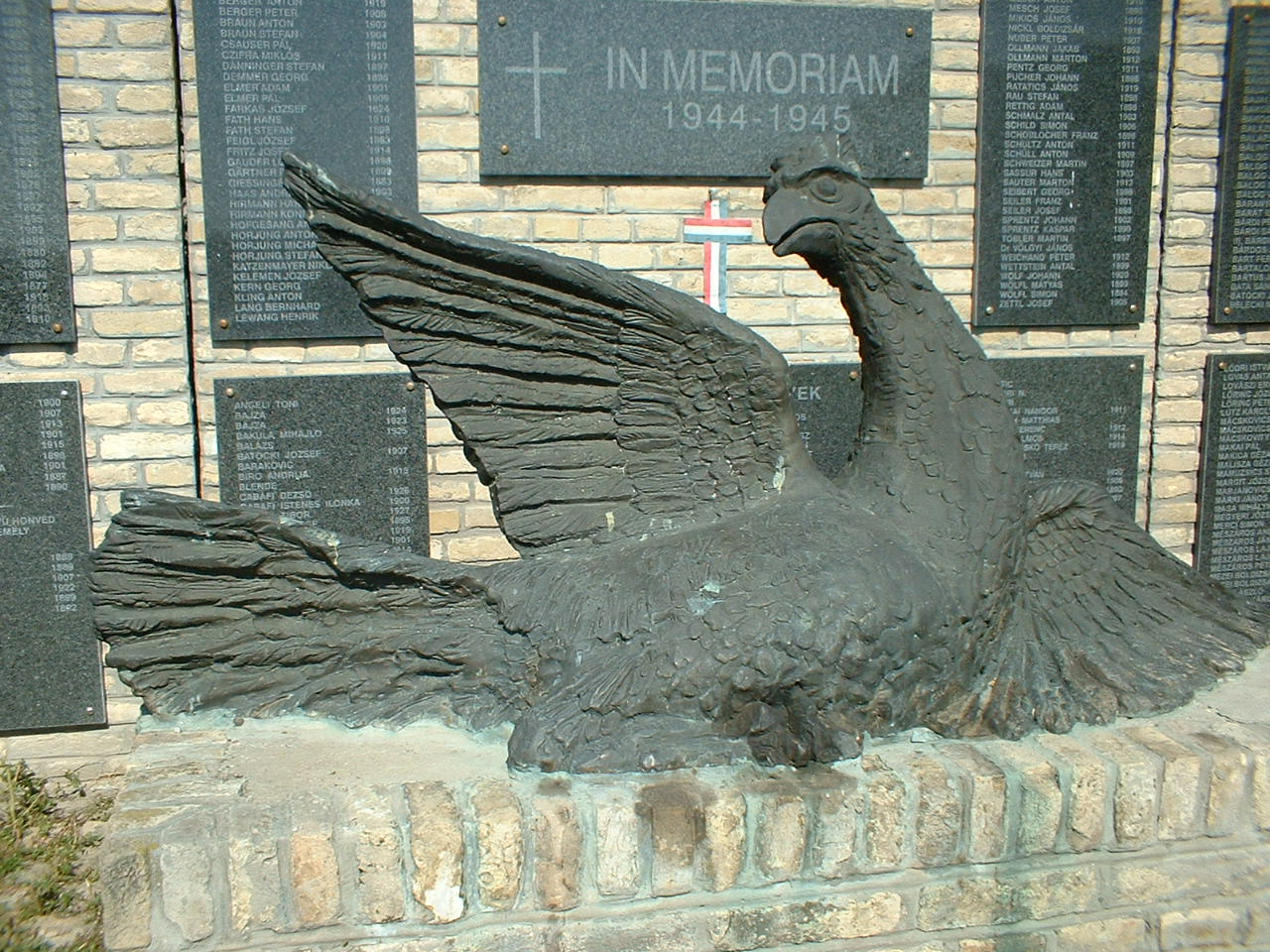
The Hungarian victims' memorial in Subotica cemetery, elevated for the 50th anniversary of the executions (1994). Behind: names of victims.

Various sources provide very different numbers of Hungarians executed in Vojvodina at that time. "The Book of Evidence of Killed War Criminals in 1944/1945" published in Yugoslavia states that a total of 1,686 people were executed in Bačka of which approximately 1,000 people were presumed to be Hungarians. However, the estimation of historian Kasaš tells 5,000 executed Hungarians.

According to other estimations, the number range of the executed Hungarians in Vojvodina may be between 40,000 and 50,000. Some sources claim that the most probable number of the executed Hungarians in Vojvodina was between 20,000 and 25,000, while others claim that it is about 35,000 (Cseres Tibor gives an exact estimate of 34,491 executed people).

Some Hungarian houses were sacked and a number of Hungarian civilians were executed and tortured. Some women and children were raped. Some men who were able to work were deported to Siberia.

People of Hungarian nationality are third in terms of the number of dead after the liberation, according to the 2014 data from Serbian state commission. In 2014 there were 6,112 registered persons (with 300 potential duplicate names), of which 589 are alleged to have disappeared (some of whom possibly fled to Hungary) and 279 died in camps. Unlike in Banat, in Bačka there were drastic punishment of members of the Hungarian national minority, especially those found, often on the basis of witness statements, that took direct or indirect involvement in the January 1942 raid and in the suffering of the Serbian population in April 1941. Members of Arrow Cross Party were especially targeted, as well as members of collaborationist apparatus, leadership of the DMKSZ (Cultural Union of the Hungarians of the Southern Territories that was also proclaimed to be a fascist organization), but also and others that were considered to fall under the category of associates of the occupiers. The largest number of people of Hungarian ethnicity died after the liberation of Vojvodina was recorded in places where, during the occupation, the Hungarian army and local Hungarians participated in mass crimes against the Serbian, Jewish and Roma population. The largest number of Hungarians killed was recorded in the region of Šajkaška (towns Žabalj, Čurug and Mošorin), which were affected by the January 1942 raid.

The attitude towards the Hungarians began to change from November 1944. The military administration of Banat, Bačka and Baranja warned that in some cases, especially in Bačka, mistakes were made and that the treatment of Germans was better than the Hungarians. In its instructions, it is pointed out that only those Hungarians who committed or incited crimes against the Slovene population were to be detained in the camps, and that Hungarians who did not fall into the category of war criminals should be released from camps. These guidelines are not accepted in all places with approval, especially in the Šajkaška region. In January and February 1945, some residents of Čurug and Mošorin demanded that all Germans and Hungarians should move out of these places, because their co-existence is impossible after events during the war. Almost the entire Hungarian population of Šajkaška was expelled and the largest number of detained in camps in Bački Jarak, Gajdobra and Mladenovo. Part was sent to Srem as a labor force in the preparation of the partisans for the breakthrough of the Syrmian Front and in repairing of the Belgrade-Zagreb railway. People detained in Bački Jarak were used as labor force for agricultural works. According to the book of the deceased from January to May 1945, due to poor conditions in the camp (maltreatment, hunger and disease), 66 adults and 55 children from the age of one month to 18 years have died.

Nevertheless, the Hungarian population was accepted into partisans ranks. At the time of these events, the 15th Vojvodina Shock Brigade "Sándor Petőfi" was formed from the Hungarians from area of Bačka Topola and Sombor. About ten thousand of Vojvodina Hungarians took part in the final operations for the liberation of Yugoslavia.

==== Rusyns ====
Some members of Rusyn (Ruthenian) population in Đurđevo were also targeted by partisan forces in 1944. According to Hungarian author Cseres, the majority of the Hungarian population of this village left with the retreating Hungarian army. The Yugoslav partisans then established control over this village and took their reprisals out on the Rusyns and Serbs who were sympathetic towards the Hungarians, the Serbian Royal Government or for their religious views. Several hundred Rusyns were executed and some prominent figures tortured.

Serbian State commission formed in 2009 established the list of 40 Rusyn victims in total.

== Aftermath ==
In June 2013, members of the Serbian Parliament adopted a declaration, which condemned the massacres and application of the principle of collective guilt against Hungarians in Vojvodina at the end of the Second World War. In response, the Hungarian President János Áder apologised in Belgrade for the war crimes committed against civilian Serbs and Jewish people during the Hungarian occupation of Yugoslav territories.

=== The history of investigations ===
==== I. The Federal Commission ("Državna komisija") – 1943 ====
Even in the midst of the storm of the war, at the second session of the AVNOJ in Jajce, November 1943, a decision was made for a special task force to be formed to investigate the crimes committed by fascists at the territory of Yugoslavia during the war. It was named "Federal Commission for determination of the crimes conducted by the Occupators and their helpers during World War 2" (in Serbian: Državna komisija za utvrđivanje zločina okupatora i njihovih pomagača iz Drugog svetskog rata), and it immediately started its work. In following five years broad investigation was conducted nationwide. It is said that until 1948, this official body collected over a million cases of war crime, documented and reported.

This investigation was very extensive, because the newly formed government wanted to collect the best possible set of data that can be presented in a demand for war reparations from Germany (both East and West), Italy, Bulgaria and Hungary – countries responsible for the attack on Yugoslavia and violation of its sovereignty. Although this nationwide program concentrated only on the victims of fascism (and rarely on the civilian innocent victims of communist reprisal), it plays an important part in the completing of the historical picture. Even though the assessment of its results, and its methodology for collecting data (mainly through civil reports of cases) would be different today, the work of this Commission is very important to the reconstruction of events, especially those that followed shortly after the war.

==== II. The Surveying Committee ("Anketni odbor") – 2001 ====
The first extensive study, and also the first ever attempt to systematically analyze the events that occurred between 1941 and 1948 on the territory of Serbia happened in 2001 on the initiative of the Assembly of the Autonomous province of Vojvodina (Skupština Autonomne pokrajine Vojvodine).

On 22 January 2001 in the building of the Assembly in Novi Sad, this governmental department formed a specialist group with a long name "Surveying Committee for investigation of the truth on the events that took place between 1941. until 1945. in Vojvodina" (Anketni odbor za utvrđivanje istine o događajima u periodu od 1941. do 1945. godine u Vojvodini) and this institution became a formal body of the Assembly of Autonomous province of Vojvodina.

This should be considered the first modern official investigation that took place after the Second World War, except for some studies done earlier in Slovenia. (There was also a Commission after the war, but it dealt only with the victims of 1941–1944.)

==== III. The Vojvodina Academy ("VANU") – 2004 ====
The work of the Assembly Committee was three years later taken over by Vojvodinian Academy of Sciences and Arts (VANU), where it was in a great deal extended. The Academy expanded the research for the period up to 1948, and to some extent even to 1952, processing 10 volumes with over 4000 pages of data.

The data was mainly collected from the Historic Archive of Vojvodina (Arhiv Vojvodine) and the raw data was kept in the Museum of Vojvodina. The results were first published on paper in 2008. under the title "On the way to the truth. Book of victims of AP Vojvodina 1941-1948" (title in Serbian: Na putu ka istini. Imenik stradalih stanovnika AP Vojvodine 1941-1948.) Because of the enormous amount of text, forming 9 volumes (8 of which just lists names of the victims) there was not enough money to publish it, so just 10 copies were printed. This makes this work inaccessible even to the researchers.

Although the results were raw and yet unstudied to detail, they were already shocking to the public.

Important step forward was the collecting of data about all known retention camps, and the victims of the period are classified by ethnic structure and also age and sex, as well as by the place of death. The weak point of this stage of the investigation was, because of the lack of material means, that about 20% of available data still remained unprocessed. As on the positive side, leader of the project dr. Dragoljub Živković claimed that much effort has been put and a lot of attention given to the task that there would be no duplicate entries.

The public was presented only with preliminary results, primarily through the media. The representatives said (and was briefly published) that in Bačka, Banat, Srem and Baranja, and also in other countries but from the territory of Vojvodina, between 1941. and 1948. a total of 86.881 civilians perished (above 40,000 Serbs, above 20,000 ethnic Germans, above 15,000 Jews, about 5,000 Hungarians, about 2,700 Croats, about 1000 Slovaks and about 3000 others). The full set of data with exact numbers is available in the published volume of the "Na putu ka istini. Imenik stradalih stanovnika AP Vojvodine 1941-1948".

It is important to say that this is not data that summarises victims of the 1944/45 communist purges, because it does not separates specifically the circumstances of death, but it is a raw list, with documents and literature, that was intended for future examination by experts. There is also an important statement that should be considered by the scholars of victimology, that this study showed independently that more than 12,000 inhabitants of Vojvodina, of different nationality ended up and were killed in Jasenovac and also in Banjica.

It is important to stress that the publication pertains only to the civilians (unarmed persons) that lost their lives in the period 1941–1948, in retention camps, through executions etc. and not to military personnel who died in battles during the war. Two very large, unfortunate numbers demonstrate this: among the persons who lost their lives the percentage of women (as compared to men) was 49,90% in Jews, and about 60% in the group of the ethnic Germans.

==== IV. The State Commission ("Državna komisija") – 2009 ====
On 9 July 2009 the government of Serbia founded a "Commission for the secret graves of victims killed after September 12, 1944" (Državna komisija za tajne grobnice ubijenih posle 12. septembra 1944. godine). The choice of the date is connected with the last stage of liberation from the occupator, when on 20 October 1944, with the help from the advancing Red Army, Belgrade was liberated. Soon after that the war activity ceased, but it marked a new period of sufferings. Even before the official declaration of the end of the war, atrocities against civilians that were assumed unsympathizing with communist rule started to happen. For example, in Vojvodina the first Hungarian victims were shot, some of them openly, convicted of being a fascist, in the middle of September 1944 in Bečej, where also the local German population was forced to wear white armbands as a sign that they will be sent to forced labor.

The mission of the 2009 Commission was to locate and mark all secret graves in which bodies of those shot after the 1944. liberation lay, and also to exhume them, for the purpose of determining the cause and investigation of the circumstances of death. The first exhumations took place in 2010, in the vicinity of Zaječar.

29 April of the same year marked a new era in the investigation of the 1944/45 events, as the government ruled a decision to remove the stamp of secrecy from the classified documents of the Archives, where the lists of liquidated persons and other important documents resided. Now the researchers were for the first time able to look at those papers. This was an important step forward, because this was the first time that a governmental investigation focused mainly at the victims of the "red terror".

==== V. The Academic Commission ("Međuakademska komisija") – 2010 ====
After the collecting of data from literature and archives to build a database, the phase of in-depth scientific study and analysis followed, which is still going on. For this purpose the governments of Hungary and Serbia agreed to establish a joint Commission. This separate task force, that officially formed 15, December 2010 in Belgrade, is called "Hungarian–Serbian academic Joint Committee for the civilian victims during and after the Second World War in Vojvodina, 1941-1948" (in Serbian: Mađarsko–Srpska Akademijska mešovita komisija; in Hungarian: Magyar–Szerb Akadémiai Vegyes Bizottság).

The Hungarian section of the Joint Committee held its inaugural meeting shortly after, at 6 January 2011. in Budapest.

=== Rehabilitation ===
It is expected that the first to be rehabilitated will be public figures, such as teachers, priests and Church dignitaries, those that were executed or persecuted with clear aim to intimidate the wider public through fear, by setting a harsh example. During the purges in Vojvodina, between 13 and 22 Catholic clerics were reported to be missing, 13 of whom proven to be dead (executed).

For example, if it was known or suspected that the priest was innocent, official forensic and court procedure was on the way. In some cases a memorial or a bust was already erected, even before the trial was completed.

== See also ==
- Allied war crimes during World War II
- Hungarian occupation of Baranja and Bačka, 1941–1944
- Foibe massacres
- Mass killings under communist regimes

== Bibliography ==
- Petranović, Branko (1992). Srbija u Drugom svetskom ratu 1939—1945 (Serbia in World War Two 1939-1945) (in Serbian). Belgrade: Vojnoizdavački i novinski centar.
- Kasaš, Aleksandar (1996). Mađari u Vojvodini 1941-1946 (Hungarians in Vojvodina 1941-1946) (in Serbian). Novi Sad: Filozofski Fakultet u Novom Sadu.
- Tomasevich, Jozo (1975). War and Revolution in Yugoslavia, 1941–1945: The Chetniks. Stanford: Stanford University Press. ISBN 978-0-8047-0857-9.
- Radanović, Milan (2014). Oslobođenje: Beograd, 20. oktobar 1944. (Liberation: Belgrade, October 20th, 1944). Beograd: Rosa Luxemburg Stiftung. ISBN 978-86-88745-15-4.
- Radanović, Milan (2015). Kazna i zločin: Snage kolaboracije u Srbiji (Punishment and Crime: Collaborationist forces in Serbia) (PDF). Beograd: Rosa Luxemburg Stiftung. ISBN 978-86-88745-15-4. Archived from the original (PDF) on 26 August 2016.
- Fifty thousand Hungarian martyrs report about the Hungarian Holocaust in Jugoslavia, 1944–1992 – ed. István Nyárádi, 1992
- Márton Matuska: Days of the revenge. Forum Publisher, Novi Sad, 1991
- Anton Salwetter: Heimatbuch Deutsch-Etschka. Reutlingen-Betzingen 1974.
- Erika Reusch-Meirer: Sigmundfelder Heimatbuch. Villingen-Schwenningen 1988.
- Documentation Project Committee: Genocide of the Ethnic Germans in Yugoslavia 1944–1948. Donauschwäbische Kulturstiftung, München 2003. ISBN 3-926276-47-9
