= XVII Waffen Corps of the SS (Hungarian) =

The XVII Waffen Corps of the SS (Hungarian) (German: XVII. Waffen-Armeekorps der SS) was a Waffen-SS corps during World War II. The formation of the corps was announced in March 1945 and was supposed to consist of Hungarians and Hungarian Volksdeutsche, but was never fully formed as an independent unit.

== History ==
The corps headquarters was established in March 1945 to oversee the formation of Hungarian SS units. But in the last months of the war, it was very difficult to create a new major military unit, so the "corps" consisted of a number of Hungarian units from the 25th Waffen Grenadier Division of the SS "Hunyadi" and the 26th Waffen Grenadier Division of the SS, assembled in the town of Burghausen. From Burghausen, the corps went into the interior of Austria. On 3 May, the last battle between the Hungarians and the Americans took place. The corps surrendered the next day.

== Commanders ==
- SS-Obergruppenführer and General of the SS Ferenc Feketehalmy-Czeydner (March – April 1945)
- SS-Obergruppenführer and SS General Jenö Ruszkay (April – May 1945)

== Sources ==
- Lexikon-der-wehrmacht
- Axishistory
- Rolf Stoves: Die gepanzerten und motorisierten deutschen Großverbände 1935—1945, Nebel-Verlag, 2003, ISBN 3-89555-102-3
