= Seventeenth of the month =

Recurring ordinal calendar date

The seventeenth of the month or seventeenth day of the month is the recurring calendar date position corresponding to the day numbered 17 of each month. In the Gregorian calendar (and other calendars that number days sequentially within a month), this day occurs in every month of the year, and therefore occurs twelve times per year.

- Seventeenth of January
- Seventeenth of February
- Seventeenth of March
- Seventeenth of April
- Seventeenth of May
- Seventeenth of June
- Seventeenth of July
- Seventeenth of August
- Seventeenth of September
- Seventeenth of October
- Seventeenth of November
- Seventeenth of December

In addition to these dates, this date occurs in months of many other calendars, such as the Bengali calendar and the Hebrew calendar.

== See also ==
- Seventeenth (disambiguation)
