= 26th Waffen Grenadier Division of the SS (2nd Hungarian) =

German infantry division

- Divisional insignia
- Active: 1944–1945
- Country: Nazi Germany
- Branch: Waffen-SS
- Type: Infantry
- Size: Division

Commanders
- Notable commanders: László Deák; József Grassy

The 26th Waffen Grenadier Division of the SS (2nd Hungarian) (German: 26. Waffen-Grenadier-Division der SS (ungarische Nr.2), Hungarian: 26. Waffen-SS Gránátos Hadosztály (2. magyar)), was a short-lived infantry division of the Waffen-SS, an armed branch of the German Nazi Party that served alongside but was never formally part of the Wehrmacht during World War II. Established in November 1944 following the German overthrow of the Hungarian regime of Miklós Horthy, it was never properly formed, trained, or equipped, and after being evacuated from its training camp in the face of the advancing Soviet Red Army, it surrendered to the United States Army in Austria in May 1945.

== History ==
The division was authorised in November 1944, following the German overthrow of the Hungarian regime of Miklós Horthy, and was designated the 26th Waffen Grenadier Division of the SS (2nd Hungarian) (26. Waffen Grenadier Division der SS (ungarische Nr.2.)) on 27 December 1944. By the time it was given this designation, it had reached a strength of 8,000, comprising 3,000 former Royal Hungarian Army troops, along with 5,000 civilian conscripts. The division was sent to be trained and equipped at Schieratz in Reichsgau Wartheland (German-annexed Poland). By this time, it had a "paper" strength of 13,000, of which 10,000 were civilian conscripts yet to be issued weapons or uniforms. In early January 1945, it was issued with some heavy weapons, but these were confiscated by elements of the German 9th Army to help them oppose the Soviet Red Army's Vistula–Oder Offensive launched in mid-January. Around the same time, while scavenging for food, members of the division came under occasional attack by elements of the Polish Home Army. According to some sources, the division was granted the title Hungaria on 29 January 1945.

With the approach of the Soviet forces, the division retreated behind the Oder, suffering around 2,500 casualties. The unit then joined its sister division, the 25th Waffen Grenadier Division of the SS Hunyadi (1st Hungarian) at its training camp, Neuhammer. Further Soviet advances resulted in the division being evacuated, along with its sister division, to Austria. Elements of the division joined a kampfgruppe left behind as a rearguard at Neuhammer, which was destroyed. During 3–5 May 1945, the remaining elements of the division surrendered to the U.S. Third Army near the Attersee. No special insignia was manufactured for the division.

== Commanders ==
The division was commanded by the following officers:

- November 1944 – January 1945
  - SS-Standartenführer Rolf Tiemann
  - Waffen-Oberführer Zoltan Pisky
  - SS-Oberführer László Deák
- January – March 1945
  - SS-Brigadeführer Berthold Maack
- March – May 1945
  - Waffen-Gruppenführer József Grassy

== Order of battle ==
The division consisted of the following principal units:

- 64th Waffen-Grenadier Regiment of the SS
- 65th Waffen-Grenadier Regiment of the SS
- 66th Waffen-Grenadier Regiment of the SS
- 26th Waffen-Artillerie Regiment of the SS
  - 26th Waffen Ski Battalion of the SS
  - 26th SS-Panzer Battalion

== See also ==
- List of German divisions in World War II
- List of Waffen-SS divisions
- List of SS personnel
- Table of ranks and insignia of the Waffen-SS
- Waffen-SS foreign volunteers and conscripts
