= 13th Infantry Brigade (Hungary) =

- Hungarian: 13. gyalogdosztály
- Active: 1939–44
- Disbanded: November 1944
- Country: Kingdom of Hungary
- Branch: Royal Hungarian Army
- Type: Infantry
- Part of: V Corps

The 13th Infantry Brigade was a formation of the Royal Hungarian Army that participated in the Axis invasion of Yugoslavia during World War II.

== Organization ==
Structure of the division:

- Headquarters
- 7th Infantry Regiment
- 37th Infantry Regiment
- 13th Artillery Regiment
- 13th Independent Cavalry Squadron
- 13th Anti-Aircraft Battery
- 13th Signal Company
- 13th Service Regiment
- Attached Mining Section

== Commanders ==
13th Infantry Brigade (Hungarian: 13. gyaloghadosztály)

- Brigadier General Gyula Nagy (23 Jan 1939 - 1 Mar 1940)
- Brigadier General Pál Platthy (1 Mar 1940 - 17 Feb 1942)

13th Light Division (Hungarian: 13. könnyűhadosztály)

- Brigadier General Pál Platthy (17 Feb 1942 - 1 Apr 1942)
- Brigadier General József Grassy (1 Apr 1942 - 15 Nov 1942)
- Brigadier General László Hollósy-Kuthy (15 Nov 1942 - 1 Feb 1943)
- None (1 Feb 1943 - 15 May 1943)
- Brigadier General Frigyes Vasváry (15 May 1943 - 10 Aug 1943)

13th Infantry Division (Hungarian: 13. gyalogdosztály)

- Brigadier General Károly Ungár (10 Aug 1943 - ? Mar 1944)
- Colonel János Markóczy (30 Mar 1944 - 1 Apr 1944)
- Brigadier General Dr. Gygula Hankovszky (1 Apr 1944 - 16 Oct 1944)
- Brigadier General Jénö Sövényházi-Herdiczky (16 Oct 1944 - 20 Dec 1944)
- Colonel Sándor Vályi (20 Dec 1944 - 27 Nov 1944)
