= 17 Brigade (Nigeria) =

Military formation of the Nigerian Army

- Active: 20 February 2018-present
- Country: Nigeria
- Branch: Nigerian Army
- Role: Internal security
- Size: Brigade
- Part of: 8 Division
- Garrison/HQ: Natsinta Cantonment, Katsina
- Engagements: Boko Haram insurgency Northern Mali War; Nigerian bandit conflict

Commanders
- Commander: Brigadier General Ishaya Ibrahim

The 17 Brigade is a military formation of the Nigerian Army, which was established on 20 February 2018 for internal security duties.

== History ==
The 17 Brigade was established in December 2017, but was officially commissioned in February 2018. According to Army chief of staff Lieutenant General Tukur Yusuf Buratai, the establishment of the 17 Brigade is part of a wider reorganisation of the Nigerian Army.

== Mission ==
According to Lieutenant General Buratai, the 17 Brigade was established in order to address issues in the North-West Zone and in the Katsina State identified by the Nigerian Army: cattle rustling, armed robbery and armed banditry. Countering such threats includes carrying out public security duties.

== Commanders ==
- Brigadier General L. T. Omoniyi (December 2017 – ?)
- Brigadier General Aminu Bande (? - September 10, 2019)
- Brigadier General W. B. Idris (September 2019 – ?)
- Brigadier General Emmanuel Eric Emekah (? - January 2022)
- Brigadier General Ibikunle Ajose (January 2022 – July 2023)
- Brigadier General Oluremi Fadairo (Prior to August 4, 2023 - August 22, 2024)
- Brigadier General Babatunde Omapariola (August 22, 2024 – January 16, 2026)
- Brigadier General Ishaya Ibrahim (January 16, 2026 – Present)

== See also ==
- Nigerian Army
- Katsina State
