= 17th National Congress of the Kuomintang =

The 17th National Congress of the Kuomintang (Chinese: 中國國民黨第十七次全國代表大会) was the seventeenth national congress of the Kuomintang, held on 19–20 August 2005 at Sun Yat-sen Memorial Hall in Taipei, Taiwan.

== See also ==
- Kuomintang
