= Seventeenth Amendment =

The Seventeenth Amendment may refer to the:

- Seventeenth Amendment of the Constitution of India, 1964 amendment relating to the acquisition of property by government
- Seventeenth Amendment of the Constitution of Ireland, relating to cabinet confidentiality
- Seventeenth Amendment to the Constitution of Pakistan, granting more power to the President of Pakistan
- Seventeenth Amendment of the Constitution of South Africa, restructuring the judicial system
- Seventeenth Amendment to the United States Constitution, providing for the direct election of Senators
