= Turan Hunters =

Hungarian fascist paramilitary organization

Association of Turanian Hunters (Hungarian: Turáni Vadászok) were Hungarian fascist paramilitary organization founded in 1927 by Gyula Gömbös after the defeat of Austro-Hungary in World War I The ideology of the organisation included restoration of Hungary to its pre-Trianon borders, racism (in form of Hungarian Turanism), anticommunism and antisemitism. It is estimated that the organisation at its peak in 1944 had approximately 43,000 members in some 1200 settlements.

In occupied Bácska, branches of this organisation were founded especially after the Újvidék raid of 1942.

Turanists organisations were opposed to German National Socialism, considering Aryan race inferior. When Nazi Germany occupied Hungary in 1944 in Operation Margarethe in order to prevent Hungary to join Western Allies, there were clashes between Hungarians and the German population. When Turanian hunters armed themselves to defend Hungarianism, they were intermediately disarmed by the Wehrmacht. Newly appointed Minister of Interior Andor Jaross decided to disband the organisation. However, it was officially disestablished only in 1949.

After Yugoslav partisans and the Red Army liberated territories previously occupied by Hungary, some former members of the Turanian hunters were executed.

== Literature ==
- Janos, Andrew C. (20 January 2012). The Politics of Backwardness in Hungary, 1825-1945. Princeton University Press. ISBN 978-1-4008-4302-2.
- Kasaš, Aleksandar (1996). Mađari u Vojvodini 1941-1946 (Hungarians in Vojvodina 1941-1946) (in Serbian). Novi Sad: Filozofski Fakultet u Novom Sadu.
