= 17th Congress =

17th Congress may refer to:

- 17th Congress of the All-Union Communist Party (Bolsheviks) (1934)
- 17th Congress of the Philippines (2016–2019)
- 17th National Congress of the Chinese Communist Party (2007)
- 17th National Congress of the Kuomintang (2005)
- 17th United States Congress (1821–1823)

== See also ==
- 17th Legislative Assembly (disambiguation)
