= 17th Legislative Assembly =

17th Legislative Assembly may refer to:

- 17th Legislative Assembly of Bihar, from 2020 to 2025
- 17th Legislative Assembly of British Columbia, from 1929 to 1933
- 17th Legislative Assembly of Manitoba, from 1923 to 1927
- 17th Legislative Assembly of Ontario, from 1926 to 1929
- 17th Legislative Assembly of Puerto Rico, from 2013 to 2017
- 17th Legislative Assembly of Quebec, from 1927 to 1931
- 17th Legislative Assembly of Saskatchewan, from 1971 to 1975
- 17th Legislative Assembly of Uttar Pradesh, from 2017 to 2022

== See also ==
- 17th Congress (disambiguation)
- 17th Dáil, from 1961 to 1965
- 17th Seanad, from 1983 to 1987
