= 17th Reconnaissance Squadron (disambiguation) =

17th Reconnaissance Squadron is United States Air Force unit, so named from March 2003 to May 2016.

17th Reconnaissance Squadron may also refer to:

- 867th Attack Squadron, designated the '17th Reconnaissance Squadron (Light)' from January 1941 to August 194
- 407th Air Refueling Squadron, designated the '17th Reconnaissance Squadron (Heavy)' from March 1942 to April 1942
- 17th Special Operations Squadron, designated the '17th Reconnaissance Squadron (Bombardment)' from April 1943 to April 1946

== See also ==
- 17th Photographic Reconnaissance Squadron
- 17th Tactical Reconnaissance Squadron
