= László Deák =

Hungarian collaborator (1891–1946)

- Born: 1 July 1891; Eger, Austria-Hungary
- Died: 5 November 1946 (aged 55); Yugoslavia
- Cause of death: Execution by hanging
- Military career
- Rank: SS-Oberführer
- Commands: 26th Waffen Grenadier Division of the SS (2nd Hungarian) (23 January 1944 – 29 January 1945)

László Deák (1 July 1891 – 5 November 1946) was a Hungarian army officer who served in World War I and World War II. He was accused and convicted of war crimes due to his involvement in the massacre of Serbian and Jewish civilians during the Axis armies' invasion of Yugoslavia. He was sentenced to death by hanging and was executed in 1946.

== Military record ==
In the years 1906–1909 Deák was a student at the School of Infantry in Sopron. In 1912 he graduated from the Royal Military Academy "Ludovika" as a Lieutenant, accepting a post to the Royal Hungarian Honvéd's 19 Infantry Regiment, stationed in Peczu. He took part in the First World War, and after the war he joined the Hungarian Army. He rose to the rank of colonel.

As a Honvéd Colonel who had participated in the 1942 raid in southern Bačka or "Razzia" in January 1942 in the Bačka region. In August 1942, he was pensioned and retired from the army due to his role in the massacres of Serbian and Jewish civilians during the 1942 raid in Vojvodina in present-day Serbia. In August 1943, he was formally accused of committing war crimes during the Razzia.

On 2 February 1944, he was assigned to the Bánát where he joined the Waffen-SS. He was made a Waffen-Oberführer der SS and commanded the SS Kampfgruppe Deak in Vojvodina. In November, 1944, he was attached to the 25th Waffen Grenadier Division der SS "Hunyadi" and was appointed commander of the 61 Waffen Grenadier Regiment der SS. The Deák SS Battlegroup consisted of approximately 1,000 men in three infantry companies, a heavy weapons platoon, and a signals platoon. It was engaged in defensive military operations in Bachka and the Bánát. It fought against advancing Red Army troops at Novi Sad.

== Conviction and execution ==
After World War II, Deák was extradited to Yugoslavia to face war crimes charges. In supporting a Nazi-occupied Hungary, he was accused of committing war crimes against Serbian civilians in Vojvodina.

Deák was sentenced to death by hanging by the Vojvodina Supreme Court on 31 October 1946 for the mass murder of civilians in Novi Sad in January 1942, during a series of massacres in southern Bačka. He was executed on 4 or 5 November 1946 in Vojvodina, along with Field Marshal Ferenc Szombathelyi and József Grassy.
