= 17th Street =

Seventeenth Street may refer to:

- 17th Street (Atlanta), Georgia
- 17th Street (Manhattan), New York
- Cropsey Avenue or West 17th Street, Brooklyn, New York
- 17th Street (album), a 2011 album by Hammers of Misfortune

== See also ==
- 17th Street Bridge (Vero Beach, Florida), Indian River County, Florida
- 17th Street Canal, New Orleans, Louisiana
- 17th Street Plaza, Denver Colorado
- 17th Street West Bridge, Huntington, West Virginia
