= 17th Avenue =

17th Avenue or 17 Av may refer to:

- International Avenue, Calgary, Alberta, Canada
- 17th Avenue (Brooklyn), New York, United States
- 17 Av, the seventeenth day of Av, the fifth month of the Hebrew calendar
