= 17th Infantry Battalion =

17th Battalion or 17th Infantry Battalion may refer to:

- 17th Battalion (Australia), a unit of the Australian Army which was initially formed in the First Australian Imperial Force
- 2/17th Battalion (Australia), a unit of the Australian Army that served within the Second Australian Imperial Force
- 17th Infantry Battalion (Philippines), a unit of the Philippine Army
