= 17 Squadron =

17 Squadron or 17th Squadron may refer to:

- No. 17 Squadron IAF, a unit of the Indian air force
- No. 17 Squadron PAF, a unit of the Pakistan Air Force
- No. 17 Squadron RAF, a unit of the United Kingdom Royal Air Force
- No. 17 Squadron RAAF, a unit of the Royal Australian Air Force
- No. 17 Squadron RNZAF, a unit of the Royal New Zealand Air Force
- No. 17 Squadron RSAF, a unit of the Royal Saudi Air Force
- 17 Squadron SAAF, a unit of the South African Air Force
- 17th Aero Squadron, a unit of the United States Army Air Service
- 17th Air Squadron, a unit of the Indonesian Air Force
- 17th Airlift Squadron, a unit of the United States Air Force
- 17th Attack Squadron, a unit of the United States Air Force
- 17th Construction Squadron, a unit of the Royal Australian Army
- 17th Electronic Warfare Squadron, a unit of the United States Air Force
- 17th Expeditionary Space Control Squadron, a unit of the United States Air Force
- 17th Frigate Squadron, a unit of the Royal Navy
- 17th Operational Weather Squadron, a unit of the United States Air Force
- 17th Reconnaissance Squadron (disambiguation), units of the United States Air Force
- 17th Special Tactics Squadron, a unit of the United States Air Force
- 17th Test and Evaluation Squadron, a unit of the United States Space Force
- 17th Training Squadron a unit of the United States Air Force
- 17th Weapons Squadron, a unit of the United States Air Force
- Submarine Squadron 17, a unit of the United States Navy
- VPB-17 (Patrol Bombing Squadron 17), a unit of the United States Navy

== See also ==
- 17th Division (disambiguation)
- 17th Brigade (disambiguation)
- 17th Regiment (disambiguation)
