= 17th Brigade =

17th Brigade may refer to:

== Australia ==
- 17th Brigade (Australia)
- 17th Sustainment Brigade (Australia)

== China ==
- 17th Garrison Brigade (People's Republic of China)

== India ==
- 17th Indian Infantry Brigade
- 17th (Ahmednagar) Brigade

== Indonesia ==
- 17th Airborne Raider Infantry Brigade

== Iran ==
- 17th Brigade of Qom

== Libya ==
- February 17th Martyrs Brigade

== Nigeria ==
- 17 Brigade (Nigeria)

== Spain ==
- 17th Mixed Brigade

== South Korea ==
- 17th Infantry Brigade (South Korea)

== Soviet Union ==
- 17th Guards Mechanised Brigade

== Ukraine ==
- 17th Heavy Mechanized Brigade
- 17th Poltava Brigade

== United Kingdom ==
- 17th Infantry Brigade (United Kingdom)
- 17th Mounted Brigade (United Kingdom)
- 17th Reserve Brigade

=== Artillery units ===
- 17th Brigade Royal Field Artillery
- XVII Brigade, Royal Horse Artillery, formerly II Indian Brigade, Royal Horse Artillery

== United States ==
- 17th Aviation Brigade
- 17th Field Artillery Brigade
- 17th Sustainment Brigade (United States)

== Uzbekistan ==
- 17th Air Assault Brigade

== See also ==
- 17th Division (disambiguation)
- 17th Regiment (disambiguation)
- 17 Squadron (disambiguation)
