= 105th Division (2nd Formation) (People's Republic of China) =

105th Division (1951-52) 17th Public Security Division (1952-57) 17th Garrison Brigade (1957-58)
- Active: 1951.2 - 1958.1
- Country: People's Republic of China
- Branch: People's Liberation Army
- Type: Division
- Role: Infantry
- Garrison/HQ: Taizhou, Zhejiang
- Engagements: Chinese Civil War

The 105th Division(Chinese: 第105师)(2nd Formation) was activated on February 26, 1951 from elements from the former 103rd Division and 104th Division. The division was composed of:

- 313th Infantry Regiment (former 310th Regiment, 104th Division);
- 314th Infantry Regiment (former 311th Regiment, 104th Division);
- 315th Infantry Regiment (former 307th Regiment, 103rd Division).

In January 1952 the division moved onto Dongtou Island along with its 315th Infantry Regiment. In June the division was reorganized as 17th Public Security Division(Chinese: 公安第17师). All its regiments were redesignated as follow:

- 49th Garrison Regiment (former 313th Infantry);
- 50th Garrison Regiment (former 314th Infantry);
- 51st Garrison Regiment (former 315th Infantry).

The division was a part of Public Security Troops of the Huadong Military Region, with a total number of 3135 personnel.

On October 8-9, 1952, 50th Garrison Regiment, 17th Garrison Division took part in the engagement with Republic of China Army People's Anti-Communist National Salvation Army of Jiang-Zhe Provinces in Jiguanshan and Yangyu islands in Yuhuan, Zhejiang, which ended with a defeat: 192 were lost among 267 troops landed on Jiguanshan from 50th Garrison Regiment.

From July 1955 the division was transferred to Zhejiang Provincial Military District's control.

In January 1957, the division was reduced to 17th Garrison Brigade(Chinese: 守备第17旅). The brigade was composed of 51st Garrison Regiment, three independent infantry battalions and 4 artillery battalions, with a total of 4408 personnel.

In January 1958 the brigade was inactivated and absorbed into Wenzhou Military Sub-district:

- 51st Garrison Regiment was redesignated as 84th Garrison Regiment;
- All other independent battalions were reorganized into the new 85th Garrison Regiment.
