= 17th Regiment of Light Dragoons (1759) =

c. 1760 painting of a regimental private

The 17th Regiment of Light Dragoons was a light cavalry regiment of the British Army raised in 1759 and disbanded in 1763. It was raised in Scotland by Captain Lord Aberdour in 1759, for service in the Seven Years' War, and disbanded following the Treaty of Paris in 1763.
