= József Grassy =

Hungarian Army officer, SS-Gruppenführer and war criminal

- Born: 31 December 1894; Szőlős, Austria-Hungary
- Died: 5 November 1946 (age 51); Žabalj, Yugoslavia
- Military career
- Allegiance: Austria-Hungary; Kingdom of Hungary
- Branch: Austro-Hungarian Army; Royal Hungarian Army; Waffen-SS
- Service years: 1912-1918; 1919-1945
- Rank: SS-Gruppenführer and Generalleutnant of the Waffen-SS
- Unit: 20th Royal Hungarian Honvéd Infantry Regiment
- Commands: 25th Waffen Grenadier Division; 26th Waffen Grenadier Division
- Conflicts: World War I World War II
- Awards: Iron Cross, 1st and 2nd class

József Grassy (31 December 1894 – 5 November 1946) was a Hungarian military officer in the Royal Hungarian Army who, in the Second World War, commanded Hungarian divisions as an SS-Gruppenführer and Generalleutnant of the Waffen-SS. After the war, he was convicted of war crimes and executed.

== Early life ==
Grassy was born in the Hungarian town of Szőlős (today part of Bratislava). Originally of Italian extraction, the family name had been Grassi. After education in Catholic schools, he attended the Royal Hungarian Infantry Cadet School in Sopron from 1908 to 1912 and entered military service with the Austro-Hungarian Army. In 1914 he graduated from the Ludovika Royal Military Academy in Budapest as a Lieutenant and participated in the First World War as a platoon and company commander on the eastern front. He served with the 20th Royal Hungarian Honvéd Infantry Regiment throughout the war, was wounded twice and decorated for gallantry. During the last year of the war, he served as a general staff officer on the Italian front.

== Hungarian army career ==
After the end of the war, Grassy joined the Royal Hungarian Army and helped to overthrow the Hungarian Soviet Republic of Bela Kun in 1919. He then served in a number of staff and command positions. From 1919 to 1921, he was an instructor at the military academy. He was a staff officer in the 1st Hungarian Infantry Regiment "Maria Theresia" from 1922 to 1929, and became the regimental commander from August 1929 to December 1932. Between 1932 and 1939, he served as Chief of Staff at the brigade and corps levels, and as military tactics instructor at the military academy. Grassy steadily rose through the ranks, attaining the rank of colonel in November 1938. He was the commander of Infantry Regiment 7 from August 1939 to December 1940. Taking up a general staff position in the aviation section of the Defense Ministry in January 1941, he became Chief of the Air Force Organization Bureau on 1 March 1941.

== Second World War ==
Hungary had joined the Axis powers on 20 November 1940 by signing the Tripartite Pact, and participated in the invasions of Yugoslavia and the Soviet Union in the spring of 1941. In August 1941, Grassy left his general staff post and was given command of the 15th Royal Hungarian Infantry Brigade, which would be redesignated the 15th Light Division on 17 February 1942. In January 1942, in an ostensible anti-partisan operation, Grassy directed the arrest of over 7,000 people in Bačka, that part of Yugoslavia annexed by Hungary. Known as the Novi Sad massacre, this resulted in the murder of approximately 3,800 men, women and children, mainly Serbs and Jews. In an operation that lasted several days, victims were machine-gunned to death and, by some accounts, were made to walk out on the frozen Danube river which was then shelled with artillery, resulting in mass drownings. In April 1942, Grassy was promoted to major general and took command of the 13th Light Division. He led this division in actions on the eastern front against the Red Army until 15 November 1942. He later returned to the general staff, where he became head of training.

Following reports of the Novi Sad massacre, the Hungarian government ordered an investigation. In December 1943, the general staff convened a special court to try Grassy along with 14 other defendants. According to the established military code, the senior officers were left free on parole and not taken into pretrial detention. Grassy was found guilty, and received a sentence of fourteen years imprisonment and dismissal from the army. However, he violated his parole by fleeing to Vienna and requesting political asylum with three other convicted defendants in January 1944.

On 1 March 1944, Grassy joined the 9th SS Panzer Division Hohenstaufen with the rank of SS-Brigadeführer and Generalmajor of the Waffen-SS. Sent to Budapest following the occupation of Hungary by German forces, he was involved in the deportation of Hungarian Jews that was organized by Adolf Eichmann. In October 1944, he led the staff charged with forming the 25th Waffen Grenadier Division of the SS Hunyadi (1st Hungarian) and became its commander on 27 November 1944. On 1 December he was reinstated in the Hungarian army with the rank of lieutenant general by the puppet government of Ferenc Szálasi. On 23 February 1945, he was promoted to SS-Gruppenführer and Generalleutnant of the Waffen-SS. Additionally, on 21 March 1945, while retaining command of the 25th Waffen Grenadier Division, he simultaneously was given command of the 26th Waffen Grenadier Division of the SS (2nd Hungarian). He was awarded the Iron Cross, 1st and 2nd class. Under heavy attack from the Red Army, his units were forced to retreat to Austria. Toward the end of the war, Grassy surrendered both Hungarian divisions to the U.S. Army in Timelkam, Austria on 5 May 1945.

== Postwar prosecution and execution ==
Grassy was taken into custody by OSS, he was interned in Nuremberg until November 1945 and then extradited to Hungary. Tried by a Hungarian court, he was found guilty of war crimes in connection with the 1942 massacre and sentenced to death. He was next extradited to Yugoslavia in January 1946. There he was again sentenced to death by hanging for war crimes by the Supreme Tribunal of Vojvodina on 31 October 1946. He was executed on 5 November in Žabalj, together with Ferenc Feketehalmy-Czeydner and Márton Zöldi.

== Sources ==
- Cornelius, Deborah H. (2011). Hungary in World War II: Caught in the Cauldron. New York: Fordham University Press. ISBN 978-0-823-23344-1.
- Miller, Michael D. (2006). Leaders of the SS & German Police. Vol. 1 Reichsführer SS – Gruppenführer (Georg Ahrens to Karl Gutenberger). R. James Bender Publishing. ISBN 978-9-329-70037-2.
- Yerger, Mark C. (1997). Waffen-SS Commanders: The Army, Corps and Divisional Leaders of a Legend. Schiffer Military History. ISBN 978-0-764-30356-2.
