= 25th Waffen Grenadier Division of the SS Hunyadi (1st Hungarian) =

German infantry division

- Insignia of 25th Waffen Grenadier Division of the SS Hunyadi (1st Hungarian)
- Active: November 1944 – May 1945
- Country: Nazi Germany
- Branch: Waffen-SS
- Type: Infantry
- Size: Division
- Nickname: Hunyadi
- Patron: John Hunyadi
- Engagements: World War II

Commanders
- Notable commanders: Thomas Muller; József Grassy

The 25th Waffen Grenadier Division of the SS "Hunyadi" (1st Hungarian) was a short-lived infantry division of the Waffen-SS, an armed branch of the German Nazi Party that served alongside but was never formally part of the Wehrmacht during World War II. Established in November 1944 following the German overthrow of the Hungarian regime of Miklós Horthy, it consisted mainly of troops drawn from the Royal Hungarian Army's 13th Honvéd Division. It was never properly formed, trained, or equipped, and after being evacuated from its training camp in the face of the advancing Soviet Red Army, it surrendered to the United States Army in Austria in May 1945.

== History ==
The division was initially designated 25. SS-Freiwilligen Grenadier Division by the Germans, but was later redesignated 25. Waffen-Grenadier-Division der SS "Hunyadi" (ungarische Nr. 1). The title Hunyadi commemorated the 15th century Hungarian general John Hunyadi. Established in November 1944 following the German overthrow of the Hungarian regime of Miklós Horthy, it consisted of troops drawn from the Royal Hungarian Army's 13th Honvéd Division, as well as a ski battalion. By January 1945, the 20,000 troops available for the formation of the division were concentrated at the German training camp at Neuhammer, but there were few weapons and vehicles to equip the fledgling division, and supplies were also scarce. In February 1945, the Soviet Red Army was closing on the division's training area, so the troops were evacuated, reaching Austria in April. A kampfgruppe left behind as a rearguard at Neuhammer was destroyed. The remainder of the division was involved in its first significant combat on 3 May, fighting elements of the U.S. Third Army. It surrendered to the Americans near the Attersee over the following two days.

== Commanders ==
The division was commanded by two officers:

- SS-Oberführer Thomas Müller (November 1944)
- Waffen-Gruppenführer József Grassy (November 1944 – May 1945)

== Order of Battle (1944–1945) ==
The division consisted of the following principal units:

- 61st Waffen-SS Infantry Regiment
  - 2 Battalions
- 62nd Waffen-SS Infantry Regiment
  - 2 battalions
- 63rd Waffen-SS Infantry Regiment
  - 2 battalions
- 25th Waffen-SS Artillery Regiment
  - 4 battalions
- 25th Waffen-SS Ski Battalion
- 25th Waffen-SS Bicycle Battalion
- 25th Waffen-SS Combat Engineer Battalion
- 25th Waffen-SS Anti-Tank Battalion
- 25th Waffen-SS Anti-Aircraft Battalion
- 25th Waffen-SS Signal Battalion
- 25th Waffen-SS Divisional Interpreter Company
- 25th Waffen-SS Divisional Supply Regiment
- 25th Waffen-SS Training and Replacement Regiment
- 86th Hungarian Replacement and Training Regiment
  - 4 battalions

== Insignia ==
A right hand collar patch bearing the capital letter "H" was manufactured and was worn by some members of the division, but it is likely that many of the troops wore blank collar patches or the standard sig runes. An armshield in the Hungarian national colors was planned, but it is unclear if any were made or worn.

== See also ==
- List of Waffen-SS units
- Table of ranks and insignia of the Waffen-SS
- Waffen-SS foreign volunteers and conscripts
