= 17th Battalion =

The 17th Battalion may refer to:

- 17th Battalion (Australia)
- 2/17th Battalion (Australia)
- 2nd/17th Battalion, Royal New South Wales Regiment
- 17th Armored Engineer Battalion
- 17th (Service) Battalion, Middlesex Regiment, the Football Battalion
- 17th Parachute Battalion (United Kingdom)
- 17th Battalion, Northumberland Fusiliers

== See also ==
- 17th Infantry Battalion (disambiguation)
