= 17th Regiment =

17th Regiment or 17th Infantry Regiment may refer to:

- Royal Leicestershire Regiment, also known as the 17th Leicestershire Regiment of Foot, of the British Army, from 1688 to 1964
- 17th Regiment of Light Dragoons (1759) of the British Army, raised in 1759
- 17th Regiment of Light Dragoons (17th Lancers) of the British Army, redesignated as a lancer regiment in 1861
- 17th Infantry (The Loyal Regiment), Indian Empire, 1858–1922, also known as The Loyal Purbiah Regiment
- 17th Infantry Regiment (Republic of Korea), a unit of the Republic of Korea Army
- 17th Infantry Regiment (United States), a unit of the United States Army
- 17th Cavalry Regiment (United States), a unit of the United States Army
- Combat Logistics Regiment 17, a unit of the United States Marine Corps

American Civil War regiments

- 17th Illinois Volunteer Infantry Regiment
- 17th Regiment Illinois Volunteer Cavalry
- 17th Indiana Infantry Regiment
- 17th Iowa Volunteer Infantry Regiment
- 17th Maine Volunteer Infantry Regiment
- 17th Michigan Volunteer Infantry Regiment
- 17th Wisconsin Volunteer Infantry Regiment

== See also ==
- 17th Division (disambiguation)
- 17th Brigade (disambiguation)
- 17 Squadron (disambiguation)
