= Iain Harvey =

British film producer

- Born: March 1951 (age 75); London
- Citizenship: British
- Education: Sheffield University
- Occupations: Film producer; author
- Known for: A Bear Named Wojtek

Iain Harvey (born 1951) is a British film producer based in London, England. He is mostly known for being the founder of the UK-based animation studio The Illuminated Film Company and for executive producing the BAFTA-awarded short The Snowman (1982), the animated TV show The Very Hungry Caterpillar (1993) and the animated short film T.R.A.N.S.I.T (1998).

== Career ==
in 1972, Harvey obtained a Bachelor's in Economics from the University of Sheffield. After graduating, he worked in publishing with companies such as Hamish Hamilton and the Penguin Group, whilst helping to fund the animation company Snowman Enterprises. Harvey went on to produce and executive produce numerous TV series and animated films, including the feature film When the Wind Blows (1986) and the BBC animated series Spider! (1991).

In 1993, Harvey founded The Illuminated Film Company and produced the animated children's series The Very Hungry Caterpillar & Other Stories (1993), which was released in the United States by Disney. Since then, the studio has produced numerous animated projects, including the animated feature Christmas Carol: The Movie (2001) (dir. by Jimmy T. Murakami) and the TV series Little Princess (2006-2020). Harvey's most recent work includes the TV series The Rubbish World of Dave Spud (2019-2024) and the Oscar-shortlisted animated short A Bear Named Wojtek (2023).

Outside of producing, Harvey has worked as a writer for the online magazine Animation World Network (AWN), contributing numerous articles on the animation industry between 1996 and 2003. Harvey is also on the board of the Mark Bruce Dance Company.

== Filmography ==
=== Film ===
- 1986: When the Wind Blows (feature film) - executive producer. Directed by Jimmy T. Murakami.
- 1993: Prince Cinders (short film) - producer. Directed by Derek W. Hayes.
- 1998: T.R.A.N.S.I.T. (short film) - producer. Directed by Piet Kroon.
- 2001: Christmas Carol: The Movie (feature film) - producer. Directed by Jimmy T. Murakami.
- 2002: War Game (short film) - producer. Directed by Dave Unwin.
- 2023: A Bear Named Wojtek (short film) - producer. Directed by Iain Gardner.

=== Television ===
- 1982: The Snowman (TV special) - executive producer. Directed by Dianne Jackson.
- 1991: Spider! (TV series) - executive producer. Directed by Graham Ralph.
- 1992: Father Christmas (TV short) - executive producer. Directed by Dave Unwin and Dianne Jackson.
- 1993: The World of Eric Carle (also known as The Very Hungry Caterpillar & Other Stories) (TV series) - producer. Directed by Andrew Goff.
- 1998: Oi! Get Off Our Train! (also known as The Animal Train) (TV special) - development executive. Directed by Jimmy T. Murakami.
- 2014: On Angel Wings (TV special) - producer. Directed by Dave Unwin.
- 2006-2020: Little Princess (TV series) - producer. Directed by Edward Foster and Sue Tong.
- 2019-2024: The Rubbish World of Dave Spud (TV series) - producer. Directed by Edward Foster.

== Recognition ==
Harvey's films have received numerous accolades, including the 1982 BAFTA Award for The Snowman (dir. by Dianne Jackson), the 2024 British Animation Award for Best Long Form Animation with A Bear Named Wojtek (2023). In December 2024, the film was also short-listed for the 97th Academy Awards in the Best Animated Short Film category.

The short film War Game (2002), produced by Harvey and directed by Dave Unwin, received the Best Television Special Award at the Annecy International Animation Film Festival.

The TV series Little Princess (2006-2020), produced by Harvey and directed by Edward Foster and Sue Tong, won the 1st prize for Best Animated Series at the 14th Stuttgart International Film Festival and received 3 BAFTA nominations for Best Television Series.

In 2024, the TV Series The Rubbish World of Dave Spud (2019-2024), directed by Edward Foster and produced by Harvey, received the Award for Best Children's Series at the 2024 British Animation Awards.
