= Wallace & Gromit: Vengeance Most Fowl (soundtrack) =

2024 film soundtrack album

Wallace & Gromit: Vengeance Most Fowl (Original Motion Picture Soundtrack)

Film score by Lorne Balfe and Julian Nott
- Released: 13 December 2024
- Recorded: 2024
- Studios: Abbey Road Studios, London; Rottenbiller Studios, Budapest
- Genre: Film score
- Length: 45:06
- Label: Sony Masterworks
- Producers: Lorne Balfe; Jeremy Earnest

Lorne Balfe chronology
Carry-On (2024)	Wallace & Gromit: Vengeance Most Fowl (2024)	We Are Storror (2025)

Julian Nott chronology
On Angel Wings (2014)	Wallace & Gromit: Vengeance Most Fowl (2024)

Wallace & Gromit: Vengeance Most Fowl (Original Motion Picture Soundtrack) is the soundtrack album composed by Lorne Balfe and Wallace & Gromit series composer Julian Nott for the film of the same name and released by Sony Masterworks on 13 December 2024.

== Development ==
In August 2024, it was announced that Lorne Balfe and series composer Julian Nott would compose music for Wallace & Gromit: Vengeance Most Fowl, the former of whom wrote additional music for The Curse of the Were-Rabbit. Nott provided the themes while Balfe had expanded them and also created new soundscapes and thematic materials tying to the earlier franchise themes. Themes for recurring characters were also utilized, including Wallace's and Feathers McGraw's theme. A new theme, referred to as the 'gnome theme', was composed for one of the main characters. It was written in a style consistent with the film's world, incorporating a fast-paced, Hollywood-influenced sound. Balfe considered Nott's musical style as incorporating "film noir, quintessential British sound and classical" elements into the score. An ensemble 70-piece orchestra from the Budapest Scoring Orchestra recorded it live under the supervision of the musicians, the music team and the film crew, which Balfe and Nott consider it to be the exciting experience on working on the film.

== Release ==
The soundtrack to Vengeance Most Fowl was released on 13 December 2024 through Sony Masterworks label.

== Reception ==
Lovia Gyarkye of The Hollywood Reporter wrote "A haywire adventure, heightened by Lorne Balfe and Julian Nott's suspenseful score, ensues, in which the police investigate Wallace while Gromit tries to prove his innocence." Steve Henderson of Skwigly wrote "Music plays a massive role here, exciting, thrilling and delivering pangs of nostalgia throughout the film. The nostalgic rhythms are used throughout and make direct references to past films. Heroic tones when the bike from A Close Shave is unveiled, a familiar dramatic sting when Feathers confronts Wallace. If any criticism can be levelled at this film it's that it treads old ground."

Pete Hammond of Deadline Hollywood wrote "Lorne Balfe's and Julian Nott's sprightly musical score adds to the fun for Wallace & Gromit devotees everywhere." Elijah Isaiah Johnson of POC Culture wrote "It's refreshing to hear a soundtrack that is not only chock full of movement but has a unique sound palette to it as well. Individuality among musical scores feels like a dying art in a world when the landscape is dominated by cues that recall temp tracks of previously successful scores, things start to sound a bit too homogenized. Animation is one of the last areas where it feels like composers are allowed to be free to roam wherever their imagination, and the script, takes them. And Lorne Balfe seizes the opportunity; alongside Julian Nott's continuously outstanding themes, the soundtrack is one that could live on its own, film or not."

== Track listing ==
No.	Title	Length
1.	"Wallace & Gromit: Vengeance Most Fowl"	3:11
2.	"Good Morning Gromit"	1:59
3.	"Guilty as Charged"	1:57
4.	"Neat and Tidy"	1:39
5.	"Gnome Improvements"	2:01
6.	"Norbot Recharge Time" (Jeremy Earnest)	2:40
7.	"Reprogrammed for Revenge"	2:41
8.	"March of the Norbots"	1:34
9.	"The Gnome Song"	1:42
10.	"Up to Gnome Good"	1:24
11.	"The Wallaby Street Mob"	2:34
12.	"The Zoo"	2:56
13.	"Rush to the Museum"	2:04
14.	"The Blue Diamond"	2:11
15.	"Leaf it to Me"	1:45
16.	"The Fast and The Furnished"	1:50
17.	"A Crazed Inventor"	2:55
18.	"Nun in a Tunnel"	2:00
19.	"Plant Pot Pummeling"	1:43
20.	"Turnip for the Books"	2:30
21.	"Wallace & Gromit Theme"	0:33
22.	"8 Bit Cheese"	1:17
Total length:		45:06

== Personnel ==
Credits adapted from liner notes:

- Music composers: Lorne Balfe, Julian Nott
- Original themes: Julian Nott
- Score producer: Lorne Balfe, Jeremy Earnest
- Score production managers: Ashleigh Kelly, Alice Bird
- Musical assistance: Venice Ohleyer
- Additional music: Jeremy Earnest
- Additional arrangements: Brandon Campbell, Stuart Michael Thomas, Ethan Gillespie, Yaron Eigenstein
- Music editor: Tony Lewis
- Orchestrators: Adam Price, Nicolò Braghiroli, Jack McKenzie
- Technical assistance: Ethan Gillespie
- Orchestra contractor: Gareth Griffiths, Chamber Orchestra of London
- Conductor: James Brett, London & Péter Illényi, Budapest
- Copyist: Jill Streater, London
- Librarian: Katalin Katalin Réti, Budapest & Agnes Sapszon, Budapest
- Music preparation: Ananada Chaterjee
- Recording engineers: Simon Rhodes, Viktor Szabo
- Orchestras: Chamber Orchestra of London, Budapest Scoring Orchestra
- Choir: LYC Voices
- Choir coordinator: Lucy van Straubenzee
- Choir contractor and Choirmaster: Ben Parry
- Choir conductor: Rachel Staunton
- Recording studio: Abbey Road Studios, London & Rottenbiller Studios, Budapest
- Mixing engineer: Simon Rhodes
- Pro-tools operator: Christopher Parker, Patrik Veréb, Budapest
- Orchestra coordinator: Bertalan Veér
- Session producer: Bálint Sapszon, Budapest

== Chart performance ==
Chart (2024)	Peak position
UK Soundtrack Albums (OCC)	49

== Accolades ==
Award	Date of ceremony	Category	Recipient(s)	Result	Ref.
Hollywood Music in Media Awards	20 November 2024	Best Original Score – Animated Film	Lorne Balfe and Julian Nott	Nominated	
Annie Awards	8 February 2025	Outstanding Achievement for Music in an Animated Feature Production	Lorne Balfe and Julian Nott	Nominated	
