= Illuminated Film Company =

UK studio of animated films

The Illuminated Film Company
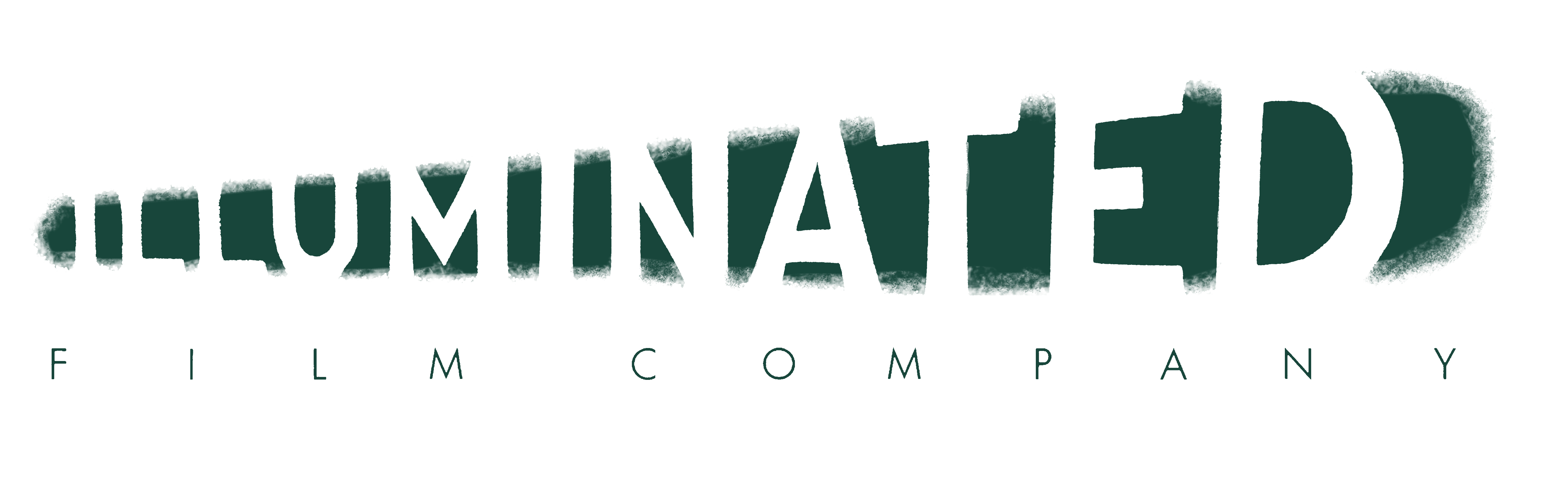
- Type: Production company
- Industry: Entertainment
- Founded: 1993; 33 years ago
- Founders: Iain Harvey
- Headquarters: Hammersmith, London, England
- Website: www.illuminatedfilms.com

The Illuminated Film Company is a British animation company founded in 1993 by Iain Harvey. It has produced the series Little Princess (2006-2020) and the ITV children's surreal comedy series The Rubbish World of Dave Spud (2019–2024) and other 2D-animated productions such as The Very Hungry Caterpillar & Other Stories, A Bear Named Wojtek, War Game and On Angel Wings.

== History ==
Early in 1993, Iain Harvey formed The Illuminated Film Company, now located in Hammersmith, London.

Under Illuminated, he produced The Very Hungry Caterpillar & Other Stories, based on Eric Carle's books. This programme was released in America on the Disney video label.

Illuminated has completed four series, as well as two 22 minutes specials, of the four times BAFTA nominated animated pre-school series Little Princess (135 x 11 mins and 2 x 22 mins). It was first broadcast in the UK in October 2006 by Channel 5 on its Milkshake platform. Little Princess has now been sold and broadcast to over 140 territories around the world. The show won a Cairo Golden Award for Best TV Film, the first prize for Best TV film in The Fifth Tehran International Festival and first prize in the Best Animated Series category at The 14th Stuttgart International Festival. It has also received four BAFTA nominations.

In 2014, Illuminated Films completed production on a 30-minute animated special – On Angel Wings which is based upon a picture-book by world-renowned author Michael Morpurgo.

In 2019, Illuminated produced a commercial for the designer brand Barbour featuring the character Father Christmas by Raymond Briggs for their Christmas campaign. Following its success, Illuminated Films produced a second commercial for Barbour in 2020 for their Christmas campaign featuring Father Christmas.

By way of contrast, Illuminated has completed production of a new surreal comedy series The Rubbish World of Dave Spud commissioned by ITV for broadcast in the UK and sold to ABC (Australia), SVT (Sweden) and Beta Films for international distribution. Following successful ratings from the first series, ITV have commissioned a second series of 52 episodes that is currently airing on CITV.

== Future ==
In 2020, Illuminated Films was awarded funding from the BFI Young Audience Content Fund for a half-hour special called A Bear Named Wojtek. It is based on a true story about an orphaned bear named Wojtek in WWII that is enlisted into the Polish army and travels to Scotland before ending up at Edinburgh Zoo. It is currently in production and due to be released in 2024.

The film was shortlisted for the 97th Academy Awards for Best Short Animation. It was also nominated for Best Special Production at the Annie Awards.

== List of productions ==
Illuminated Films Company has produced a number of animated features, shorts, and TV series, as well as adverts.

- The Very Hungry Caterpillar & Other Stories (1993 (UK)/1994 (Australia)/1995 (US))
- T.R.A.N.S.I.T. (1998)
- Christmas Carol: The Movie (2001)
- War Game (2002)
- Little Princess (TV series) (2006-2011, 2019)
- On Angel Wings (2014)
- The Rubbish World of Dave Spud (2019–2024)
- A Bear Named Wojtek (2023)

== Adverts ==
- Barbour Christmas (2012)
- Barbour Christmas (2019)
- Barbour Christmas (2020)

== Awards and nominations ==
Year	Award	Category	Production	Result
2024	Broadcast Awards	Best Children's Programme	The Rubbish World of Dave Spud	Nominated
2022	RTS Programme Awards	Children's Programme	The Rubbish World of Dave Spud	Won
2022	British Animation Awards	Writers Award	The Rubbish World of Dave Spud Twinfestation – Madeleine Brettingham	Nominated
2022	British Animation Awards	Best Use of Sound	The Rubbish World of Dave Spud Burning Wheels - shared with Fonic	Nominated
2022	Broadcast Awards	Best Children's Programme	The Rubbish World of Dave Spud	Nominated
2021	Broadcast Awards	Best Children's Programme	The Rubbish World of Dave Spud	Nominated
2020	British Animation Awards	Best Voice Performance	The Cast - The Rubbish World of Dave Spud	Nominated
2020	British Animation Awards	Best Children's Series award	The Rubbish World of Dave Spud	Nominated
2008	BAFTA	Best Pre-School Series	Little Princess (TV series)	Nominated
2007	BAFTA	Best Pre-School Series	Little Princess (TV series)	Nominated
2002	British Animation Awards	Children's Choice Award	War Game	Won
1998	LAFCA Award	Best Animation	T.R.A.N.S.I.T	Won
