= Ian Harvey (disambiguation) =

Ian Harvey is an Australian cricketer.

Ian Harvey or Ian Harvie may also refer to:

- Ian Harvey (politician) (1914–1987), British businessman and politician
- Ian Harvey (rugby union) (1903–1966), New Zealand rugby union player
- Ian Harvie, American comedian
- Iain Harvie, musician
- Iain Harvey, film producer
