= A Bear Named Wojtek =

- Directed by: Iain Gardner
- Written by: Wojciech Lepianka
- Produced by: Iain Harvey; Wlodzimierz Matuszewski
- Starring: Bill Paterson; Shauna MacDonald; James Sutherland; Richard Gadd; Michael Golab; Piotr Baumann; Tomek Borkowy; Remi Rachuba
- Edited by: Rachel Roberts; Will Winfield
- Music by: Normand Roger
- Production companies: Illuminated Film Company; Filmograf; Wojtek Animation; Animation Garden; Running Rabbit Films
- Release dates: 10 August 2023 (Flickers Rhode Island International Film Festival, United States)
- Running time: 28 minutes
- Countries: United Kingdom; Poland
- Language: English

A Bear Named Wojtek is a 2023 Scottish-Polish animated short film directed by Iain Gardner. The 28-minute animated film about the true story of Wojtek, the war bear, has been selected in various international film festivals, including the Annecy International Animation Film Festival and the Manchester Animation Film Festival. It also won a British Animation Award for Best Long Form Animation as well as a Venice TV Award for Best Animation. The film was first broadcast on BBC Alba on the 8th May 2024. It was shortlisted for the Best Animated Short Film category at the 97th Academy Awards.

== Plot ==
A Bear Named Wojtek brings to life the extraordinary true story of a Syrian brown bear adopted by Polish soldiers during World War II. This half-hour animated short follows Wojtek from the Persian Desert to the Battle of Monte Cassino, where he becomes both a soldier and a symbol of resilience. As the soldiers forge an unbreakable bond with Wojtek, the film explores themes of friendship, identity, and the search for belonging in times of upheaval.

== Awards ==
Year	Festivals	Award/Category	Status
2023	Flickers Rhode Island International Film Festival	Best Animated Short	Nominated
2023	Manchester Animation Film Festival	British Animated Short Film Award	Nominated
2024	Annecy International Animation Film Festival	Competition - Best Television Film	Nominated
2024	Venice TV Awards	Best Animation	Won
2024	Animasyros	TV & Commissioned Films Competition Section	Nominated
2024	British Animation Award	Best Long Form Animation	Won
2024	Portland Festival of Cinema Animation & Technology	Best Score in a Short Animation	Won
2024	Spokane International Film Festival	Audience Award for Best Animated Short	Won
2024	Animayo International Film Festival of Animation	International Film	Nominated
