= War Game (2002 film) =

2002 British film

- Directed by: Dave Unwin
- Written by: Michael Foreman (book), Simon Nicholson (screenplay)
- Produced by: Iain Harvey
- Starring: Iain Jones; Adam Godley; Ben Warwick; Colin McFarlane; Kate Winslet
- Edited by: Taylor Grant
- Music by: Julian Nott
- Production company: Illuminated Film Company
- Distributed by: Pathé Distribution
- Release date: 11 February 2002
- Running time: 29 minutes
- Country: United Kingdom

War Game is a 2002 animated short film made by the British animation company Illuminated Films, and based on the Michael Foreman novel of the same name. The film included many of the same scenes listed in the book, although four new characters were created. It features the voices of Iain Jones, Adam Godley, Ben Warwick, Colin McFarlane and Kate Winslet.

== Plot ==
In the late summer of 1914, three teenage boys in Suffolk—Will, Freddie, and Lacey—are out playing a game of football when they discover their opponents intend to enlist the British Army in light of the outbreak of the First World War. On their way home, a singing Kitchener springs from his poster to tell the cousins that they should "play the game" (go to war). The young men have initial doubts about becoming soldiers but are persuaded to enlist at a recruitment event. That evening, Will and Lacey inform their family of their enlistment. Though their father wishes them well, their sister Annie cries, and their mother (Kate Winslet) warns her sons that war is not a game, and that they will be killed.

The boys leave for France regardless, where they quickly encounter hardships of the trenches, witnessing artillery barrages, dogfights, and dying soldiers. After complaining about the quality of the bully beef issued in their field rations, the boys kick the beef can through the air like a football, drawing the fire of a sniper in the Imperial German Army, whose precise marksmanship they test using a meal plate. As the seasons change to winter, the boys hear German soldiers in the opposing trenches singing Christmas carols.

On Christmas Day, a German soldier steps out onto no man's land and, after planting a Christmas tree, invites the English soldiers out with them. All of the soldiers peacefully step out to play football, exchange pleasantries, and conduct shared funerals for their dead. The soldiers also learn that they have much in common, evidenced by a German soldier revealing he was once a barber in London. However, the truce is broken up by each side's commanding officers, and the soldiers are forced to return to their trenches. The Germans suggest another truce, but the British are ordered by headquarters to never conduct another truce again, which they reluctantly obey. Instead, headquarters sends them official gifts, such as playing cards and treats; Will receives a Christmas card containing a photo of King George V, which mockingly sings to him about dying for his country before being blown away in the wind.

Time passes to 1916, during the Battle of the Somme. The boys, who are waiting to be relieved, are now so dirtied by the war that they can barely recognize each other. They learn the German soldiers from the truce have been replaced by unfriendly soldiers who do not want to conduct another truce. Their commanding officer wearily prepares a charge, which is signaled by the football from the truce being kicked across no man's land. The soldiers emerge from the trenches but are rapidly cut down by artillery and machine gun fire. Lacey and Freddie are killed, while Will is mortally wounded, and lies in a shell crater with a German soldier. They exchange photos from their home countries before both men die of their wounds.

== Voice cast ==
- Iain Jones as William "Will" James Foreman
- Adam Godley as Lacey Christmas Goddard and Dad
- Ben Warwick as Frederick "Freddie" Benjamin Foreman
- Tom Wesel as German Soldier
- Colin McFarlane as Little General and King George V
- Phil Rowson as Machine Gunner
- Kate Winslet as Mum and Annie

== Dedication ==
The DVD cover has the dedication: "In memory of my uncles who died in the Great War. William James Forman, killed aged 18, Frederick Benjamin Foreman, killed aged 20, William Henry Goddard, killed aged 20, Lacey Christmas Goddard, died of wounds Christmas Day 1918, aged 24."

== Awards ==
The film has won numerous awards including the Children's Choice Award at the British Animation Awards, Best Television Special at the Annecy International Animated Film Festival, the International Student Jury Award at the Banff International Television Festival, Best Production of the Year at the Cartoons on the Bay Festival in Italy and 1st prize at the Cinemagic Festival in Belfast.
