= Venice TV Awards =

Italian television awards

The Venice TV Award is a television prize bestowed each year in September.

== Description ==
Two weeks after the Venice International Film Festival, a team of jurors from around the world meet in Venice to select the winners of 19 categories for the Venice TV Award. The main prerequisite for a nomination is that the production was first broadcast on a television station, apart from the New Talent category. This award brings national and international recognition for quality content.

== Award categories ==
Category
Best Of Technical High Quality
Best TV Series
Best TV Film
Documentary
Light Entertainment
News
Program Promotion
Branded Entertainment
Sport
Children / Youth
Comedy
Performing Arts
Reality-TV
Telenovela
Cross Platform Programming
New Talent (Directors)
Animation
Cinematography
Direction

== Overview of wins ==
At the 2026 Venice TV Awards, Gold Trophies were awarded in 19 categories. Productions broadcast by the BBC won in four categories: Comedy for Dinosaur (season 2), Children/Youth for The Scarecrows' Wedding, Technology and Innovation for Parenthood, and Direction for Waiting for the Out. The Series award was presented to the Brazilian HBO Max production Oxygen Masks Will Not Drop Down Automatically. Other Gold winners included France Télévisions' Paris Attacks: Our Lives Shattered in the Documentary category, NHK's The Man Who Carried the Voices of August in the Television Film category, CBS Evening News in News Coverage, and ORF III's Opportunity Makes a Thief in Performing Arts. In Animation, Australia's ABC won the Gold Trophy for Tales From Outer Suburbia. The New Talent Award was presented to Cloud 99, a production of the National Film and Television School in the United Kingdom. Gold-winning productions represented eleven countries, while, according to the organisers, productions from 25 countries were honoured across the awards.

At the 2025 Venice TV Awards, BBC productions won three Gold Medals, with victories in Documentary for The Man Who Definitely Didn't Steal Hollywood, in Children/Youth for Crongton, in Comedy for Ludwig, and a Special Jury Prize for Atomic People. NHK secured three Golds, winning in Animation for Luka and the Flower of the Sun, in Best TV-Film for Driving into the Storm, and in Cinematography for Deep Ocean: Kingdom of the Coelacanth. South Korea celebrated its first ever Gold at the Venice TV Awards when Mnet’s Couple Palace won in Light Entertainment. Other international winners included broadcasters from Canada, France, the United States, Finland, Brazil, Portugal, the Netherlands and Germany.

At the 2024 Venice TV Awards, the BBC won three Gold Medals, securing victories in Light Entertainment for The Eurovision Song Contest 2023, in Animation for A Bear Named Wojtek, and in Cinematography for Ukraine: Enemy in the Woods. The UK, with a total of seven wins, was the most successful country. Sky UK, ITV, Apple TV+ and Channel 4 also received awards. Other international winners included broadcasters from France, Germany, Brazil, the United States, Spain, and Portugal. A total of 44 countries participated in the awards.

2023 was the work of the BBC that most regularly captured the attention of the judges, securing a total of three Gold Medals. Apple TV+ and Disney+ triumphed with two Gold Medals. NHK, Japan earned two Gold Medals as well. Elsewhere, one Gold Medal went to each of the following broadcasters: CBS, HBO, TV Globo Brazil, Mediacorp, Singapore, Telewizja Polska, Viacom18, India, Televisão Independente, Portugal, and YLE, Finland and in Talent to Civica Scuola di Cinema Luchino Visconti.

In 2022 Sky Atlantic’s Landscapers (TV series), a four-part starring Olivia Colman and David Thewlis, was handed the award for Best TV Series. Life & Rhymes won in Light Entertainment, "Romeo & Juliet", from the Royal National Theatre in the Performing Art category and in the Children/Youth "COP26: In Your Hands", a documentary giving a voice to a diverse group of young people, allowing them to air their concerns over climate change. Other UK winners on the night included Channel 4, which was rewarded in Best TV Film for Help (2021 television film) and ITV News in the News category for its coverage of the storming of the US Capitol building. In the Comedy category was Minx (TV series), HBO Max the winner.

In 2021, works from the United Kingdom were the most successful, winning five Golden Trophies. It's a Sin (TV series) (Channel 4), Creator: Russell T Davies was successful in TV Series. Channel 4 was also successful in Documentary with "The School That Tried To End Racism". BBC Production "Anthony" won in Best TV Film while Sky took two wins, one in Comedy Two Weeks to Live (TV series) and a second in Light Entertainment with "Rob & Romesh Vs.". Globo Brazil won three Gold Trophies (Telenovela, Cross Platform, Branded Entertainment). Productions from United States won two Gold Trophies, Australia, Portugal, and Austria, one each. Nominees and winners were rewarded from 29 countries: United Kingdom, Germany, USA, Brazil, India, France, Japan, Sweden, Italy, Canada, Czech Republic, Denmark, Estonia, Finland, Iceland, Spain, Austria, Australia, Belgium, The Netherlands, South Africa, Turkey, Philippines, Poland, Portugal, Qatar, Russia, Israel and Singapore.

2020 "The New Pope" (Sky Italy) with Jude Law and John Malkovich was successful in TV series. United Kingdom were most successful, collecting 4 Gold Trophies: Sky "Breeders" in Comedy Category, ITV "Digital Gulag" in Documentary category, BBC in Children/Youth with "The Snail and the Whale" and Endemol struck gold in the Light Entertainment Section with "Master Chef Australia". Productions from United States and Brazil won two Gold Trophies each. Nominees and Winner were rewarded from United Kingdom, France, United States, Brazil, Germany, Italy, India, Singapore, Sweden, Czech Republic, Australia, Spain, Israel, Hong Kong, Qatar, Belgium, Finland, Russia, Austria, Canada, Chile, Hungary, Japan, Poland, Portugal, South Africa, South Korea, Switzerland, Turkey.

2019 Nominees from the United Kingdom were most successful, collecting 4 Gold Trophies: Sky won with "Chernobyl" (co-produced by HBO) and with "Art of Drumming" in the Performing Arts category. BBC took the Comedy award with "Don’t Forget the Driver" and also struck gold in the Youth section with "My Life I Will Survive". Rewards went as well to France, Brazil, Germany, India, USA, Singapore, Sweden, Italy, Ireland, Czech Republic, Australia, Spain, Israel, Hong Kong, Qatar, Malaysia, Lithuania, New Zealand, Croatia, Taiwan, Norway, Belgium, Finland, The Netherlands and Russia.

2018 the leading countries were United Kingdom and Germany, each with 2 Gold Trophies. United Kingdom won in Documentary with Mosul (Channel4/Mongoose Production) and Light Entertainment - Cruising with Jane McDonald (Channel 5). German Winners were 4Blocks in TV Series (TNT Series) and Generation 44 in Best TV Movie Generation 44 (ARD) produced by Zieglerfilm.

== Supporting associations ==
- ACT (Association of Commercial Television in Europe) – The Association of Commercial Television in Europe represents the interests of leading commercial broadcasters in 37 European countries. ACT member companies finance, produce, promote and distribute content and services across different platforms.
- egta (European Group of Television Advertising) – egta is the international trade body of multiplatform TV and audio businesses. It represents more than 180 members in over 40 markets. Based in Brussels, egta represents the interests of its members at European institutions and provides services including lobbying and European affairs, knowledge exchange and benchmarking, events and networking.
- IMZ (International Music + Media Centre) – The IMZ International Music + Media Centre is a Vienna-based nonprofit organisation founded under the aegis of UNESCO in 1961 to preserve the performing arts as a cultural asset. Its mission is to promote the performing arts in and through audiovisual media. The IMZ also acts as an Ambassador for the Creative Europe programme and promotes European and transnational cultural exchange.

== Gold Winners 2026 Venice TV Award ==
Category	Title	Broadcaster	Production	Country
Series	Oxygen Masks Will Not Drop Down Automatically	HBO Max	Warner Bros. Discovery and Morena Filmes	Brazil
Documentary	Paris Attacks: Our Lives Shattered	France Télévisions	INA	France
Television Film	The Man Who Carried the Voices of August	NHK	NHK (Japan Broadcasting Corporation), WOWOW	Japan
News Coverage	CBS Evening News: February 14, 2025	CBS	CBS NEWS	United States
Performing Arts	Opportunity makes a Thief	ORF III	ORF	Austria
Comedy	Dinosaur Season 2	BBC Scotland / BBC Three / Hulu	Two Brothers Pictures	United Kingdom
Children / Youth	The Scarecrows' Wedding	BBC	Magic Light Pictures	United Kingdom
Light Entertainment	Zero Stars	TLC / HBO Max	CPL Productions	United Kingdom
Reality TV	Love Is Blind: UK	Netflix	CPL Productions	United Kingdom
Soap/Telenovela	Vitória	SIC / OPTO / Disney+	SP Television	Portugal
Sport	King Of Lies: Football’s Trillion Dollar Con	Sky UK	Dash Pictures / SKY / Matthew Lorenzo Productions / Intermission Film	United Kingdom
Titles, Branding & Promotion	Rohit Sharma sets the mission: Repeat History. Defeat History	Star Sports & Jio Hotstar	First December Films	India
Technology and Innovation	Parenthood	BBC One	Silverback Films	United Kingdom
Branded Entertainment	SynergyTech & Day One	Prime Video / 3Cat	Zebra Productions	Spain
Cross Platform	Take Off The Science Challenge Show	RTL	FreeLens Télévision / André Losch Fondation / Fonds National de la Recherche	Luxembourg
Animation	Tales From Outer Suburbia	ABC	Highly Spirited, Flying Bark Productions	Australia
Direction	Waiting for the Out	BBC One and BBC iPlayer	Sister Pictures	United Kingdom
Cinematography	Ocean with David Attenborough	National Geographic	Silverback Films & Open Planet Studios Production	United Kingdom
New Talent	Cloud 99	–	National Film and Television School	United Kingdom

== Gold Winners 2025 Venice TV Award ==
Category	Title	Broadcaster	Production	Country
Best Series	Empathie	Crave	Trio Orange	Canada
Best TV-Film	Driving into the Storm	NHK	NHK and Temjin in association with NHK Enterprises	Japan
Documentary	The Man Who Definitely Didn't Steal Hollywood	BBC	Wonderhood Studios	United Kingdom
Special Jury Prize	Atomic People	BBC	Minnow Films	United Kingdom
Comedy	Ludwig	BBC One	Big Talk Studios in association with That Mitchell & Webb Company	United Kingdom
Best Technical Quality	8 May 1945	TF1	TF1	France
Performing Arts	The Lost Music of Auschwitz	Sky Arts	Windfall Films	United Kingdom
Light Entertainment	Couple Palace	Mnet	CJ ENM (Mnet)	South Korea
Children/Youth	Crongton	BBC	New Pictures	United Kingdom
Reality-TV	Farmers Going Abroad	SBS6	BlazHoffski Productions	Netherlands
Cross-Platform	Peacock 2024 Paris Olympic Games	Peacock	NBCUniversal	United States
Branded Entertainment	RONA's Build it to Win it	Bell Media / Noovo	Zone3	Canada
News	The CBS Evening News with Norah O’Donnell: Reporting From the Red Sea	CBS News	CBS News	United States
Sport	Giroud	Canal+	Les Bons Clients / Federation Studio France	France
Program Promotion	We Rise as We Fight	TV Globo	Promo TV Globo	Brazil
Telenovela	The Last Will	SIC	SP Television	Portugal
New Talent	If I could fly	–	Filmakademie Baden-Württemberg GmbH	Germany
Animation	Luka and the Flower of the Sun	NHK	NHK, TMC, NHK Enterprises	Japan
Cinematography	Deep Ocean: Kingdom of the Coelacanth	NHK	NHK, ZDF, ARTE and OceanX in association with NHK Enterprises	Japan
Direction	Queen of Fucking Everything (dir. Tiina Lymi)	Yle	Rabbit Films	Finland

== Gold Winners 2024 Venice TV Award ==
Category	Title	Broadcaster	Production	Country
Best Series	Mr Bates vs The Post Office	ITV1	ITV Studios and Little Gem	United Kingdom
Best TV-Film	On the Run	TF1	Radar Films	France
Documentary	Hatton	Sky UK	Noah Media Group	United Kingdom
Comedy	Extraordinary (TV series)	Disney+	Sid Gentle Films	United Kingdom
Best Technical Quality	The Great Kanto Earthquake	NHK	NHK	Japan
Performing Arts	Theodora	3sat	Naxos	Austria
Light Entertainment	Eurovision Song Contest 2023	BBC One	BBC Studios	United Kingdom
Children/Youth	Lovely Little Farm (Season 2)	Apple TV+	Darrall Macqueen	United Kingdom
Reality-TV	Tempting Fortune	Channel 4	Voltage TV	United Kingdom
Cross-Platform	How Sexism Shaped our Teenage Years	RTVE	RTVE	Spain
Branded Entertainment	Big Brother Modo Stone	TV Globo	TV Globo	Brazil
News	The CBS Evening News with Norah O’Donnell	CBS	CBS News	United States
Sport	Ayrton Senna, O Dia que Ainda Não Terminou	Record	Câmera Record	Brazil
Program Promotion	Olympics – All the shine	TV Globo	Hodc, Promo TV Globo	Brazil
Telenovela	Lady of Tides	Sociedade Independente de Comunicação	SP Television	Portugal
New Talent	Vision d’été	Civica Scuola di Cinema Luchino Visconti	Civica Scuola di Cinema Luchino Visconti	Italy
Animation	A Bear Named Wojtek	BBC Alba	Illuminated Film Company	United Kingdom
Cinematography	Ukraine: Enemy in the Woods	BBC Two	Hoyo Films	United Kingdom
Direction	Loki season 2	Disney+	Marvel Studios	United States
Special Jury Prize	The Zweiflers	ARD	Turbokultur	Germany

== Gold Winners 2023 Venice TV Award ==
Category	Title	Broadcaster	Production	Country
Best Series	Oussekine	Disney+	Itinéraire Productions (UGC Group) for Disney+	France
Best TV-Film	Life and Death in the Warehouse	BBC Three, BBC One Wales	BBC Studios	United Kingdom
Documentary	Mariupol: The People’s Story	BBC	Top Hat Productions and Hayloft Productions	United Kingdom
Comedy	Shrinking (TV series)	Apple TV+	Apple Original, Warner Bros. International Television Production	United States
Best Technical Quality	Nature’s Hidden Miracles	NHK	NHK	Japan
Performing Arts	New Year’s Concert of the Vienna Philharmonic 2023	ORF (broadcaster)	ORF (broadcaster)	Austria
Light Entertainment	Song of my life	YLE	Yellow Film & TV	Finland
Children/Youth	Jane (American TV series)	Apple TV+	Sinking Ship	United States
Reality-TV	The Traitors (British TV series)	BBC One	Studio Lambert	United Kingdom
Cross-Platform	GLOW x HBO Industry S2	HBO, BBC	Bad Wolf	United Kingdom
Branded Entertainment	Happy Hour with Mariana Ximenes	TV Globo	A+ D+	Brazil
News	The CBS Evening News with Norah O’Donnell: Roe v Wade	CBS	CBS	United States
Sport	The Moment: How Sports Changed The World	NHK	Red Bull Studios and 1895 Films	United States
Program Promotion	Nickelodeon Sand Art Ident	Nickelodeon (Indian TV channel)	Viacom18	India
Telenovela	Para Sempre	Televisão Independente	Plural Entertainment	Portugal
New Talent	The Ocean around Milan	Civica Scuola di Cinema Luchino Visconti	Bianca Burini	Italy
Animation	Star Wars: Visions – I Am Your Mother	Disney+	Lucasfilm, Aardman Animations	United Kingdom
Cinematography	Filip (film)	Telewizja Polska	Telewizja Polska	Poland
Direction	Inside Crime Scene	August Pictures	Mediacorp	Singapore

== Gold Winners 2022 Venice TV Award ==
Category	Title	Broadcaster	Production	Country
Best Series	Landscapers (TV series)	Sky Atlantic	SISTER in association with South of the River Pictures	United Kingdom
Beste TV-Film	Help (2021 television film)	Channel 4	The Forge Entertainment, One Shoe Films	United Kingdom
Documentary	Arsène Wenger: Invicible	Canal+	Federation Entertainment, Noah Media Group, Yvette Production	France
Comedy	Minx (TV series)	HBO Max	Lionsgate Television, Feigco Entertainment	United States
Best Technical Quality	Inaccessible Cities	Al Jazeera	AJ Contrast, Al Jazeera Digital	Qatar
Performing Arts	Romeo & Juliet	Sky Arts	National Theatre in association with Sabel Productions/Cuba Pictures	United Kingdom
Light Entertainment	Life & Rhymes	Sky Arts	CPL Productions	United Kingdom
Children/Youth	COP26: In Your Hands	Sky Kids	Fresh Start Media Productions	United Kingdom
Reality-TV	Love on the Spectrum	Netflix	Northern Pictures Pty Ltd	United States
Cross-Platform	Clara Henry – The revenge	Sveriges Television AB/SVTPlay	Sveriges Television AB	Sweden
Branded Entertainment	Lego Masters (American TV series)	Fox Broadcasting Company	Endemol Shine North America and Tuesday’s Child	United States
News	ITV NEWS: The Storming of the Capitol	ITV	ITN/ITV News	United Kingdom
Sport	Kiyou’s Kata	Kansai Telecasting Corporation	Kansai Telecasting Corporation	Japan
Program Promotion	ONAIR GLOOB	GLOOB	TV Globo	Brazil
New Talent	In Harmony	University for the Creative Arts	Markus Øvre	United Kingdom

== Gold Winners 2021 Venice TV Award ==
Category	Title	Broadcaster	Production	Country
Best Series	It's a Sin (TV series)	Channel 4	HBO Max presents a Red Production Company production in association with All3Media International for Channel 4 Television	United Kingdom
Beste TV-Film	Anthony	BBC1	LA Productions	United Kingdom
Documentary	The School That Tried To End Racism	Channel 4	Proper Content	United Kingdom
Comedy	Two Weeks to Live (TV series)	Sky One	Avalon Television	United Kingdom
Best Technical Quality	Star Wars – About Cinema	Al Jazeera Arabic Channel	Al Jazeera Media Network	Qatar
Performing Arts	Cosiì fan tutte (Salzburg Festival)	ORF (broadcaster)	ORF, ZDF/Arte and UNITEL	Austria
Light Entertainment	Rob & Romesh Vs.	Sky One	CPL Productions	UK
Children/Youth	Goldie’s Oldies	Nickelodeon	MViacomCBS International Studios (VIS) UK	United States
Reality-TV	Love on the Spectrum	ABC TV (Australian TV channel)	Northern Pictures	Australia
Cross-Platform	OFF Makers	Canal OFF	Canal OFF	Brazil
Branded Entertainment	The Reality Show I Live In (O Reality Que Eu Vivo)	Multishow	Multishow / Delírio Produções	Brazil
News	The Diagnosis: COVID-19	Televisão Independente	TVI	Portugal
Sport	Highest Air	Olympic Channel	IMG, Olympic Channel	Spain
Program Promotion	Ting Tong Show Title Sequence	Nick India	Viacom18	India
New Talent	Memories of a Sounded Past	Not aired yet	UNO	United States

== Gold Winners 2020 Venice TV Award ==
Category	Title	Broadcaster	Production	Country
Best Series	The New Pope	Sky Italia, Sky Atlantic, HBO	Canal+, The Apartment – Wildside with Haut et Court TV and The Mediapro Studio	Italy
Best TV-Film	Broken Man	France TV	STORIA TV	France
Documentary	Undercover: Inside China’s Digital Gulag	ITV (TV channel)	Hardcash Productions	United Kingdom
Comedy	Breeders	Sky One	Avalon Television	United Kingdom
Best Technical Quality	Giuseppe Verdi: Rigoletto	ORF	Unitel, Germany	Austria
Performing Arts	Concerto Budapest & Kremerata Baltica Concert film for Mezzo TV	Mezzo TV	Concerto Budapest, clockWISE Productions	France
Light Entertainment	MasterChef Australia	Network Ten Australia	Endemol Shine Australia	Australia
Children/Youth	The Snail and the Whale	BBC One	Magic Light Pictures	United Kingdom
Reality-TV	Survival Days	Canal OFF	Canal OFF / Deep Blue Films	Brazil
Cross-Platform	101 East – The $5 Forests	Al Jazeera English	Al Jazeera English	Qatar
Branded Entertainment	Summer Chillin‘	Canal OFF	Canal OFF / Faissol Filmes	Brazil
News	Hong Kong Connection: Covid 19 mini series (Cities in Lockdown and The story of face masks)	RTHK	Radio Television Hong Kong	Hong Kong
Sport	One Night: Joshua Vs. Ruiz	DAZN	DAZN, Balboa Productions	United States
Program Promotion	Nickelodeon Valentine’s Identy	Nickelodeon (Indian TV channel)	Viacom18	India
New Talent	Fort Irwin	Fantastic Fest	American Film Institute	United States

== Gold Winners 2019 Venice TV Award ==
Category	Title	Broadcaster	Production	Country
Best Series	Chernobyl	Sky Atlantic, HBO	Sister Pictures, The Mighty Mint, Word Games	United Kingdom
Best TV-Film	Ce soir la	France TV	Caminando productions and EndemolShine Fiction	France
Documentary	Hostage(s)	Canal+	10.7	France
Comedy	Don't Forget the Driver	BBC Two	Hootenanny, a Sister Pictures company	United Kingdom
Best Technical Quality	Eurovision Song Contest 2019	KAN	KAN	Israel
Performing Arts	The Art of Drumming	Sky Arts	Wall to Wall Media	United Kingdom
Light Entertainment	Special Delivery	Mediacorp Channel 5	The Moving Visuals Co.	Singapore
Cross-Platform	BBD Urgent	Gloob	Gloob / Conspiração Filmes	Brasil
Children/Youth	My Life I Will Survive	CBBC	Blakeway North	United Kingdom
Reality-TV	Filthy Rich & Homeless, Series 2	SBS Television	Blackfella Films	Australia
Branded Entertainment	Washed By The Sea	Canal OFF	Canal OFF / Roostercorp	Brasil
News	Brides & Brothels: The Rohingya Trade	Al Jazeera English	101 East	Malaysia
Sport	Far From Home	Olympic Channel	Boardwalk Pictures	Global
Program Promotion	Nickelodeon Mom & Brat Ident	Nickelodeon-India	Viacom18 Media	India
New Talents	The Walking Fish	-	HALAL	The Netherlands

== Gold Winners 2018 Venice TV Award ==
Category	Title	Broadcaster	Production	Country
Documentary	Mosul	Frontline (PBS), Channel 4	Mongoose Pictures	United States / United Kingdom
Performing Arts	Carmen	France Télévisions	Wahoo-Production	France
Light Entertainment	Cruising with Jane McDonald	Channel 5 (UK)	Elephant House Studios	United Kingdom
Children/Youth	ZombieLars	NRK Super	Torden Film	Norway
Reality-TV	Employable Me	Australian Broadcasting Corporation	Northern Pictures	Australia
Cross-Platform	Bigg Boss 11	Colors	Viacom18 Media	India
Branded Entertainment	Route Awakening Season3	National Geographic (Asia)	Sitting In Pictures	Singapore
Sport	Regnbågshjältar / Rainbow Heroes	Sveriges Television / Sveriges Television	Filmriding and Swedish Television	Sweden
Program Promotion	PRIMA Krimi Brand Identity	Prima TV	Department for TV PRIMA	Czech Republic
Technical High Quality	Fifa World Cup 2018	Nova TV	Nova TV	Croatia
Comedy	De Luizenmoeder	AVROTROS / NPO 3	Bing Film & TV BV	The Netherlands
Best Series	4 Blocks	TNT Serie	Wiedemann & Berg	Germany
Best TV-Film	Summer of ’44 – The Lost Generation	ARD	Zieglerfilm Baden Baden	Germany
Best Talent	Wave	-	Assembly	Ireland
