= Wojtek Memorial Trust =

Scottish charity

- Formation: 2009
- Type: Charity
- Location: Edinburgh, Scotland

The Wojtek Memorial Trust was a Scottish Charity (SCO41057) established in 2009 to celebrate the life of Wojtek, "the Soldier Bear", the lives of those who knew him, and their stories during and after the Second World War. The Trust also aimed to promote wider understanding of the many historic and current links between the peoples of Poland and Scotland.

== Wojtek Statue in Edinburgh ==
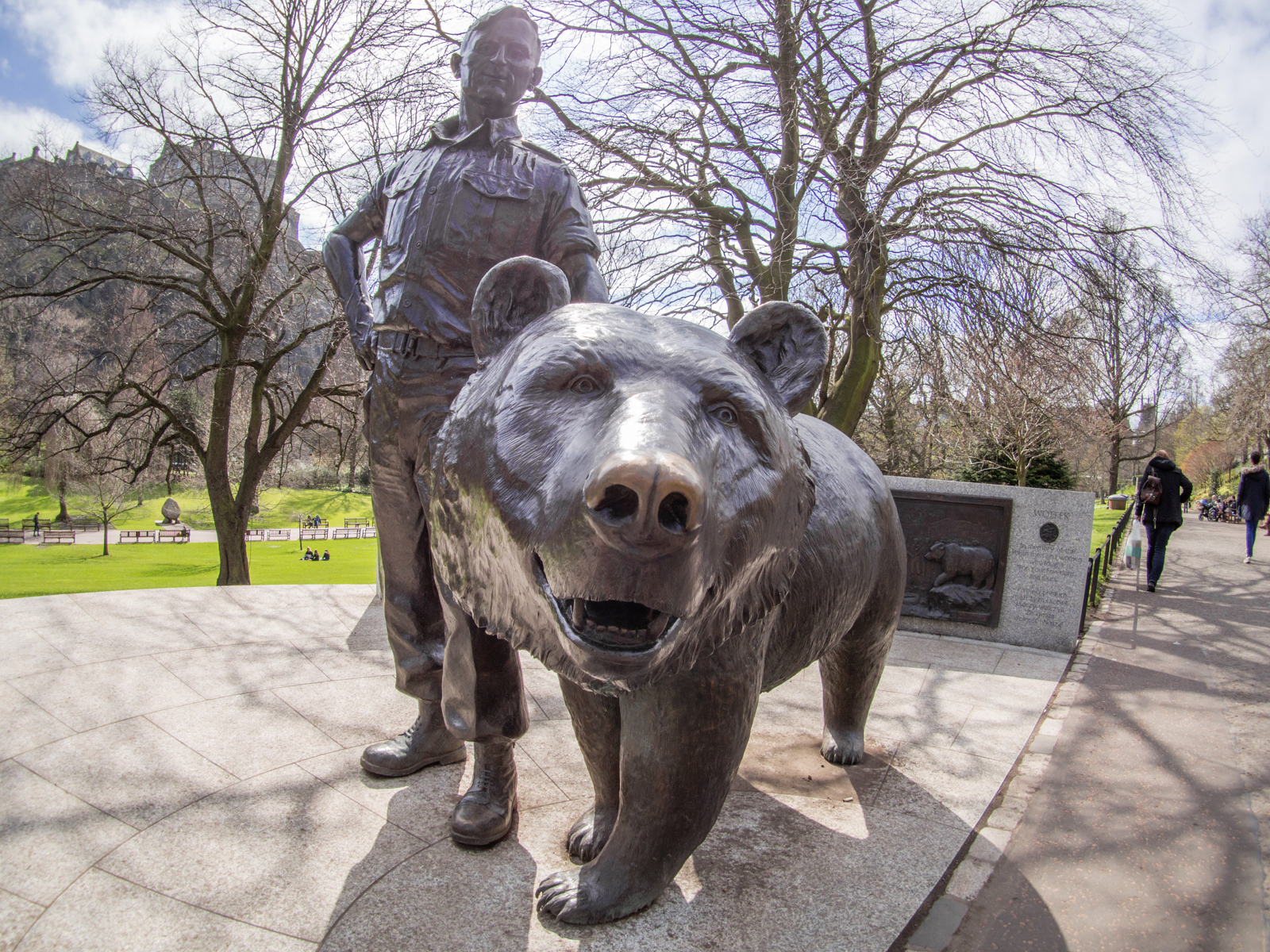
Statue of Wojtek in Princes Street Gardens, Edinburgh

The Trust commissioned a memorial to honour Wojtek, and remember the courage of all Polish soldiers. It is located in Princes Street Garden in Edinburgh, Scotland. Planning permission was received from the City of Edinburgh Council on 16 September 2013 (13/02699/FUL). The memorial takes the form of a life and a quarter bronze statue of a Polish soldier with Wojtek, and a 4m low relief pictorial panel set on a granite platform. The ambition was to source the granite from Poland so that the soldier and the bear can stand on a piece of Polish homeland. The sculptor is Alan Beattie Herriot and the caster Powderhall Bronze in Edinburgh. Its setting was designed by Raymond Muszynski of Morris and Steedman Associates.

The statue is located on the terrace walk at the west end of Princes Street Gardens, on the south side of the main terrace at the corner of a pathway leading down into the main area of the gardens. The figures are standing, waiting to engage with the passers by. This is an important part of the story for this most sociable bear and his keeper. Wide stone steps will provide a welcome seating point from which to view the gardens. The pictorial panel animates the story and provides a sensitive new feature in the gardens. It is also cast in bronze. Planting behind the panel of beech and hawthorn reflects the flora of the country lanes in Berwickshire, where Wojtek lived at Winfield Camp. Hawthorn is the symbol of love and beech is the symbol of prosperity and friendship.

The artistry of the sculpture is appreciated from Princes Street looking down into the gardens; at the terrace level as a walking encounter with the bear and his keeper; and looking up from the lower path to see the statue in a natural elevation. Furthermore, the aspect to the castle is reminiscent of that which faced the soldiers at the final Battle of Monte Cassino in May 1944 as they fought their way up the slopes assisted by Wojtek.

== Wojtek Memorial Trust Tartan ==
To commemorate Wojtek's story, and the links between Poland and Scotland in another form, the Wojtek Memorial Trust designed an official tartan, with the help of Kinloch Anderson Ltd. The Wojtek Memorial Trust Tartan is based on the Roxburgh sett because Wojtek visited Springwood Park, Kelso owned by the Duke of Roxburgh when he arrived in Scotland. The vibrant red colour of the tartan reflects the Polish flag whilst the red “ribbon-like lines” are a reminder of the red and white ribbons soldiers bought from local women in Persia to sew onto their uniforms to identify themselves as the Polish Army. The colours of the Polish flag and the Scottish flag sit together in the design to represent the special relationship between Poland and Scotland. The two shades of green reflect the countryside of the Scottish Borders and the Leslie tartan trews which were worn by the King’s Own Scottish Borderers Regiment. The single sand over-check is a reminder of the desert lands of the Middle East and of Wojtek’s soft brown fur. Within the tartan design it is symbolically placed in the heart of the Scottish Borders green, representing where both the Polish soldiers and Wojtek found friendship and a new homeland.
