= Wojtek =

Bear in the Polish army (1942–1963)

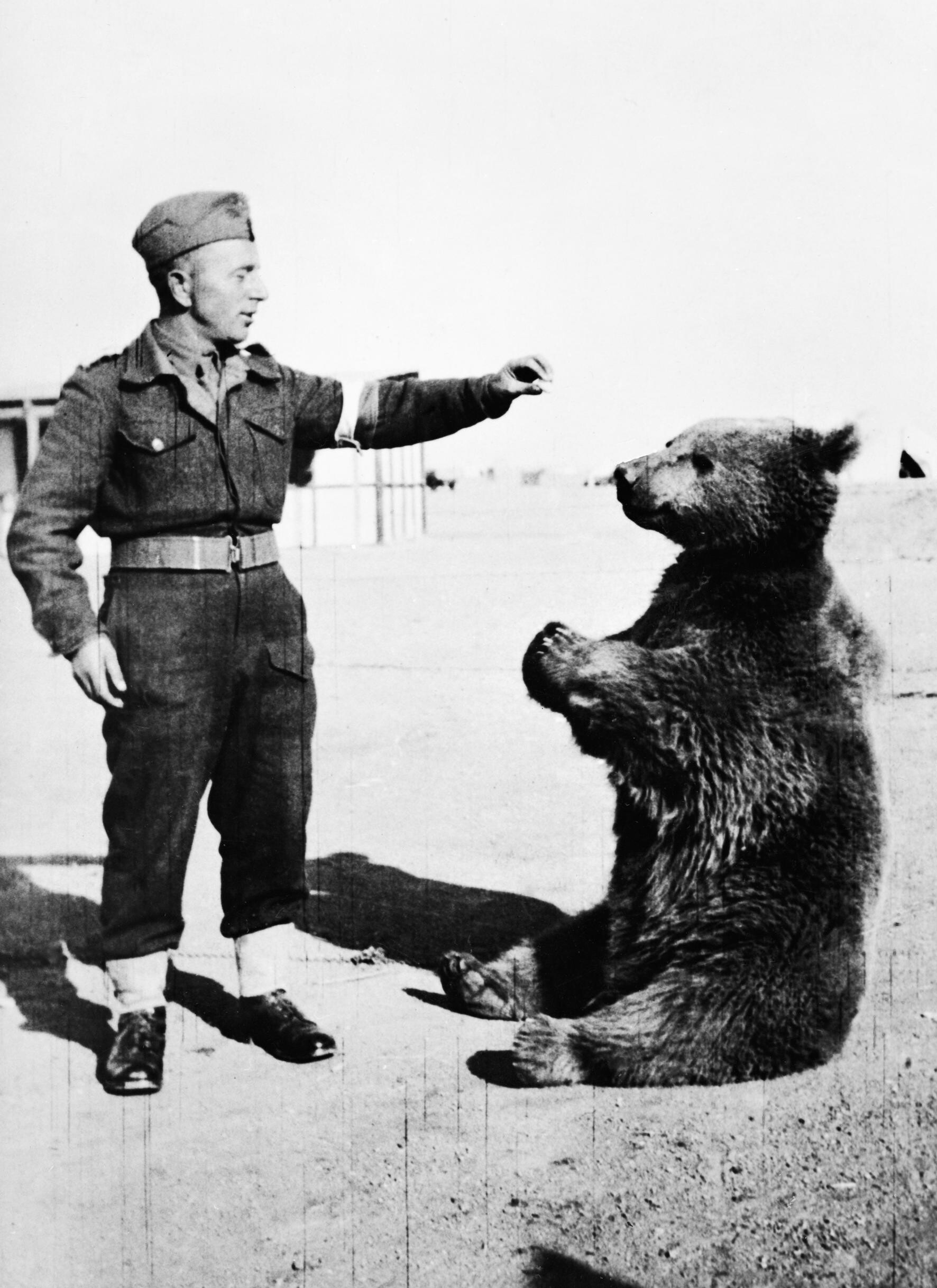
- Polish soldier with Wojtek
- Born: 1942; Hamadan, Iran
- Died: 2 December 1963 (aged 21); Edinburgh Zoo, Scotland
- Military career
- Allegiance: Poland
- Branch: Polish Land Forces
- Service years: 1943–1945
- Rank: Corporal
- Nickname: The Soldier Bear
- Service number: 253
- Units: 3522, 22nd Artillery Supply Company, 2nd Polish Corps
- Conflicts: World War II: Battle of Monte Cassino
- Memorials: Wojtek Memorial Trust
- Website: thesoldierbear.com

Wojtek (1942 – 2 December 1963; Polish pronunciation: [ˈvɔjtɛk]; in English sometimes phonetically spelled Voytek) was a Syrian brown bear. He was purchased (accounts differ) by Polish soldiers from an Iranian shepherd near Hamadan, Iran, during World War II. Wojtek accompanied the 2nd Polish Corps to Italy, serving under the 22nd Artillery Supply Company.

In 1944, during the Battle of Monte Cassino, Wojtek is said to have imitated his human comrades, carrying ammunition crates. He was promoted from private to corporal and became a celebrity with visiting Allied generals and statesmen. After the war, he was mustered out of the Polish Army and lived out the rest of his life in Scotland at the Edinburgh Zoo.

== Life ==
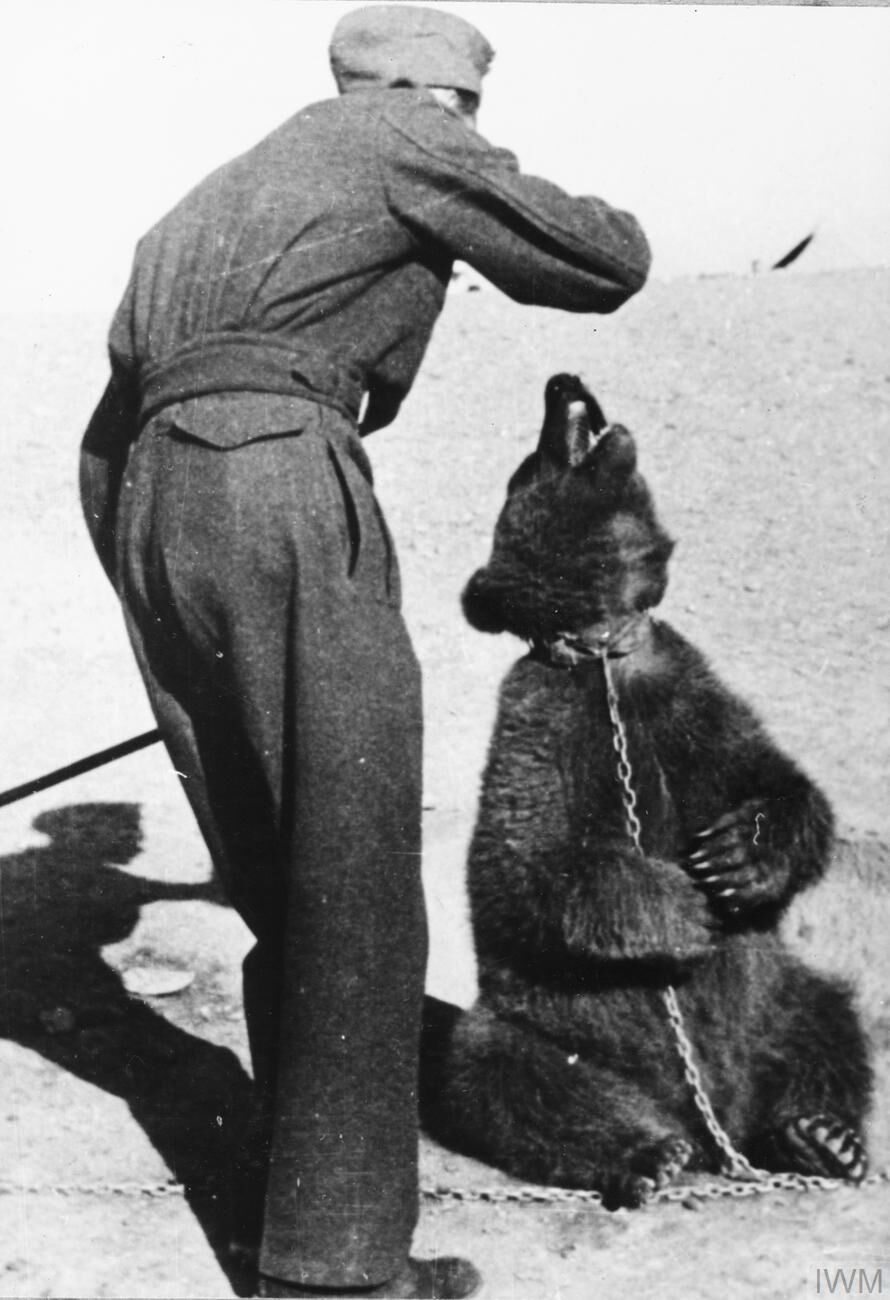
Wojtek and a Polish soldier

=== Adoption ===
In the spring of 1942, the newly formed Anders' Army left the Soviet Union for Iran, accompanied by thousands of Polish civilians who had been deported to the Soviet Union following the 1939 Soviet invasion of eastern Poland.

On the journey from Pahlavi to Tehran, Iran, on 8 April 1942, Polish soldiers encountered a young Iranian boy who had found a bear cub whose mother had been shot by hunters. One of the civilian refugees in their midst, 18-year-old Irena (Inka) Bokiewicz, the great-niece of General Bolesław Wieniawa-Długoszowski, was very taken with the cub. She prompted Lieutenant Anatol Tarnowiecki to buy the young bear, which spent the next three months in a Polish refugee camp established near Tehran, principally under Irena's care. In August, the bear was donated to the 2nd Transport Company, which later became the 22nd Artillery Supply Company, and he was named Wojtek by the soldiers.

=== Nutrition and growth ===
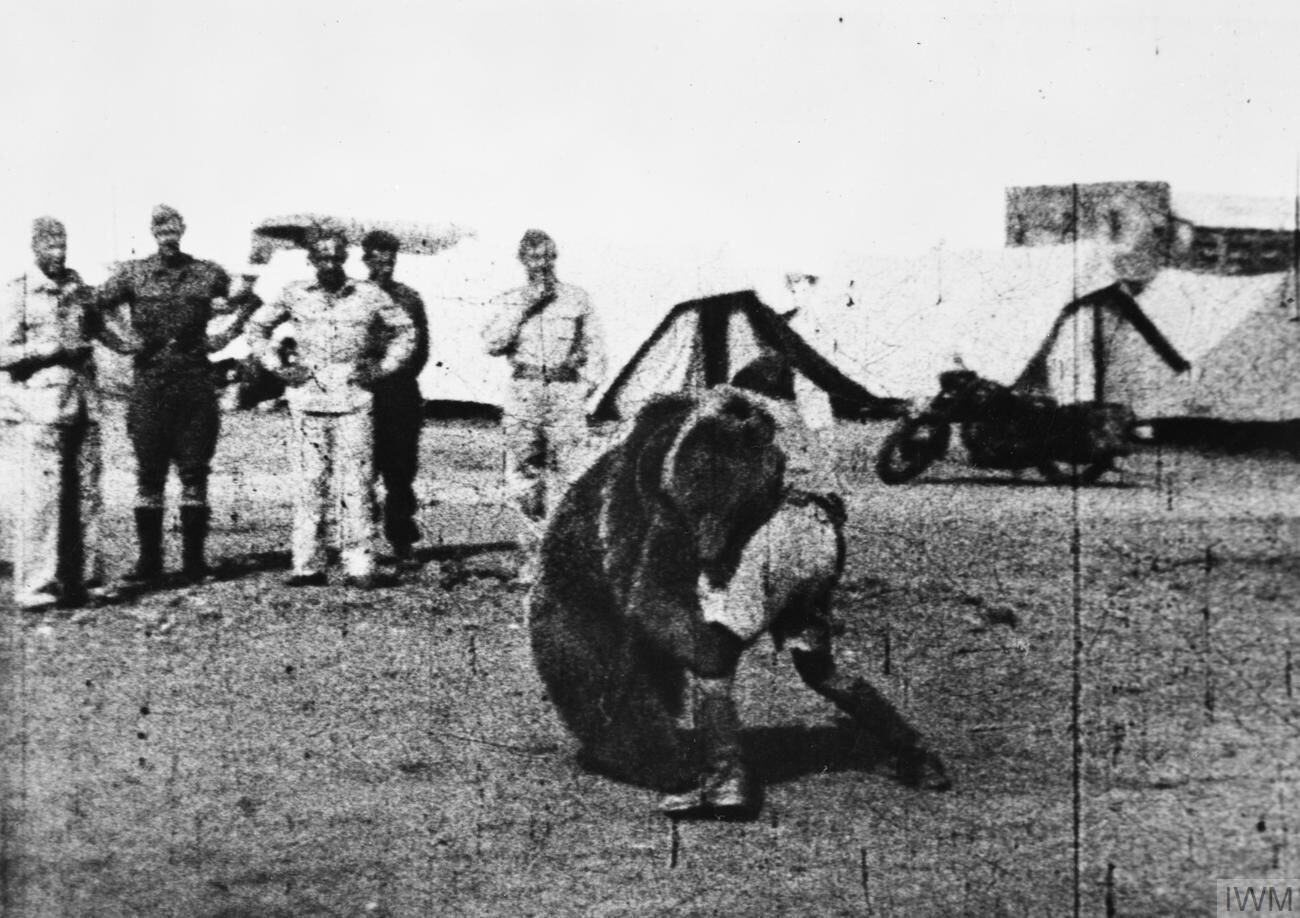
Wojtek play-wrestling with a Polish soldier

Wojtek initially had problems swallowing and was fed condensed milk from an old vodka bottle. He was subsequently given fruit, marmalade, honey, and syrup, and was often rewarded with beer, which became his favourite drink. He later also enjoyed smoking (or eating) cigarettes, as well as drinking coffee in the mornings. He also slept with the other soldiers if they were cold at night. He enjoyed wrestling with the soldiers and was taught to salute when greeted. He became an attraction for soldiers and civilians alike, and soon became an unofficial mascot to all the units stationed nearby. With the 22nd Company, he moved to Iraq, and then through Syria, Egypt and Italy.

Wojtek copied the other soldiers, drinking beer, smoking, and even marching alongside them on his hind legs. Wojtek had his own caregiver, assigned to look after him. The cub grew up while on campaign, and by the time of the Battle of Monte Cassino, he weighed 90 kg (14 st; 200 lb).

=== Soldier Wojtek ===
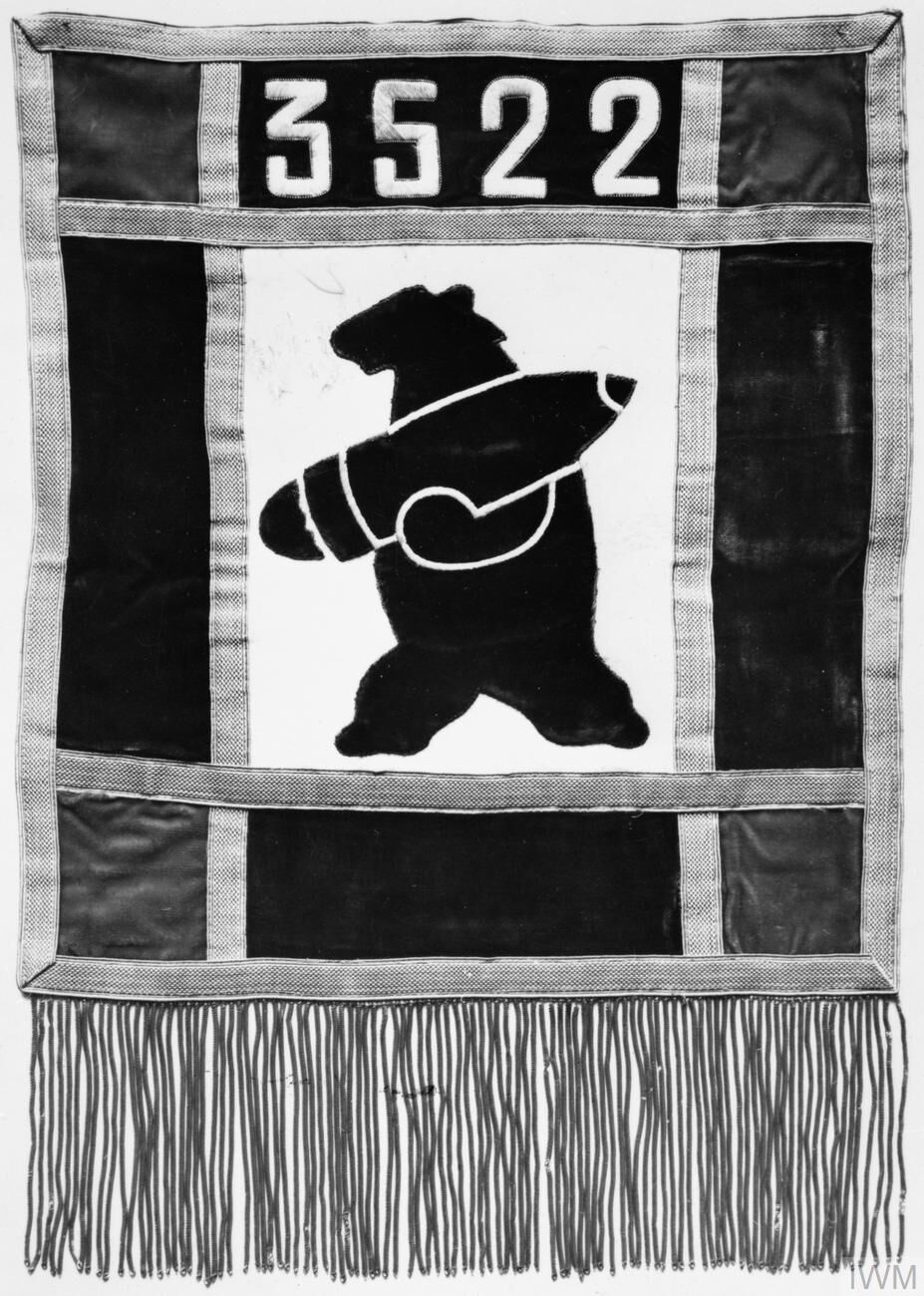
Wojtek with artillery shell: Emblem of 22nd Artillery Supply Company

From Egypt, the Polish II Corps was reassigned to fight alongside the British Eighth Army, famous from North African battles such as El Alamein and from the Italian campaign. Regulations for the British transport ship that was to carry them to Italy forbade mascot and pet animals. To get around this restriction, Wojtek was officially drafted into the Polish Army as a private and listed among the soldiers of the 22nd Artillery Supply Company. Henryk Zacharewicz and Dymitr Szawlugo were assigned as his caretakers.

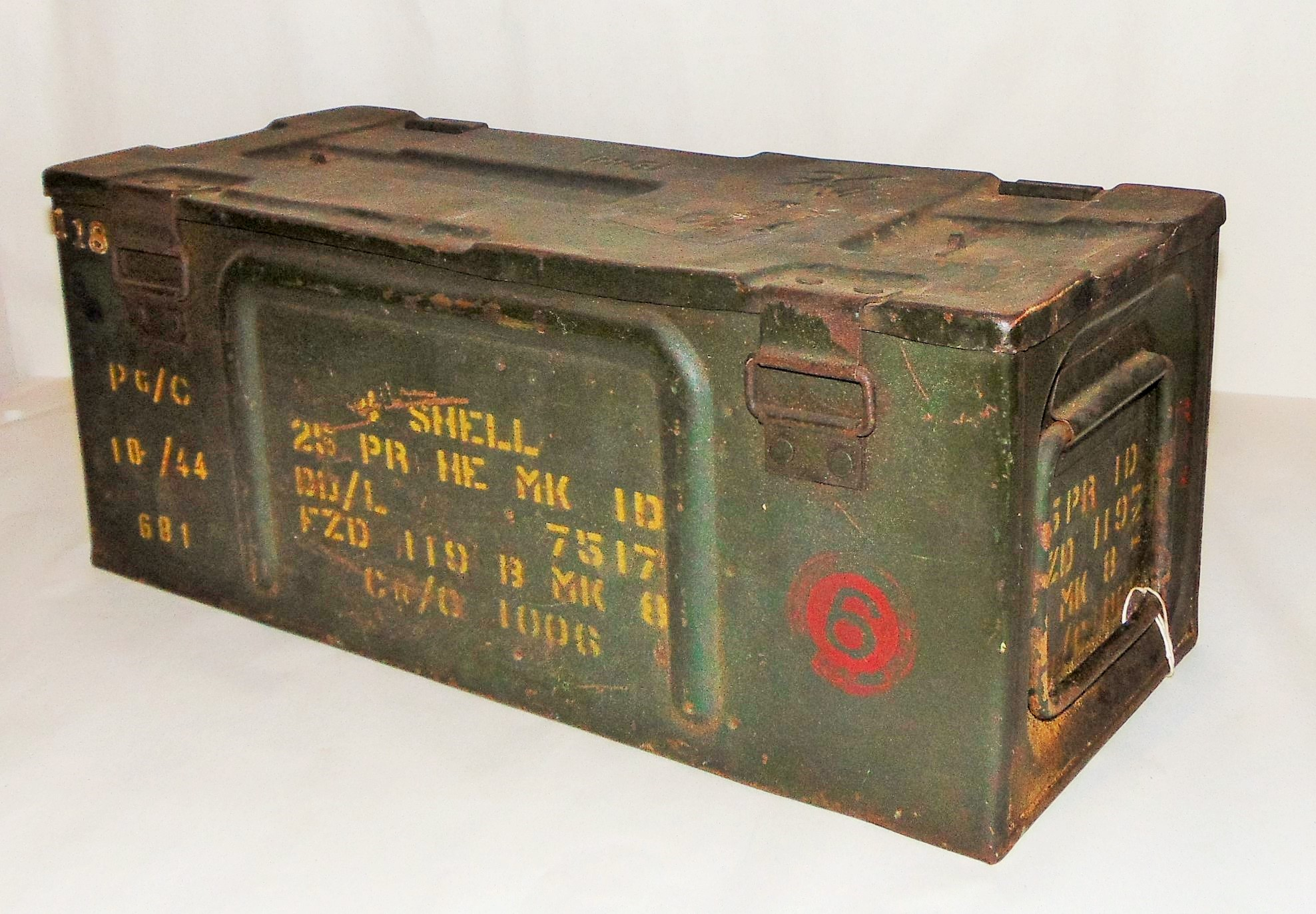
A standard 25-pounder ammunition crate, which held four shells

As an enlisted soldier with his own paybook, rank, and serial number, he lived with the other men in tents or in a special wooden crate, which was transported by truck. During the Battle of Monte Cassino, Wojtek helped his unit convey ammunition by carrying 100-pound (45 kg) crates of 25-pound artillery shells, never dropping any of them. While this story generated debate over its accuracy, at least one account exists of a British soldier recalling seeing a bear carrying crates of ammunition. The bear mimicked the soldiers: when he saw the men lifting crates, he copied them. Wojtek carried boxes that normally required four men, which he would stack onto a truck or other ammunition boxes. After the Polish victory, Wojtek became a celebrity among visiting Allied generals and statesmen. This service also earned him promotion to the rank of corporal. In recognition of Wojtek's popularity, a depiction of a bear carrying an artillery shell was adopted as the official emblem of the 22nd Company.

=== Postwar ===
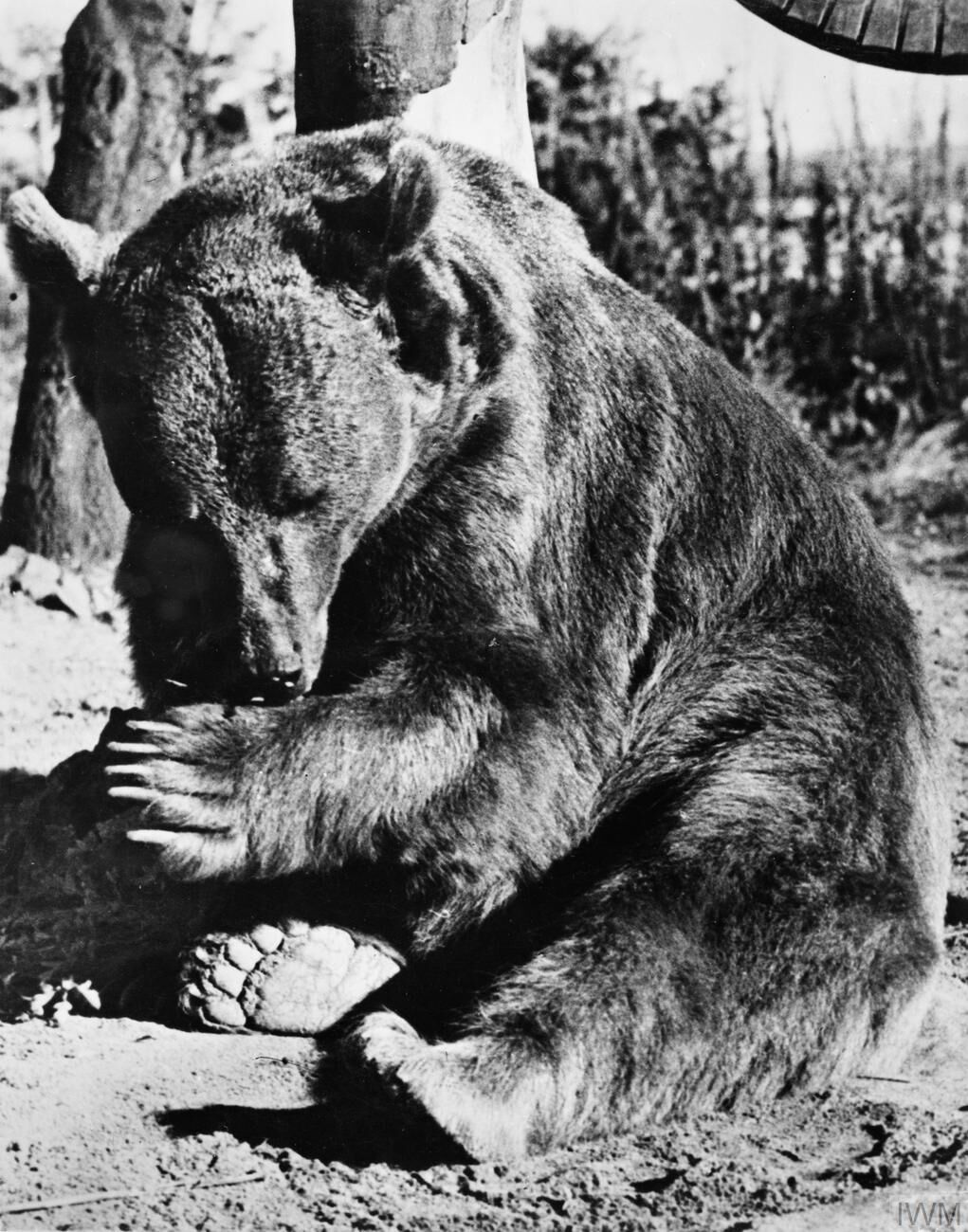
Wojtek in Britain after the war

After the end of World War II in 1945, Wojtek was transported to Berwickshire, Scotland, with the rest of the 22nd Company through the Polish Resettlement Corps. They were stationed at Winfield Airfield on Sunwick Farm, near the village of Hutton, Scottish Borders. Wojtek soon became popular among local civilians and the press, and the Polish-Scottish Association made him an honorary member.

Following demobilisation on 15 November 1947, Wojtek was given to Edinburgh Zoo, where he spent the rest of his life, often visited by journalists and former Polish soldiers, some of whom tossed cigarettes for him to eat, as he did during his time in the army. He still happily responded to being spoken to in Polish, recognizing many of his former unit. Media attention contributed to Wojtek's popularity. He was a frequent guest on BBC television's Blue Peter programme for children.

Wojtek died 2 December 1963, aged 21, of natural causes, weighing nearly 500 kg (1,100 lb), and reaching over 1.8 m (5 ft 11 in) tall.

== Legacy ==
- The many memorials to the soldier-bear include a plaque within the collection of Imperial War Museum; a sculpture by David Harding in the Sikorski Museum, in London; and a wooden sculpture in Weelsby Woods, Grimsby.
- In 2013, the Kraków city council gave permission for the erection of a statue of Wojtek in the city's Jordan Park. It was unveiled on 18 May 2014, the 70th anniversary of the Battle of Monte Cassino.
- In 2013, the City of Edinburgh Council approved the erection of a bronze statue of Wojtek, by Alan Beattie Herriot, to stand in the city's West Princes Street Gardens. Unveiled in 2015, it presents Wojtek and a fellow Polish Army soldier walking together. An accompanying relief documents Wojtek's journey from Egypt to Scotland with the Polish Army.
- In 2016, a statue of Wojtek was unveiled in Duns, in the Scottish Borders. Wojtek had been stationed at the nearby Winfield Camp in 1946, alongside Polish troops. The statue was donated by the Polish town of Żagań, Duns's twin town, and was unveiled on 26 April 72 years after the Battle of Monte Cassino, which involved Polish forces, including Wojtek.
- In 2017, a street in Poznań, Poland, was named after Wojtek. The street, now named ulica Kaprala Wojtka (Corporal Wojtek Street), leads to the Poznań New Zoo.
- In September 2018, a wooden statue of Wojtek was unveiled in the Poznań New Zoo, funded by Krystyna Wieczorek, the author of a Polish book about Wojtek.
- In May 2019, a marble statue of Wojtek was unveiled in Cassino, Italy.
- In May 2019, a statue of Wojtek was unveiled in Szczecin, Poland.
- Since 1 September 2019, the 80th anniversary of the outbreak of World War II, a Wojtek the Bear Monument has had a permanent place in Sopot, overlooking the street named after the Battle of Monte Cassino, in which he famously played a role.
- In 2024, the story of Wojtek was adapted into a play by writer Allan Pollock at Coventry's Albany Theater based on his children's book The Bear Who Went To War.
- In 2024, the 28-minute animated short film A Bear Named Wojtek (2023), directed by Iain Gardner, was released and went on to be nominated for 17 awards, including the Animated Short Film category of the Academy Awards.

== See also ==
- List of individual bears
- Winnipeg (bear)
