= The Rubbish World of Dave Spud =

British television series

- Genre: Comedy-adventure; Animated sitcom Fantasy; Deadpan humor
- Created by: Edward Foster
- Directed by: Edward Foster
- Voices of: Johnny Vegas; Lisa Hammond; Philip Glenister; Arthur Smith; Jane Horrocks; Gina Yashere; Akiya Henry; Adam Gillen; David Holt
- Composer: Basement Jaxx
- Country of origin: United Kingdom
- Original language: English
- No. of series: 3
- No. of episodes: 104

Production
- Producer: Iain Harvey
- Running time: 11 minutes
- Production companies: The Illuminated Film Company; Cloth Cat Animation

Original release
- Network: CITV (seasons 1–3); ITVX (season 3)
- Release: 2 September 2019 – 12 September 2024

The Rubbish World of Dave Spud (shortened to Dave Spud) is a British children's animated sitcom featuring the surreal adventures of the eponymous Dave Spud of Grimsby (voiced by Johnny Vegas), his friends and tower block-dwelling family. It was created and directed by Edward Foster, inspired by his 2003 NFTS student short 'Anna Spud'. It was developed into a pilot in 2010 produced by The Illuminated Film Company. 26 11-minute instalments were commissioned, whilst the soundtrack was composed by electronic group Basement Jaxx. In May 2020, for series 2 a further 52 installments were commissioned. Series 3 aired its first 6 episodes on CITV in July 2023. Series 3, as well as the whole show, ended on 12 September 2024.

On 1 September 2023, The Rubbish World of Dave Spud was the final programme to air on the CITV network, before the channel closed and the show's run moved to ITVX.

== Production ==
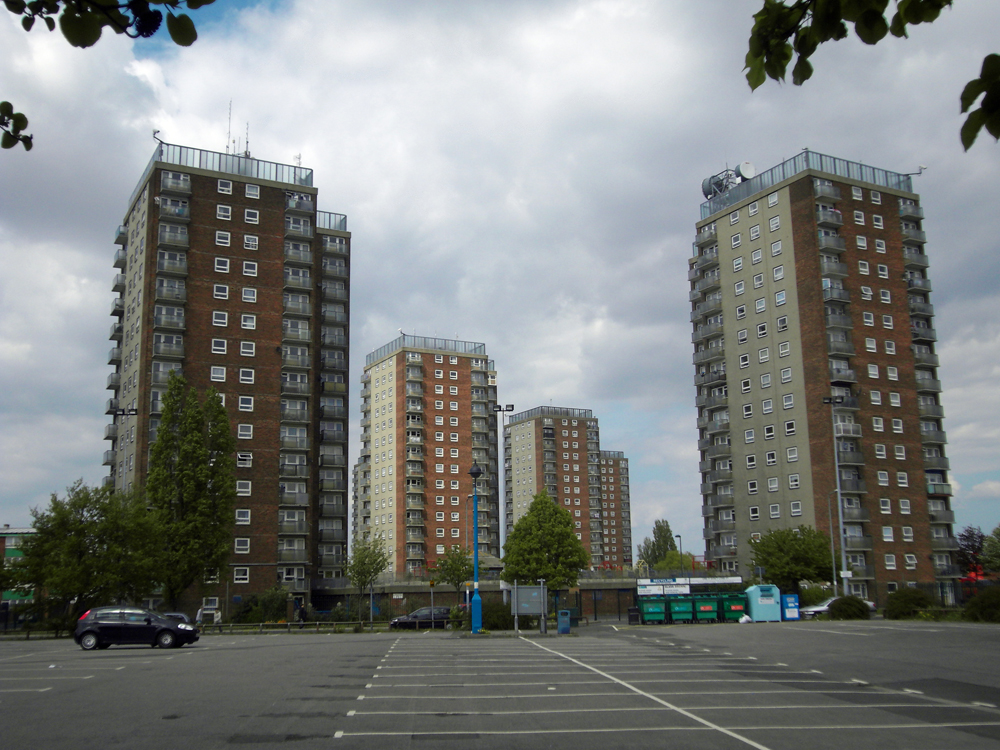
The Spuds' tower-block home was inspired by the high-rise development on Grimsby's East Marsh, which was demolished in 2018.

The Rubbish World of Dave Spud was created by Edward Foster, who had previously worked as series director of Little Princess, and was adapted from his National Film and Television School student film Anna Spud (2003). Foster stated that the theme of the show was to "give the biggest adventure to the one who least expects it, to the one who isn’t holding up their hand or even looking. Giving it to them."

The series is set in the Lincolnshire town of Grimsby, and although several of its landmarks are featured, such as the Spuds' tower block (similar to the former high-rise on East Marsh) and the dock, Foster has stated the Grimsby featured in the show is intended to be purely fictional. A pilot was commissioned in 2010, and two years later was commissioned as a full series, but Foster decided to take a hiatus from the industry for a couple of years, which put production on hold until 2017.

Awards - winner of Royal Television Society Programme Award for Best Children's Programme 2022 and the Best Children's series at the 2024 British Animation Awards.

== Voice cast ==
- Johnny Vegas as Dave Spud
- Lisa Hammond as Anna Spud
- Philip Glenister as Betty Spud (Mum)
- Arthur Smith as George Spud (Dad)
- Jane Horrocks as Gran Spud
- Gina Yashere as Gareth
- Akiya Henry as Little Sue
- Adam Gillen as Robert Robot
- David Holt as Fuzzypeg, The Twins, Donald
- Additional voices: David Holt, Roger Griffiths, Dave Peacock, Edward Foster, Inel Tomlinson

== Episodes ==
=== Series 1 (2019) ===
| No. | Title | Written by | Original release date |
|---|---|---|---|
| 1 | "A Starfish Called Gareth" | Edward Foster | 2 September 2019 |
George takes the family to Craggy Cliffs for a holiday, but thanks to Dave and Anna the camper van ends up in the sea, where they encounter a talking starfish named Gareth who decides to join the family.
| 2 | "Donkey" | Denise Cassar | 2 September 2019 |
Using Gran's pants money, Dave saves an endangered donkey from being turned into food. Later Gran suddenly falls in love with it, after losing her glasses.
| 3 | "A Whaley Good Time" | Denise Cassar | 3 September 2019 |
An indoor football game goes wrong when Fuzzypeg eats the Spuds' fish supper. Dave is sent out to catch another one but ends up catching a whale.
| 4 | "Born Free" | Edward Foster | 3 September 2019 |
Dave's dad George takes Dave on a camping trip, taking most of the house's electronics with them. However, Dave thinks it’s not a good idea like they did last time. Anna, the twins, Betty, and Gran get robbed, and everyone wakes up inside a bears cave.
| 5 | "Culture" | Dave Ingham | 4 September 2019 |
The Spuds take a trip to the museum of cheese. Dave and Anna begin to lick different kinds of cheese which leads to bizarre results.
| 6 | "Bored Silly" | James Moran | 4 September 2019 |
Gran unintentionally wins a board game that hasn't been used for years but when the Spuds start to play, the game acts on its own and magically makes anything real within each turn.
| 7 | "Blinking Heck" | Alex Collier | 5 September 2019 |
Betty wants a nice photo of Dave and Anna, so George uses Gran's Camera, but it comes to life and begins to steal souls, due to an ancient mummy's curse.
| 8 | "Wishes" | Dave Ingham | 5 September 2019 |
Dave comes across a statue of an Ice Cream Man which comes to life and grants Dave three wishes, with predictably chaotic results.
| 9 | "Crush" | Denise Cassar | 6 September 2019 |
Dave falls in love with a toilet cleaner called Chuffy Peaches. The two begin to hang out together until Dave discovers that Chuffy is actually an alien who wants to turn Earth into a toilet.
| 10 | "Bike" | Dave Ingham | 6 September 2019 |
Dave's parents design a bike for Dave so he can take part in a school cycling test, but the brakes fail and Dave's bike won't stop.
| 11 | "Dig" | Steve Box | 9 September 2019 |
Betty wants her son Dave to find a hobby, so he takes up treasure hunting below the apartment block and undermines its foundations, causing it to tilt.
| 12 | "Sports Day" | Edward Foster | 9 September 2019 |
It's the school's Sports Day and Dave and his friends try to get their first win of the year.
| 13 | "Growing Pains" | Ciaran Murtagh and Andrew Barnett Jones | 10 September 2019 |
Dave is given a bulb to grow. He decides to give it to Gran for her birthday, but she isn't keen on her own birthday, so he hides it in his lunchbox. When the bulb is connected to the sandwiches it grows very quickly.
| 14 | "Fuzzypeg" | Edward Foster | 10 September 2019 |
The Spuds' washing machine spins so rapidly it creates a black hole in the wall behind it. The hole begins to suck things into space, including Fuzzypeg.
| 15 | "Were Gran" | Alex Collier | 11 September 2019 |
Things get weird during a full moon in Grimsby. When Gran nabs a pair of sharp teeth after losing her own pair, the teeth begin to turn other Spuds into Were-Grans.
| 16 | "Get Lost" | Ciaran Murtagh and Andrew Barnett Jones | 11 September 2019 |
George wins tickets to a local stately home (getting his arm stuck straight in the process). The house turns out to be the home of chaos theory, and Dave and Anna sneakily enter a maze filled with surprise and get themselves lost.
| 17 | "Freeze a Jolly spud Fellow" | Alex Collier | 12 September 2019 |
During a hot summer, Dave finds a way to keep the house cooler, but by the next day the house becomes a winter wonderland.
| 18 | "Exchange" | Tim Bain | 12 September 2019 |
Dave demands to go on a "foreign exchange". Upon arriving to his destination (which is a few flats down), he discovers the family who live there look just like his own, but nicer. Meanwhile the nicer version of Dave meets the original Dave's family.
| 19 | "Bad Computer" | Dave Ingham | 13 September 2019 |
George finds a computer called Val who has a mind of her own. But when she uploads Betty during the night and goes viral, Dave must find a way to delete the video.
| 20 | "The Coat" | Steve Box and Edward Foster | 13 September 2019 |
After Dave's old coat is tattered, Gran finds a replacement near the park bin. Dave wears the coat, but it turns out to be much bigger on the inside than the outside and he becomes lost in it.
| 21 | "Bog Roll Roll" | Tim Bain | 16 September 2019 |
With the help of Betty, Dave must learn her technique in order to win at the biggest sporting event in Grimsby, Bog Roll Roll.
| 22 | "Spud-ageddon" | Tim Bain | 16 September 2019 |
The Spuds don't care about a carbon footprint and prefer to use all their electronics all the time. When an unhappy cloud shows up, the Spuds flee in terror.
| 23 | "Rat Pack" | Dave Ingham | 17 September 2019 |
Dave was given a recorder, instead of drums that he wanted to try. When he starts playing it, a swarm of rats begin to follow him.
| 24 | "Flea Man" | Ciaran Murtagh and Andrew Barnett Jones | 17 September 2019 |
After Dave and Fuzzypeg become dirty from playing at the dump, Fuzzypeg picks up a grumpy flea which bites Dave, granting him flea-like powers.
| 25 | "Spuds on a Plane" | Denise Cassar | 18 September 2019 |
The Spuds go on holiday on a plane, but when Dave desperately goes to the toilet his head swells up.
| 26 | "The Wrinkly Bus" | Edward Foster | 18 September 2019 |
While the rest of the Spuds visit the doctor, Dave is given the task of looking after Gran, but she escapes.

=== Series 2 (2020–21) ===
| No. | Title | Written by | Original release date |
|---|---|---|---|
| 27 | "Moth Gran" | Edward Foster | 28 December 2020 |
Gran has been sitting on the comfy chair for a week; she turns into a cocoon and then later a moth.
| 28 | "The Beast of Grimsby" | Dave Ingham | 29 December 2020 |
George takes Dave, Anna and their friend Zombie Katie to the park to find some endangered animals for their project at school.
| 29 | "Chow Wow" | Ciaran Murtagh and Andrew Barnett Jones | 30 December 2020 |
Dave enters Fuzzypeg into a competition to become the new face of a dog food brand. But when his dog wins, Dave begins to miss him and tries to find a way to terminate the contract.
| 30 | "The Throne" | Hannah George | 31 December 2020 |
Gran buys a new toilet but after using it she is sucked into another dimension where everything is ruled by Li'l Sue.
| 31 | "Grimmest Face" | Matt Baker | 27 February 2021 |
Dave is practising for the grimmest face competition. He manage to get his face, literally, upside down but when the winds change direction, it gets stuck like that.
| 32 | "Breaking Gran" | Tim Bain | 28 February 2021 |
Due to Gran's bad behaviour, she is sent to an old people's home. As she isn't enjoying it there, it's up to the Spuds to break her free.
| 33 | "Two Toots Spud" | Edward Foster | 6 March 2021 |
During the School Orienteering exercise, Dave and his friends get lost thanks to Robert Robot and are snatched by a flock of giant tiger pigeons, and now Dave must go inside Robert to get the map and get them back to school.
| 34 | "The Grimsby Mermaid" | Ciaran Murtagh and Andrew Barnett Jones | 7 March 2021 |
Dave meets a mermaid called Trisha, who he invites to his house for tea, she enjoys her visit so much she decides to sleep over in the Spuds' bathtub.
| 35 | "Venice of the North" | Dave Ingham | 13 March 2021 |
Dave and his friends embark on a school trip along the canal. When Dave accidentally releases the rope the boat drags him and his friends away from the rest of the school. As they enjoy partying in the boat, they awaken a creature called Big Lippy which pushes them into the waterfall, sending them to the Jurassic Era.
| 36 | "Zombie Apocalypse" | Denise Cassar | 14 March 2021 |
Dave finds an old handheld game at the dump which involves killing zombies. Zombie Katie finds the game insulting and gets revenge on Dave by raising the dead.
| 37 | "The Grimsby Meteor" | Dave Ingham | 20 March 2021 |
Dave is warned by local fortune teller, Madam Donald, that if he walks under a ladder bad luck will occur. Dave doesn't believe it and goes under one anyway, and soon a meteor is heading straight to Grimsby. Now Dave must find a way to catch it before the town gets destroyed.
| 38 | "Magic" | Madeleine Brettingham | 21 March 2021 |
Zombie Katie bestows a magic book for Anna and trades it for her witch hat. Anna practices a spell from the book on George and turns him into a bap, but when she tries to change him back, she ends up making Grimsby disappear.
| 39 | "Delivery Dave" | Tim Bain | 27 March 2021 |
In order to get money to buy new wheels for his bike, Dave applies to a job at Li'l Sue's business. But Anna also applies the job, believing she could deliver packages quicker than Dave.
| 40 | "Barry" | Matt Baker | 28 March 2021 |
Dave wins an electronic home device at a slideshow game called Barry. When his family bosses him around, the device becomes overwhelmed and takes control of Grimsby Heights.
| 41 | "Burning Wheels" | Hannah George | 6 September 2021 |
Dave is sent down to the basement to find what is stopping the bath from working. There he meets a skateboarder called Josh Gnarly.
| 42 | "Funnyfins" | Tim Bain | 6 September 2021 |
Dave discovers that his pet goldfish has returned from the dead.
| 43 | "Do Zombies Dream of Banana Custard?" | Ciaran Murtagh and Andrew Barnett Jones | 7 September 2021 |
Zombie Katie is so fascinated by Gran's Sweets that her life force leaves her body. Dave and his friends must find her life force quickly.
| 44 | "Space Fabric and Time" | Madeleine Brettingham | 7 September 2021 |
Dave accidentally rips the fabric of space causing time to jump around and gravity to leak out. Now Dave must fix the tear before everything gets sucked in.
| 45 | "Cheesy Dreams" | Dave Ingham | 8 September 2021 |
Dave consumes a cheesecake which was not meant for him. At bedtime, he gets stuck into a cheesy dream with the rest of his family. The only way to escape is to admit everything he has done and confront his guilt.
| 46 | "Krustee Sloth" | Kirsty Peart and Jess Kedward | 8 September 2021 |
Using pieces given away free with every box of Bran Cran Krustee Cereals, Dave and Anna build a toy sloth which is bigger than Grimsby Heights.
| 47 | "Cheer Grimsby" | Kirsty Peart and Jess Kedward | 9 September 2021 |
Dave and his friends become cheerleaders for their school's sports team and with Gran's help, they're going to create the best cheerleading performance the school has ever seen.
| 48 | "A Wig Improvement" | Hannah George | 9 September 2021 |
After Betty gives Dave bad hair ahead of the annual community disco, he finds a wig made from a donkey's hair. Soon he discovers the side effects of the wig.
| 49 | "Tiny Problem" | Ciaran Murtagh and Andrew Barnett Jones | 10 September 2021 |
The Spuds plans a seaside picnic for Anna's Birthday but Dave's party food has shrunk them down to the size of mugs.
| 50 | "Electrogran" | Madeleine Brettingham | 10 September 2021 |
Dave makes a weathervane during class which he tests on the rooftops of Grimsby Heights; things go wrong when his assistant Gran gets struck by lightning and is charged with electrical powers.
| 51 | "Fit is Fun" | Isabel Fay | 13 September 2021 |
The Spuds wants to become fit after watching strongman competitions, they order Gribits to get moving but cannot stop when they discover the devices were faulty.
| 52 | "Lucky Sausage" | Ciaran Murtagh and Andrew Barnett Jones | 13 September 2021 |
After helping an old lady called Tanya, Dave is rewarded a sausage as a thank you. But when he takes a bite of it, something lucky happens.
| 53 | "Happy Birthday Gareth" | Ben Ward | 14 September 2021 |
Dave makes a piñata that looks like his friend Gareth for her birthday for the Spuds to bash into pieces. Gareth thinks Dave hates her now and moves back to the sea.
| 54 | "King of the Dump" | Kirsty Peart and Jess Kedward | 14 September 2021 |
The school enlist Dave to a work placement with his dad at the dumps. Later he gets sucked into a dimension filled with rubbish, an old cow and fridges and is taught an important lesson about recycling.
| 55 | "Journey Into Fuzzypeg" | Madeleine Brettingham | 15 September 2021 |
Dave pet sits Li'l Sue's pet Flea, Mr Grumps: when Fuzzypeg eats him, Dave must find a way to get the flea out of Fuzzypeg's tummy.
| 56 | "Top Town of the North" | Hannah George | 15 September 2021 |
After having a bad day, Dave tells the news reporter that Grimsby is rubbish. When it is broadcast, the residents turn against him; now Dave must clear his name by making a film about how great Grimsby is.
| 57 | "The Whippets" | Hannah George | 16 September 2021 |
Dave is asked to replace a band member of his favourite group, The Whippets, after he discovers his body is a musical instrument.
| 58 | "Grimsby Fairy Tale" | Denise Cassar | 16 September 2021 |
Anna wants to be the role of a princess of the annual community play but is cast as a witch along with Dave and Gran.
| 59 | "Spuds Railway" | Ciaran Murtagh and Andrew Barnett Jones | 17 September 2021 |
The Spuds buy a train set for the twins; this train is special as it is big enough to fit every member of the Spud family.
| 60 | "Be More Unicorn" | Isabel Fay | 17 September 2021 |
Dave orders a new water pistol but instead he is given a Happy Sparkle unicorn toy.
| 61 | "Grim Fest" | Dave Ingham | 20 September 2021 |
It's the Spuds' turn to run the Annual Grim Fest but their neighbours are planning to ruin their efforts.
| 62 | "Old Dave" | Tim Bain | 20 September 2021 |
Sick of following his parents' rules, Dave creates a reverse Fountain of Youth in the bath to become older.
| 63 | "An Honest Face" | Ciaran Murtagh and Andrew Barnett Jones | 21 September 2021 |
Dave gets framed for stealing sweeties and must find a way to prove he's not guilty.
| 64 | "Little Fluffy Cloud" | Madeleine Brettingham | 21 September 2021 |
Dave and Anna try to nurse a cloud back to health.
| 65 | "Spud Island" | Alison Gentleman | 22 September 2021 |
Grimsby Heights' lift takes the Spuds to a desert island.
| 66 | "Trucking American Dreams" | Edward Foster | 22 September 2021 |
Betty takes her family to America for her business trip.
| 67 | "Down on the Farm" | Hannah George | 3 December 2021 |
When the Spuds visit Betty's Sister, Barbara on her farm, Dave goes on an egg-citing adventure involving magic beans!
| 68 | "Beware the Overpants" | Matt Baker | 3 December 2021 |
Dave's lazy day of doing nothing is ruined when the town sees an uprising of their pants.
| 69 | "Moby Duck" | Dave Ingham | 6 December 2021 |
Dave gets sucked down the plughole in the bath and ends up adrift in a watery world, one that is full of lost bath time creatures.
| 70 | "Apple Pip" | Isabel Fay | 6 December 2021 |
Dave swallows an apple pip and turns into a tree - with the help of an oak tree called Linda, he discovers the importance of looking after nature.
| 71 | "Twinfestation" | Madeleine Brettingham | 7 December 2021 |
Following an incident with the school photocopier, Dave must round up a horde of photocopied baby Spud twins.
| 72 | "Treasure Hunt" | Alison Gentleman | 7 December 2021 |
Dave uses a magnet to search for treasure but ends up attracting all of the town's metal - and not just the small stuff.
| 73 | "Night School" | Ben Ward | 8 December 2021 |
Dave and his friends are locked in school overnight, but they find that they are not alone.
| 74 | "Duvet Day" | Isabel Fay | 8 December 2021 |
The Spuds show off Betty and George's new bed by taking it for a spin around the town, picking up a few unexpected passengers along the way.
| 75 | "Look Into Our Eyes" | Kirsty Peart and Jess Kedward | 9 December 2021 |
The people of Grimsby believe that the Twins are wise lifestyle gurus who are able to predict what everyone wants before they know it themselves.
| 76 | "The Stowaways" | Hannah George | 9 December 2021 |
Dave and his friends are given a lesson in responsibility when their school assigns them an animal each to look after overnight.
| 77 | "Green Eyed Monster" | Denise Cassar | 10 December 2021 |
Li'l Sue turns into a stomping green-eyed monster, and it is up to Dave and her other friends to calm her down before she ends up that way forever.
| 78 | "The Flipside" | Edward Foster | 10 December 2021 |
According to Gareth the starfish, every pancake has two sides, happy and grumpy - if Dave leaves his pancake on the grumpy side, an adventure awaits.

=== Shorts (2022) ===
"Where Do All the Boats Go?" - a short commissioned for The Festival of the Sea at Heritage Square Alexandra Dock in Grimsby on July 16, 2022.

=== Series 3 (2023–24) ===
| No. | Title | Written by | Original release date |
|---|---|---|---|
| 79 | "Olden Days" | Edward Foster | 17 July 2023 |
A faulty television remote rewinds the Spuds back to the olden days where everything is black and white, everyone is a puppet, and there is a giant biscuit on the rampage....
| 80 | "Ski Trip" | Edward Foster | 17 July 2023 |
The Spuds find themselves back in the Flipside and must use their superpowers to stop their mischievous pancake from ruining a school ski trip
| 81 | "Get Knitted" | Hannah George | 18 July 2023 |
It is the hottest day of the year and Gran's naughty knitting crew have dressed the whole town in their woolly wares - when their finest work, a giant sock puppet, comes to life, Dave must stop it from eating them all.
| 82 | "Lawnmower Land" | James Moran | 19 July 2023 |
George takes Anna and Dave on a trip to a local attraction called Lawnmower Land, but a run-in with the latest technology in lawnmowing gives them more than they baaaa-gained for...
| 83 | "Gorgeous George" | David Ingham | 20 July 2023 |
George shaves off his beard in a mistaken attempt to impress Betty, but the beard then runs away and it is up to Dave to coax it back for the sake of his family.
| 84 | "Moonbreaker" | Madeleine Brettingham | 21 July 2023 |
The Spuds set off the Bobby Dazzler firework that Gran has been saving, but when it hits the moon and breaks it into several pieces, the whole town goes wonky and Dave must somehow put the broken bits back together. Note: This was the last episode and the last programme to ever air on the CITV channel on 1st September 2023, before the channel closed and the show’s run moved to ITVX.
| 85 | "Robo-betty" | Madeleine Brettingham | 8 February 2024 |
George creates a robot version of Betty while she is away, but when the real Betty returns, Robo-Betty is not quite ready to give up her place in the Spud family
| 86 | "Mind the Gap" | Ciaran Murtagh and Andrew Barnett Jones | 8 February 2024 |
Dave finds out what really happens when you step on a gap in the pavement.
| 87 | "The Deep End" | Mariama Ives-Moiba | 8 February 2024 |
Dave has to contend with a living, singing blob on his head after using too much hair gel, and Anna faces her fear when confronted with the floating 'Lurgisaurus plaster' during her school swimming lesson.
| 88 | "Dave, Dave and Dave" | Myles McLeod | 8 February 2024 |
Dave uses Gran's 'Chaos Toilet' to go back in time and stop a noisy 'Spellybot' toy from ruining his homework in the present.
| 89 | "Warbling Weeds from Space" | James Moran | 8 February 2024 |
A meteor shower delivers an alien life form to Grimsby, and there are some very flowery, musical side effects for all who encounter them.
| 90 | "The New Kid" | Dave Ingham | 8 February 2024 |
It's the day that Dave gets to know the new kid at school, Colin, who lives on a boat called the Jolly Coffin. It turns out that Colin has some very interesting habits. Dave is preparing to play the new haunted house game.
| 91 | "The Tooth Scary" | Andrew Barnett Jones and Ciaran Murtagh | 21 March 2024 |
After playing the new haunted house game, It turns out Dave has a wobbly tooth that is refusing to budge.
| 92 | "Stuck in the Mud" | Hannah George | 21 March 2024 |
The Spuds show off their competitive side when Dave and George take on Betty and Anna in The Tough Muddy Assault Course.
| 93 | "Fuzzypeg's DNA" | Madeleine Brettingham | 21 March 2024 |
Fuzzypeg has been exhibiting some odd night-time behaviour. Dave must find out why by going on a mission to discover more about his dog's surprising genetic makeup
| 94 | "The Roundabout" | Mariama Ives-Moiba | 21 March 2024 |
Dave, Gran and Anna embark on a road trip to avoid having to clean the flat. One wrong turning later and they end up in the Jurassic era, where some very large dinosaurs want a taste of Gran's custard cream biscuits
| 95 | "Spudstitute Teacher" | Andrew Barnett Jones and Ciaran Murtagh | 21 March 2024 |
The teachers are excited about something hidden behind the bookcase in their school staff room. Disguising himself to get in, Dave cannot believe his eyes when all is revealed.
| 96 | "Clawfish of Doom" | Myles McLeod | 21 March 2024 |
Gran's nuclear pickle sandwiches turn out to be really good fishing bait on the school sea trip, too good as they have attracted Tabitha who is a very big crustacean bully. Can Gareth stop her and save them all?
| 97 | "Hypnocat" | Madeleine Brettingham | 12 September 2024 |
A stray cat enters the Spud residence and with one look into its swirly eyes, the Spuds are hypnotised into behaving like cats. It's up to Dave to find out just what Hypnocat wants.
| 98 | "Chuffy Phone Home" | James Moran | 12 September 2024 |
Chuffy Peaches loves living in the Spuds' bathroom but is missing home. A quick phone call to her parents and the Spuds find themselves beamed up into space along with Chuffy, where they are all soon caught up in an explosive alien rivalry.
| 99 | "Donkeys & Dragons" | Beth B. Hughes | 12 September 2024 |
The Spuds have a fantastical gaming adventure with Robert Robot, and there is a very large, tasty pie for dinner at stake.
| 100 | "Cowboy Dave" | Hannah George | 12 September 2024 |
Aunty Barb and her animals have run away from the farm. Realising there is not enough room in the Spud flat for all of them, Dave uses his recently acquired cowboy skills to hunt down the large wriggly reason why Aunty Barb left in the first place
| 101 | "Baked Breakout" | Morgan Bailey | 12 September 2024 |
The Spuds dare to go shopping without Gran, but when she wakes to find them gone, she creates a new family of freshly baked Spud-Scones using some rather questionable, life-giving ingredients
| 102 | "No Place Like Home" | Mariama Ives-Moiba | 12 September 2024 |
Dave's wish for the wizard on television to grant him a 'dream home' leads to the Spuds' flat being taken away. Will Dave and his family accept any of the new homes offered to them or realise their old tower block, is really the best place to live?
| 103 | "The Great Spud Flood" | Andrew Barnett and JonesCiaran Murtagh | 12 September 2024 |
The Spuds wake to find all of Grimsby underwater following an accidental toss of the pancake. It is a race against time to toss it back from the Flipside and to pull the plug on the watery world they are now living in & the rooster stops Dave and Anna as from going to bed.
| 104 | "Uncle David" | Edward Foster | 12 September 2024 |
George and Betty have a romantic night away leaving Gran in charge. After throwing a party, Gran's clean-up operation leads Dave to discover a vacuum cleaner haunted by a long-lost member of the Spud family. Everyone from Grimsby is about to morn the loving memory of Spud family's beloved son.
