= Iain Gardner =

Scottish film director (born 1970)

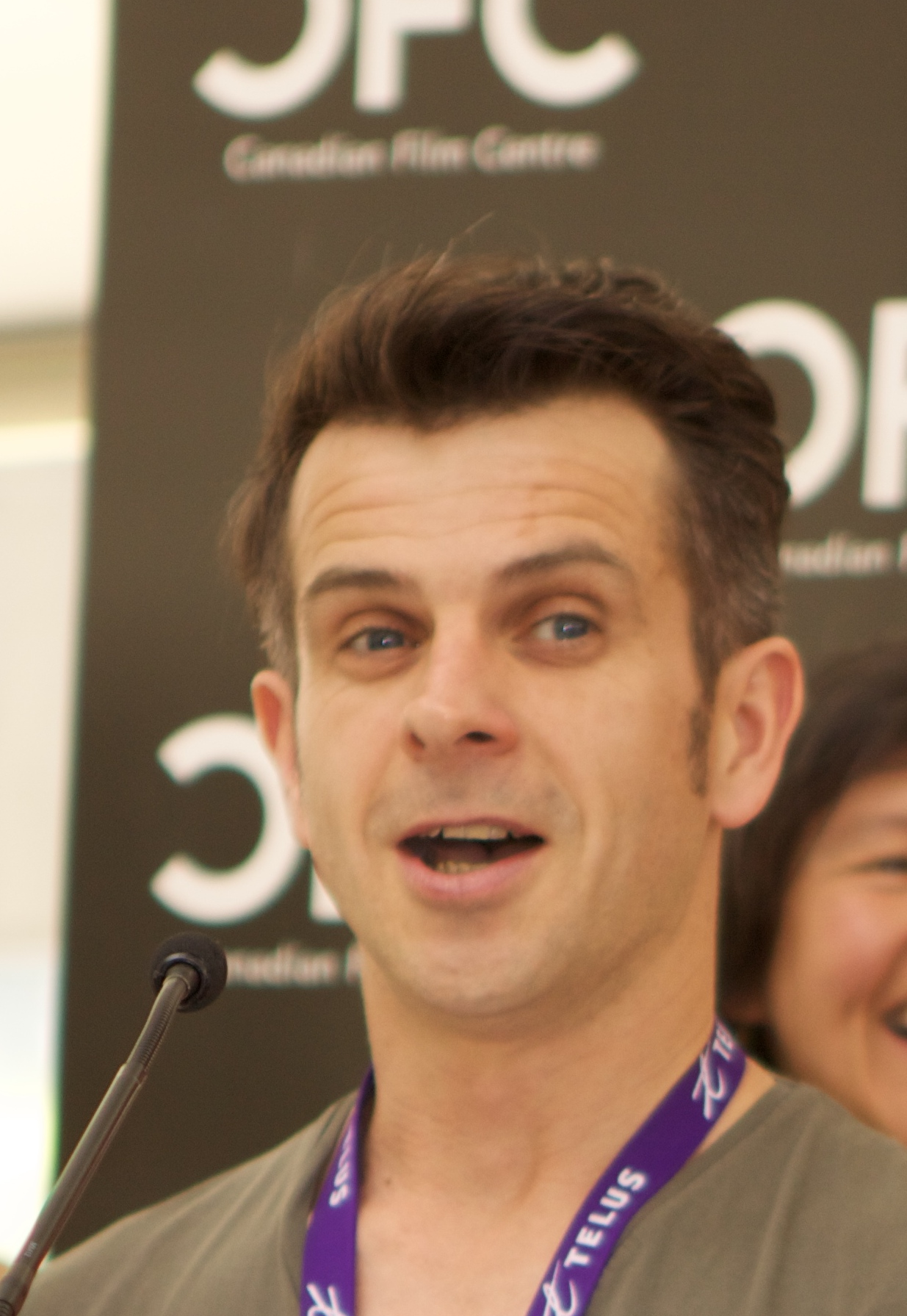
- Born: April 19, 1970 (age 55); Glasgow
- Citizenship: British
- Occupation: Film director
- Known for: A Bear Named Wojtek

Iain Alexander Gardner is a Scottish animator and director based in Edinburgh, Scotland. His notable works include the 2023 Scottish-Polish animated short film A Bear Named Wojtek (2023).

== Career ==
Gardner graduated in 1993 with a Bachelor's in Illustration from the Glasgow School of Art. During his undergraduate degree, he took a year out to work at the Richard Williams Studio on The Thief and The Cobbler. In 1996, he obtained a Master's degree in Animation from the Royal College of Art.

After graduating, Gardner worked at the John Coates TVCartoons studio and at Channel 4, as part of their MOMI Animation residency. Between 2001 and 2002, he lived in Canada and worked in the Animation and Illustration departments at Bruce Alcock's Global Mechanic on The Magical Life of Long Tack Sam (2003) directed by Ann Marie Fleming.

Between 2009 and 2019, Gardner worked as Animation Programmer at the Edinburgh International Film Festival, overseeing the McLaren Award for Best British Animation and curating retrospectives about renowned animators, including Don Hertzfeldt, Richard Williams, Lizzie Hobbs, Barry Purves, and Scottish filmmaking duo Will Anderson and Ainslie Henderson.

In 2013, Gardner founded the production company Animation Garden, which developed the series Mustard & Ketchup (later renamed as Badger Beats) and produced projects such as A Bear Named Wojtek (2023).

In 2014 , Gardner was the Artistic Director of McLaren2014 , a project in partnership with the National Film Board of Canada that celebrated the Centenary of animator Norman McLaren.

== Filmography ==
=== Film ===
- 1996: The Flight of the Dodo (short film) - director.
- 1999: Akbar's Cheetah (short film) - director.
- 2003: The Loch Ness Kelpie (short film) - director.
- 2009: Mary and The Miners (short film) - director.
- 2010: The Tannery (short film) - director, writer, animator.
- 2023: A Bear Named Wojtek (short film) - director, executive producer.

=== TV series ===
- 2000: The Canterbury Tales – The Squire's Tale (season 2, ep. 1) - director.

=== Other ===
- 2017: Looper: Farfisa Song (music video) - director.

== Recognition ==
Gardner's films have received several awards from international film festivals, including a Scottish BAFTA nomination for his film The Tannery (2010), as well as the 2024 British Animation Award for Best Long Form Film and the 2024 Venice TV Award for Best Animation with A Bear Named Wojtek (2023). The film was also a recipient of the BFI's YACF Production Award.

Gardner's work is mentioned in two books: Maureen Furniss's The Animation Bible (2008) and the 2nd edition of Paul Wells and Samantha Moore's The Fundamentals of Animation (2016).
