= British Animation Awards =

Biennial British animation awards

- Awarded for: Achievements in British animation
- Country: United Kingdom
- Presented by: British Animation Awards Limited
- First award: 1996
- Website: www.britishanimationawards.com

The British Animation Awards (BAAs) are biennial awards recognising achievements in British animation, including animated films, television programmes, commercials, music videos and student productions. The awards originated in 1988 and were reorganised in the 1990s, with the present biennial format established in 1996 by Jayne Pilling. They recognise both established and emerging animators, with winners selected through industry juries and public voting.

== History ==
The origins of the British Animation Awards have been traced to 1988, when the awards were inaugurated under the aegis of the Welsh broadcaster S4C. The awards were subsequently substantially reorganised, including changes to their jury composition and the introduction of audience participation in the selection of winners.

The present biennial format was established in 1996 by Jayne Pilling, who directed the awards until 2018. The first ceremony under this format was hosted by comedian Willie Rushton. It was held at the National Film Theatre in February 1996, when Nick Park's A Close Shave won four awards. The awards have been held every two years since 1996.

The 2002 awards marked an expansion in international participation, with animators from outside the United Kingdom invited to enter for the first time. That year's competition received more than 1,000 entries from Britain and overseas, from which 40 finalists were selected. Audiences participated in selecting winners through screenings at 17 cinemas across the United Kingdom. Pilling explained that the international expansion was intended to expose British filmmakers to developments in animation elsewhere in the world.

The ceremonies have generally been held at London's National Film Theatre, subsequently known as BFI Southbank, although the Shaw Theatre has also hosted the event. Presenters have included comedians Jeremy Hardy, Linda Smith, Joe Pasquale, Caroline Mabey, Thom Tuck, Aisling Bea and Miles Jupp. Hardy developed a longstanding association with the awards, presenting several ceremonies. Following his death in 2019, he was commemorated at the 2020 ceremony.

In 2018, Pilling announced her retirement as director, alongside producer Gulsen Yanik. She was succeeded by Helen Brunsdon. By that year, the awards had presented more than 240 prizes.

The 2020 ceremony took place on 12 March, shortly before the introduction of restrictions on public gatherings in response to the COVID-19 pandemic. The 2022 ceremony marked a return to the event following two years of social restrictions. The 2024 ceremony was held on 7 March at BFI Southbank. In October 2026 the organisers announced that the awards would return in 2028, after a hiatus, under Tracy Shaw and Anna Lord.

== Awards and selection ==
The awards recognise animation across various formats and production disciplines. Categories have included short films, feature films, children's and pre-school television series, commercials, music videos, student productions, writing, sound, design and voice performance. International categories have also been presented. In 2002, these included Best European Animated Feature and the International Short Film Award.

The categories have changed over time. In 2020, the organisers introduced the Lamb Award, recognising emerging professionals in the animation industry. Its inaugural recipient was Roxy Linklater, a rigger at Aardman Animations.

The 2024 awards comprised 23 categories, including separate awards for undergraduate and postgraduate films, an Audience Award, a Children's Choice Award and an Outstanding Contribution Award. The competition rules defined a British production in terms of UK-based creative and entrepreneurial activity, a UK-resident director or producer, and a UK-registered production company. The rules specified a pre-selection and final jury process for most categories, with separate selection arrangements for the Audience Award, Children's Choice Award and Outstanding Contribution Award.

=== Prizes ===
Rather than conventional trophies, the British Animation Awards have traditionally presented original artworks featuring sheep, a visual reference to the sound of the abbreviation "BAA". The works are specially created for the awards by animators and other artists from Britain and abroad. The first prizes, in 1996, were drawings by animators including Chuck Jones, Tim Burton and Nick Park. Nick Bradshaw wrote in Sight and Sound in 2010 that "few honours are thought to rank higher than the presentation from one's peers of a picture of a sheep". In 2024 the prizes were a numbered series of linocut prints by Derek Hayes.

=== Public voting and screenings ===
Public participation has formed part of the awards since their early editions. Public Choice awards were determined through screenings at cinemas and other venues around the United Kingdom. In 2000, participating venues included the Watershed in Bristol and Chapter Cinema in Cardiff. The awards were supported by Time Out and Channel 4, which also supported a tour of the winning films.

The winning productions were screened both nationally and internationally. In 2000, animation journalist Andrew Osmond reported that screenings of the 1998 winners at nine venues in Belgium had resulted in offers from Belgian television broadcasters to purchase three of the films. Public Choice voting was subsequently conducted online, including during the 2022 awards, when three prizes were determined by public voting.

== Selected winners ==
- 1998: Ruth Lingford won Best Film Over 10 Minutes for Death and the Mother.
- 2000: Joanna Quinn received the Craft Award for The Wife of Bath's Tale, while Robbie the Reindeer: Hooves of Fire won three awards, including Best TV Special and Children's Choice.
- 2002: Suzie Templeton won Best Student Film for Dog. Michael Dudok de Wit received three awards for Father and Daughter, including Best Short Film.
- 2006: Run Wrake won Best Short Film and Best Film at the Cutting Edge for Rabbit. Directors Smith & Foulkes won Best Commercial: Direction for the Honda: Grrr advertisement.
- 2008: Aardman Animations won four awards, including Best Children's Series and Children's Choice for Shaun the Sheep.
- 2020: A Shaun the Sheep Movie: Farmageddon won Best Long Form Animation, while Moominvalley won Best Children's Series.
- 2022: Affairs of the Art won three awards, including Best Short Film, while Robin Robin won Best Original Music.

== Reception and significance ==
In a 2007 review of the British Animation Awards' six-disc DVD anthology, animation scholar Paul Wells examined the awards' role in the development and recognition of British animation. Placing their emergence in the context of changing support for animation from Channel 4, Wells argued that the BAAs had become an important focal point for the industry, serving both as a showcase for animation across different production sectors and as an occasion for the animation community to recognise its achievements. He particularly emphasised the awards' recognition of a wide range of practitioners, including students, independent artists, commercial animators and established studios.

Wells interpreted the awards' distinctive prizes as expressions of mutual recognition and respect within the British animation community. Reviewing the films collected on the awards' DVDs, he argued that they demonstrated the variety and innovation of contemporary British animation, particularly its engagement with adult audiences and subjects beyond conventional children's entertainment.

The Independent called the awards "Britain's Oscars of animation industry" in 2004, though it described the lack of a feature-film prize that year as "an eccentric decision by the awards' founder". In 1998 a critic in The Times, noting that Stressed Eric had won two prizes before it was broadcast, wondered whether "it was those awards that gave the BBC the courage" to give the series a prime-time slot.

In 2024, the industry organisation Animation UK described the awards as prestigious.
