= Little Princess (British TV series) =

British animated children's television series

- Genre: Adventure
- Opening theme: "Little Princess"
- Ending theme: "Little Princess" (Instrumental)
- Composer: Bradley Miles
- Country of origin: United Kingdom
- Original language: English
- No. of series: 4
- No. of episodes: 135

Production
- Executive producer: Lee Mariott
- Producer: Iain Harvey
- Editor: Richard Overall
- Running time: 11 minutes
- Production company: The Illuminated Film Company

Original release
- Network: Channel 5 Milkshake! S4C
- Release: 9 October 2006 – 6 April 2020

Little Princess is a British animated children's television series created by The Illuminated Film Company. It was directed by Edward Foster during series 1–3 and directed by Sue Tong during series 4. It premiered in the United Kingdom in 2006. The programme is shown in the UK as part of Channel 5's Milkshake! and as Y Dywysoges Fach in the children's programming strand Cyw on the Welsh language channel S4C.

The stories in series 1–3 are narrated by Julian Clary, who also provides the voice of the cat character Puss. Series 4 is narrated by Rufus Jones. Jane Horrocks provides the voice of the Little Princess. The series is based on the original books by Tony Ross and follows the success of Ross's 1986 book 'I Want My Potty', which was also turned into a five-minute short film for Anytime Tales.

== Premise ==
The show tells the story of a very spoiled princess, who is curious about the world around her and can be really bossy at times. She wears a white dress and a yellow crown. She communicates with the narrator in every episode. It is unknown what her real name is, but her parents sometimes call her "Poppit". She is joined by her parents, the King and Queen, and pets, Puss the Cat and Scruff the Dalmatian. Other characters who live in the castle include the Maid, the Admiral, the Chef, the Gardener, the General and the Prime Minister.

== Characters ==
- Narrator (voiced by Julian Clary and Rufus Jones)
- Little Princess (voiced by Jane Horrocks)
- Queen (voiced by Maggie Ollerenshaw)
- Maid (voiced by Victoria Willing)
- King/Admiral (voiced by Edward Peel)
- Chef/Gardener/General/Prime Minister (voiced by Colin McFarlane)
- Great Uncle Walter (voiced by Brian Blessed)
- Algie (voiced by Shelley Longworth)
- Professor (voiced by Robert Webb)

=== Additional Voices ===
- Darren Boyd
- Keith Wickham
- David Holt
- Maria Darling
- Dustin Demri-Burns
- Terry Mynott
- Rob Rackstraw
- Vincenzo Nicoli
- Tom Stourton
- Lewis MacLeod
- Steven Kynman
- Tim Whitnall
- Miriam Margolyes

== Development ==
In March 2006, German-based animation firm TV-Loonland AG acquired worldwide distribution rights for the series.

== Episodes ==
=== Series 1 (2006–07) ===
No. overall	No. in series	Title	Original release date
1	1	"I Want My Tooth"	9 October 2006
One of the Little Princess's lovely white teeth falls out just before a family photograph!
2	2	"I Don't Want Help"	10 October 2006
Little Princess is unhappy that she's never allowed to dress herself, wipe her nose or even cut up her own food. Deciding she does not need anymore help the Princess quickly discovers that some things really do require a little bit of assistance…
3	3	"I Don't Want to Go to Bed"	11 October 2006
Little Princess does not want to go to bed. It's not fair as everyone else is wide awake! It also doesn't help that Gilbert has spotted monsters under her bed. Now she'll have to find an alternative arrangement…
4	4	"I Don't Know What to Be"	12 October 2006
Little Princess can not decide what she wants to be when she grows up.
5	5	"I Want to Whistle"	13 October 2006
Little Princess discovers that everyone in the kingdom can whistle except her.
6	6	"I Want My Dummy"	16 October 2006
The Princess does not want to give up her dummy and wonders why it keeps disappearing.
7	7	"I Can't Remember"	17 October 2006
When Little Princess loses things that her friends have lent her, she sets out to try and remember just what she did with them.
8	8	"I Don't Want a Bath"	18 October 2006
Little Princess does not like baths and she will do anything to avoid them…
9	9	"I Didn't Do It"	19 October 2006
When Little Princess gets into trouble, she just does not know whether to own up or let poor old Scruff take the blame.
10	10	"I Don't Want to Comb My Hair"	20 October 2006
The Princess decides not to brush her hair, and discovers combing other people's is more fun.
11	11	"I Don't Like Salad"	5 March 2007
The Little Princess grows a tomato plant of her own, and discovers how fun tomatoes can be.
12	12	"I Want to do Magic"	6 March 2007
Little Princess performs some magic tricks, but soon discovers that the magic works a little too well.
13	13	"I Don't Want to Tidy Up"	7 March 2007
Little Princess is fed up with having to tidy away her toys. The King and Queen agree she can leave her room messy if she wants, but as the clutter builds, her teddy bear Gilbert goes missing.
14	14	"I Want a Trumpet"	8 March 2007
A music box entrances everyone at the castle, not least the Little Princess, who decides to learn how to play a musical instrument herself.
15	15	"I Don't Want to Share"	9 March 2007
The Little Princess is given a new paddling pool to splash about in, but soon finds that playing alone is no substitute for sharing with friends.
16	16	"I Don't Like Worms"	12 March 2007
The Little Princess's fun and games in the mud come to an abrupt end when she encounters a worm.
17	17	"I Want My Voice Back"	13 March 2007
The Little Princess has lost her voice, and has to find alternative ways to communicate. Soon, everyone else wants her voice to return.
18	18	"What's Wrong with Gilbert?"	14 March 2007
The Little Princess is distraught when her teddy bear Gilbert's leg falls off. After he is repaired, the Little Princess is worried about playing with him again.
19	19	"I Want a Tent"	15 March 2007
The Little Princess aims to construct a tent, but unforeseen happenings require her to double her efforts.
20	20	"I Want to Win"	16 March 2007
It is the castle's annual pet talent contest, and Little Princess is determined to win the golden rosette. Puss is the only pet left, and Princess is unsure that he has what it takes to win. Will Puss prove himself to Princess with a special talent?
21	21	"I Don't Want a Cold"	2 April 2007
The Little Princess has a cold, she's not happy about it and a chance to go for a swim in the pond is put on hold. She's not about to let it spoil her fun though when she can just bend the rules.
22	22	"Maid's Day Off?"	3 April 2007
Little Princess takes over the Maid's job but she finds it hard.
23	23	"Can I Keep It?"	4 April 2007
Little Princess discovers a tadpole in her glass of water but it turns into a frog.
24	24	"I Want to Cook"	5 April 2007
It is the General's birthday, and Little Princess decides to bake him a cake. Will the castle kitchen be big enough for two chefs?
25	25	"I Don't Like Autumn"	6 April 2007
When the leaves start falling and reveal the Little Princess's summer hidey-hole, she decides to stop autumn.
26	26	"I Don't Want Nits"	9 July 2007
Little Princess is unhappy when she discovers she has nits and the rest of the household is trying to avoid her.
27	27	"I Want My New Shoes"	10 July 2007
Little Princess gets a lovely pair of new, sparkly shoes and really does not want to take them off!
28	28	"I Want My Snail"	11 July 2007
Little Princess finds a snail and names him Speedy. When she accidentally steps on him, Little Princess is distraught and decides to give her deceased friend a proper funeral so she and the rest of the household can say goodbye…
29	29	"But They're Mine…"	12 July 2007
Little Princess cannot fit into her favourite clothes any more. But that does not mean she's ready to give them up just yet.
30	30	"I Want My Sledge"	13 July 2007
Little Princess really wants a shiny new sledge to play with, but when she gets one, she begins to see the advantages of her old, little sledge.

=== Series 2 (2007–08) ===
No. overall	No. in series	Title	Original release date
31	1	"I Want a Shop"	2 August 2007
Little Princess decides to set up her own shop. She searches the castle, finding all sorts of interesting things to sell, and soon has lots of happy customers. But it is not long before everyone realises they've bought things that belong to someone else.
32	2	"It's Sports Day!"	3 August 2007
It's sports day at the castle and the atmosphere is electric! The household all pick teams but when the Princess ends up with Scruff and the Admiral she is less than happy. She'll never win with that team! She's just going to have to do all the races herself.
33	3	"I Want to be a Pirate"	4 August 2007
Little Princess decides to be a pirate. Much to her delight she discovers that they are very naughty people! Pirates do not have to wash or do as they're told! It's the sailor's life for the Princess. Or it is until she finds out that even the naughtiest pirates have chores to do.
34	4	"I Want to Go to the Fair"	5 August 2007
In her excitement to go to the fair the Little Princess hurts her foot and has to stay at home with the Queen whilst everyone else goes. The Little Princess is upset but the Queen has a few ideas to make her daughter feel better.
35	5	"I Want to Dress Up"	6 August 2007
There's a fancy dress party at the castle and a prise for the best costume! Little Princess is determined to have the best outfit for the occasion but all of her costume ideas seem to go horribly wrong. Just what will she go as?
36	6	"I Want a Surprise"	9 August 2007
It's the Little Princess's birthday and she cannot wait to find out what her surprise present will be! In fact, she's so desperate to find out that she sets off in search of it. Pretty soon she's uncovered all of her birthday surprises and when the big day finally arrives it just does not feel that special.
37	7	"I Want a Bicycle"	10 August 2007
Little Princess is fed up of her tricycle not going fast enough. What she needs is a bicycle! One with just two wheels! But just getting on the bicycle, let alone staying on it proves more of a challenge than the Princess bargained for.
38	8	"I Don't Want to Leave Home"	11 August 2007
When Little Princess overhears her parents discussing her, she thinks they are going to send her away! She tries hiding and saying she does not want to go but nothing seems to work. When the deadline finally arrives, the Princess discovers she might have got her wires a little bit crossed.
39	9	"I Want a Best Friend"	12 August 2007
Everyone in the royal castle seems to have a best friend. Everyone, that is, except the Little Princess. When her baby cousin comes to visit she decides he'll be perfect for the job. But sometimes best friends do not always do what they're supposed to.
40	10	"I Don't Want to Kiss Great Aunty"	13 August 2007
Great Aunty is coming to visit and Little Princess is not happy. Great Aunty has got borrowed teeth, baggy tights and a scritchy scratchy chin, and worst of all, the Princess is going to have to give her a kiss!! How will she get out of this one?
41	11	"I Want a Midnight Feast"	16 August 2007
Little Princess is going to have a midnight feast! She creeps around the castle gathering up goodies to eat but there's one big problem - she just can not seem to stay awake long enough. After a few failed attempts, it's the General who finally comes up with a plan to make sure they're awake for midnight.
42	12	"I Want to be Good"	17 August 2007
Little Princess really wants to help decorate the Christmas tree, but she has to maintain her good behaviour all day in order to do so.
43	13	"I Want My Crayons"	18 August 2007
Little Princess has a lovely shiny new box of crayons. They look so clean and new that she does not want to actually use them. But when the precious crayons start mysteriously disappearing from their box, the Princess starts accusing members of the royal household.
44	14	"I Want to be Tall"	19 August 2007
Little Princess is just not tall enough! She cannot reach the things she wants. So the only solution is to grow. She sets about doing all the things that will make her bigger - none of which seem to do the trick. But when her baby cousin comes to visit she realises that maybe she's not that small after all.
45	15	"I Want My Plaster"	20 August 2007
Little Princess is very proud of her new plaster which she got for hurting her knee. And when the General hurts his leg, she shows him how to be brave like she was. Unfortunately, when it comes time to 'rip' the plaster off, the Princess's bravery seems to have vanished.
46	16	"I Want a Swing"	3 January 2008
Little Princess has got a brand new swing! The only drawback is that she's not allowed on it without an adult around. But the Princess cannot quite stop herself from having just a little go…and when she falls off, she's so scared, she spends the rest of the day finding reasons not to play on it.
47	17	"I Want to be a Baby"	4 January 2008
When Little Princess's baby cousin comes to stay she cannot understand why he gets all the attention from the grown ups. How come when she's messy and noisy she gets told off but when he does it they all think he's sweet? Perhaps the Princess should try being a baby too.
48	18	"I Want to be a Cavegirl"	5 January 2008
Little Princess decides to become a cavegirl and live in a cave (well, the garden shed). Not only does she get to do cavegirl dancing and go hunting for sabertooth tigers, but cavegirls do not have to behave either! But when it gets dark, living in a cave loses some of its appeal…Is that a hairy elephant she can hear?!
49	19	"I Want My Puppets"	6 January 2008
Little Princess is putting on a puppet show for her friends. Unbeknownst to her, as she goes about making the tickets and the refreshments, her puppets get more and more tangled...It's only as the curtain is about to raise that she sees what a state they're in! But as they say…the show must go on.
50	20	"Mother's Day!"	7 January 2008
It's Mother's Day and Little Princess is making her Mum a very special present. She's just not sure what it is though because it keeps changing! The Queen is very excited about Mother's Day and is soon hot on the trail of her daughter and the mysterious present.
51	21	"I Want to be an Explorer"	10 January 2008
When Little Princess learns about her Great Grandfather the explorer, and how he found the Blue Boogaloo Land and the rare Red Wibbler, she decides she's going to become an explorer too! But does Blue Boogaloo Land really exist? And if it does, will the Princess be able to find it?
52	22	"I Want to Collect"	11 January 2008
When Little Princess discovers that everyone else in the castle has a collection of some sort, she decides she needs one too! She sets about collecting all sorts of different things but it soon becomes clear that it's actually a little trickier than she thought.
53	23	"I Want to be Queen"	12 January 2008
Little Princess cannot understand why her Mum gets breakfast in bed and eats truffles all day. The Princess is not allowed to do that! So they decide to swap roles for the day and it soon becomes clear that being Queen maybe is not that easy after all.
54	24	"I Want to Play Football"	13 January 2008
There's a storm raging outside and the Little Princess is stuck inside the castle and bored. She's played all her games twice over. When she discovers her football she thinks she's hit on the perfect game, but pretty soon realises that footballs are not best played with indoors.
55	25	"I Want to Play in the Rain"	14 January 2008
Little Princess loves rainy days - there are so many puddles to splash in! But no one else in the castle wants to play with her - they want to stay indoors and dry. 'Indoors is boring' sings the Princess. But when things start going wrong for her she decides that perhaps they might be right?
56	26	"I Want Baked Beans"	13 August 2008
When Little Princess discovers that she likes baked beans, she decides she wants to eat them all the time, much to the Household's dismay. But after a whilst, and one bean too many, they start to lose their appeal. Even more so when she realises that she might be turning into one!
57	27	"I Don't Want to Dance"	14 August 2008
Little Princess does not want to go to her dance class - they make her dance like a butterfly! They're flappy and floaty - and she is not! So she sets about hiding from the Maid but on her way discovers that there is more to dancing than being a butterfly.
58	28	"I Want to Go on Holiday"	15 August 2008
When Little Princess receives a postcard from Great Aunty, she decides that she'd like to go on holiday too. Trouble is, the rest of the Household are busy with the spring cleaning, so the Princess has to go alone. But holidays just are not all that much fun if you've got no one else to play with.
59	29	"I Want My Sheep"	16 August 2008
Little Princess is playing vet and gets quite a shock when she comes across a real sheep on the castle grounds! After a while she and Sheepy become inseparable and when the Gardener arrives to take Sheepy home, the Princess decides she really does not want him to leave.
60	30	"I Don't Want to Miss It"	17 August 2008
Little Princess keeps missing all the fun and exciting things that happen around the castle. She always gets there too late! So she decides to get her friends to call her when something exciting happens but soon discovers that sometimes you just have to be in the right place at the right time.
61	31	"I Want to do a Show"	9 September 2008
Great Aunty is coming to visit and Little Princess decides to put on a show! Everyone in the household gets a trick to perform, but when rehearsals start, it soon becomes clear that the Princess has a lot of work to do before the big performance.
62	32	"Can I Have It Back Now, Please?"	10 September 2008
When Little Princess's Baby Cousin comes to visit, she decides to be very kind and lend him Gilbert for the day. But to her horror, everyone thinks that she's given Gilbert to him for good. What will she do without her favourite teddy bear?
63	33	"I Want to Find the Treasure"	11 September 2008
It's Treasure Hunt day at the castle and everyone is very excited! Little Princess did not find any of the chocolate eggs last year so this year she's determined. So much so that when she discovers a map of their hiding places, she decides it would not really be cheating to use it…Would it?!
64	34	"I Don't Like Thunderstorms"	12 September 2008
Little Princess is playing superheroes and she's not scared of anything! Anything, that is, except thunderstorms. When a massive storm hits the castle, she races indoors to hide. But soon she realises that Scruff is stuck out in the storm, and someone is going to have to rescue him.
65	35	"I Can Keep a Secret"	13 September 2008
The General has got a secret and no one in the castle knows it except The Princess. She's got to do her utmost to keep it secret from the rest of the household, which is not an easy task.

=== Specials (2007–09) ===
No. overall	No. in series	Title	Original release date
1	1	"Harvest Festival"	5 October 2007
2	2	"A Merry Little Christmas"	25 December 2009

=== Series 3 (2009–10) ===
No. overall	No. in series	Title	Original release date
66	1	"I Want My Horace"	3 February 2009
Great Uncle Walter's Shetland pony comes to stay.
67	2	"I Want My Treehouse"	4 February 2009
Princess competes with Algie and Maid to see who can build the best tree house.
68	3	"I Don't Like Arguments"	5 February 2009
Princess tries to paint but General and Maid are having a loud argument next door. - can she help them to be friends again?
69	4	"I Want to Ice Skate"	6 February 2009
When the pond freezes over, Princess brags about how good she is at ice skating. Was she telling the truth?
70	5	"I Want to Cut Out"	7 February 2009
Princess ruins her new dress after she plays with the scissors and glue. Will she manage to fix it before anyone notices?
71	6	"I Want to Go to Space"	10 February 2009
Princess wants to go to space and explore but soon realises that there is plenty to explore in the castle.
72	7	"I Want to be a Bridesmaid"	11 February 2009
Princess finds the perfect dress and wedding cake to wear to be a bridesmaid but finding someone to marry is not quite so simple…
73	8	"I Want to be a Detective"	12 February 2009
After someone eats all of the cookies belonging to Princess, she sets some traps to work out who it is
74	9	"I Want Scruff"	13 February 2009
Algie visits the castle and teaches Scruff some tricks. Does he prefer Algie to Princess? When Algie climbs up the tree to free a frizz bee, something falls out his pocket and all is discovered.
75	10	"I Want to Go to the Seaside"	14 February 2009
The castle people takes a trip to the beach, but it's empty and worse still, it has started to rain.
76	11	"I'm Going to Win the Rosette"	16 March 2009
Princess is desperate to win a golden rosette at the castle's pet annual talent contest.
77	12	"I Want to Sing"	17 March 2009
Princess is determined to win a singing competition but cannot come up with a perfect idea of a song to perform.
78	13	"I Want to be a Vet"	18 March 2009
Princess wants to be a vet but looking after animals are harder work than she expected.
79	14	"I Want to Play a Joke"	19 March 2009
Algie keeps on playing tricks on Princess so she decides to be given her own back.
80	15	"Please Don't Go"	20 March 2009
A flock of geese mess up Admiral's pond so he sadly decides to leave the castle to find a new pond.
81	16	"I Want a Gymkhana"	23 March 2009
When the General prepares a gymkhana at the castle, Princess and Horace make a great team.
82	17	"I'll Make You Strong"	24 March 2009
Princess helps General become strong to impress Maid.
83	18	"I Don't Want to Play the Piano"	25 March 2009
When Auntie brings a piano to the castle, Princess decides to have a go on it. But she learns that playing it takes a lot of practice.
84	19	"Who Turned Off the Lights?"	26 March 2009
Princess, her family, and friends are just preparing a birthday party for Great Uncle Walter when suddenly the electricity goes out. As nothing is working, they decide the party must be cancelled.
85	20	"I Want My Duck"	27 March 2009
Scruff finds three duck eggs which hatch and Princess cannot find their mother so has to look after them herself.
86	21	"I Want to Be a Policeman"	15 February 2010
Princess does not like being given rules so decides to become a policeman to give her family and friends the same rules she's given.
87	22	"I Want to Be a Nurse"	16 February 2010
When Princess plays nurses, Maid feels poorly so the nurse has to help her patient feel better.
88	23	"I Want Your Tiara"	17 February 2010
When Scruff finds a lost tiara, Princess decides to keep it until she finds it belonging to Maid.
89	24	"I Want to Be Famous"	18 February 2010
Princess wants to become famous just like her Great Uncle Walter because he's been given a statue and decides that she needs one too.
90	25	"I Want a New Bedroom"	19 February 2010
After Princess finds her parents bedroom redecorated she decides to redecorate her bedroom too. But choosing the right colour of pattern is hard.
91	26	"I Want to Skate"	22 February 2010
Princess keeps falling over when skating and has not learnt to skate yet. But she keeps trying her best to skate.
92	27	"I Want My Stick Insect"	23 February 2010
Princess looks after Great Uncle Walter's stick bug. But when it keeps on getting lost, it's hard to see what it looks like when finding it.
93	28	"I Want to Play Hide and Seek"	24 February 2010
When Prime Minister, Admiral, General, and Princess play hide and seek, she never wins the game until she finds a secret room to hide in the castle. But soon everyone knows about her secret room.
94	29	"I Want a Sleepover"	25 February 2010
Algie and Princess have a sleepover when she's too excited to go to bed when she thinks that there might be dragons in the castle.
95	30	"I Mustn't Be Bossy"	26 February 2010
Princess and Algie open their cafes when they discover that organisation is hard work and Algie does not like being told what to do.
96	31	"I Want to Go Camping"	19 June 2010
When everyone including Great Uncle Walter is locked out of their castles, the only place they can sleep in is in the tent outside.
97	32	"I Want a Pen Pal"	20 June 2010
Princess wants to receive a letter in the post so decides that she needs a pen pal.
98	33	"I Want My Robin"	21 June 2010
Princess is bird-watching but it is so hard to look at them when they fly off.
99	34	"I Want to Recycle"	22 June 2010
When the ice cream and drawing paper run out, Princess realises that is not good to waste things so she finds new ways to recycle old rubbish.
100	35	"I Want a Go Kart"	23 June 2010
Princess and Great Uncle Walter team up for the go-kart race.

=== Series 4 (2018–20) ===
No. overall	No. in series	Title	Original release date
101	1	"Gilbot"	14 May 2018
Professor builds Princess a robot, which becomes her new favourite toy, but she soon comes to realise there are some things a robot cannot do that a teddy can.
102	2	"Surprise"	15 May 2018
Little Princess is intrigued when a big box arrives at the castle.
103	3	"Rainbow"	16 May 2018
Little Princess is delighted when a rainbow appears over the castle and she is determined to see if there is gold at the end of it.
104	4	"Picture Perfect Princess"	17 May 2018
The young royal is making a gift for a special day at the castle but someone keeps decorating it whilst she sleeps.
105	5	"Teacher"	18 May 2018
The Little Princess decides that she would make a very good teacher.
106	6	"Sister"	10 June 2019
The youngster becomes determined to find a sister after seeing the Queen and Aunty having a lovely sisterly time together.
107	7	"Little Princess Says"	11 June 2019
Professor causes a stir after introducing Pandora, a voice-activated device, to the castle, but Princess does not take too kindly to the new arrival.
108	8	"Little Princess Lends a Hand"	12 June 2019
Princess tries to be helpful when Chef was tripped over a potato and broke his foot. The Professor replace him with a robot chef, but then it goes wrong.
109	9	"Watch the Birdie"	13 June 2019
The youngster soon discovers that looking after Claptrap the parrot is not as easy as she first thought.
110	10	"Safari"	14 June 2019
After viewing photographs taken by King and Queen whilst they were on safari, the youngster decides to go on safari herself.
111	11	"SeeSaw"	21 October 2019
Princess is not happy when everyone is too busy to keep their promise to help her build a seesaw.
112	12	"Down Under Up Over"	22 October 2019
Princess is thrilled when Algie comes to stay, but he is missing something from home…
113	13	"Medal"	23 October 2019
Princess learns that to earn a medal in the castle, one has to do something very brave.
114	14	"Doll's House"	24 October 2019
Princess and Gilbert set out to earn a doll's house by doing good deeds around the castle.
115	15	"Cowgirl"	25 October 2019
Princess decides to become a cowgirl like Tilly the Kid in her favourite series of books.
116	16	"Fish"	28 October 2019
Princess helps the royal household's new pet, a little fish called Fishface, settle in.
117	17	"I'll Try to be Quiet"	29 October 2019
It's everyone's day off and they are enjoying the peace and quiet. Can Princess keep the noise down too?
118	18	"Turn on the Taps"	30 October 2019
Great Aunty introduces Princess to tap dancing, but Princess does not want to have lessons…
119	19	"I Want My Tree"	31 October 2019
Princess's favourite tree has fallen over in a storm and now must be chopped down. How can she save it?
120	20	"Little Princess and the Sunflower"	1 November 2019
Princess wants to climb a sunflower just like Jack did with his magic beanstalk.
121	21	"Forever"	16 March 2020
Princess wants to wake up every day with something pretty to look at next to her bed
122	22	"I Want to be a Sloth"	17 March 2020
When professor holds a race at the castle, Princess learns that winning does not always mean being the fastest
123	23	"New Toilet"	18 March 2020
When the king and queen get a new toilet, it is so big that princess worries that she might fall down it!
124	24	"Inventor"	20 March 2020
The youngster decides to become an inventor just like the clever Professor.
125	25	"Time Thingy"	23 March 2020
Algie and Princess find a time capsule, buried by another little princess and her friend many years ago
126	26	"Apple Juice"	24 March 2020
It is a hot day at the castle and everyone wants a glass of apple juice, but the chef has run out.
127	27	"Tea for Two"	25 March 2020
The King and Queen celebrate their wedding anniversary, and Princess helps them both to prepare a special surprise for each other
128	28	"Cloud Fishing"	26 March 2020
A lack of rain means that the Admiral's pond is almost empty, so Professor and Princess set out to try and find some rain clouds
129	29	"Where's Puss?"	27 March 2020
When the Prime Minister introduces a new cat to Princess, Puss is not happy and decides to run away
130	30	"The Princess Who Cried Wolf"	30 March 2020
An egg is found outside the castle. Keen to find out what's inside, Princess has to contain her excitement long enough to see it hatch.
131	31	"Whoopee Cushion"	31 March 2020
Great Aunty gets a whoopee cushion for her birthday, and she and Princess try to trick someone into sitting on it.
132	32	"Copy Me!"	1 April 2020
The youngster decides that Algie should copy everything that she does so that she can win a castle competition.
133	33	"Charm Bracelet"	2 April 2020
The youngster finds a charm bracelet in her mother's jewellery box, and tries to make one of her own.
134	34	"The Long Goodbye"	3 April 2020
The young royal is fed up of being given so many tasks, so she packs her bags and heads off to a place where does not have to do anything unless she wants to.
135	35	"Old"	6 April 2020
Princess tries to make herself look old so that she can stay up late to see Great Aunty.
