= On Angel Wings =

On Angel Wings is a modern re-telling of the Nativity story written by Michael Morpurgo, music score by Julian Nott and broadcast on BBC One in December 2014.
