= 2nd Brigade Combat Team =

2nd Brigade Combat Team or 2 BCT is a designation for modularized brigades of the United States Army. It may refer to:

- 2nd Brigade Combat Team, 1st Cavalry Division (United States)
- 2nd Brigade Combat Team, 1st Armored Division (United States)
- 2nd Brigade Combat Team, 1st Infantry Division (United States)
- 2nd Brigade Combat Team, 2nd Infantry Division (United States)
- 2nd Brigade Combat Team, 3rd Infantry Division (United States)
- 2nd Brigade Combat Team, 4th Infantry Division (United States)
- 2nd Brigade Combat Team, 10th Mountain Division (United States)
- 2nd Brigade Combat Team, 25th Infantry Division (United States)
- 2nd Brigade Combat Team, 82nd Airborne Division
- 2nd Brigade Combat Team, 101st Airborne Division
- 2nd Brigade Combat Team, 34th Infantry Division (United States)

== See also ==
- 2nd Division (disambiguation)
- 2nd Brigade (disambiguation)
- 2nd Regiment (disambiguation)
- 2 Squadron (disambiguation)
