= Second Army =

Second Army or 2nd Army may refer to:

== Germany ==
- 2nd Army (German Empire), a World War I field army
- 2nd Army (Wehrmacht), a World War II field army
- 2nd Panzer Army

== Russia / Soviet Union ==
- 2nd Air Army
- Second Western Army, fought in the French invasion of Russia
- 2nd Army (Russian Empire), fought at Tannenberg in 1914
- 2nd Army (RSFSR), fought in the Russian Civil War
- 2nd Ukrainian Soviet Army, fought in the Russian Civil War
- 2nd Red Banner Army, a Soviet field army of World War II
- 2nd Cavalry Army
- 2nd Guards Army
- 2nd Guards Combined Arms Army
- 2nd Guards Tank Army
- 2nd Manchurian Army
- 2nd Separate Air Defense Army
- 2nd Shock Army
- 2nd Ukrainian Soviet Army

== Others ==
- Second Army (Australia)
- 2nd Army (Austria-Hungary)
- Second Army (Bulgaria)
- Second Field Army, Chinese Civil War
- Second Army (Egypt)
- Fengtian Second Army
- 2nd Army (France)
- Second Army (Hungary)
- 2nd Army (Italy)
- Second Army (Japan)
- Second Air Army (Japan)
- Second Area Army, Japan
- Second General Army, Japan
- Second Army (Ottoman Empire)
- Second Eastern Army, Ottoman Empire
- Second Polish Army (1944–1945)
- Second Polish Army (1968)
- Second Army (Austro-Prussian War)
- Second Army (Romania)
- Second Army (Serbia)
- Second Army (Turkey)
- Second Army (United Kingdom)
- Second Army (Home Forces), United Kingdom
- Second United States Army
- 2nd Army (Kingdom of Yugoslavia)
- 2nd Army (Yugoslav Partisans)

== See also ==
- List of armies by number
- II Corps (disambiguation)
- 2nd Division (disambiguation)
- 2nd Brigade (disambiguation)
- 2nd Regiment (disambiguation)
- 2nd Squadron (disambiguation)
- 2nd (disambiguation)
