= II Corps =

2nd Corps, Second Corps, or II Corps may refer to:

== China ==
- Second Artillery Corps, People's Republic of China
- 2nd Mobile Corps, People's Republic of China
- 2nd Railway Corps, People's Republic of China

== Finland ==
- II Corps (Finland, Continuation War)
- II Corps (Finland, Winter War)

== France ==
- 2nd Army Corps (France)
- II Cavalry Corps (Grande Armée), a cavalry unit of the Imperial French Army during the Napoleonic Wars
- II Corps (Grande Armée), a unit of the Imperial French army during the Napoleonic Wars

== Germany ==
=== German Empire ===
- II Cavalry Corps (German Empire), Imperial German Army
- II Corps (German Empire), Imperial German Army
- II Royal Bavarian Corps, the Bavarian Army and the Imperial German Army
- II Royal Bavarian Reserve Corps, Bavarian Army and the Imperial German Army

=== Nazi Germany ===
- 2nd Air Corps
- II Army Corps (Wehrmacht)
- 2nd Fighter Corps
- II Flak Corps
- II Luftwaffe Field Corps
- II Parachute Corps
- II SS Panzer Corps, Waffen-SS

== Ottoman Empire ==
- II Corps (Ottoman Empire)
- II Caucasian Corps

== Poland ==
- 2nd Polish Corps in Russia, 1917–1918
- 2nd Polish Corps (Polish Armed Forces in the West), 1943–1947
- 2nd Mechanised Corps (Poland), 2002–2014
- 2nd Polish Corps (2023–present)

== Russian Empire ==
- 2nd Army Corps (Russian Empire)
- 2nd Caucasian Cavalry Corps
- 2nd Caucasus Army Corps
- 2nd Cavalry Corps (Russian Empire)
- 2nd Guards Corps (Russian Empire)
- 2nd Siberian Army Corps
- 2nd Steppe Siberian Corps
- 2nd Army Corps (Armed Forces of South Russia), a unit in the white movement
- Second Cadet Corps
- Second Moscow Cadet Corps

== Soviet Union ==
- 2nd Airborne Corps
- 2nd Cavalry Corps (Soviet Union)
- 2nd Rifle Corps
- 2nd Guards Cavalry Corps
- 2nd Guards Mechanized Corps
- 2nd Guards Rifle Corps
- 2nd Guards Tank Corps
- 2nd Mechanized Corps (Soviet Union)
- 2nd Tank Corps

== Sweden ==
- 2nd Göta Logistic Corps, Sweden
- 2nd Svea Logistic Corps, Sweden

== Ukraine ==
- 2nd Azov Corps
- 2nd Khartiia Corps

== United Kingdom ==
- II Corps (United Kingdom)
- II Anti-Aircraft Corps
- II Cavalry Corps (United Kingdom)
- 2nd (Middle) Buckinghamshire Volunteer Corps

=== Rifle Volunteer Corps ===
- 2nd Anglesey Rifle Volunteer Corps
- 2nd (Brynmawr) Brecknockshire Rifle Volunteer Corps
- 2nd (Carnarvon) Carnarvonshire Rifle Volunteer Corps
- 2nd City of Edinburgh Rifle Volunteer Corps
- 2nd City of London Rifle Volunteer Corps
- 2nd (Sudbury) Derbyshire Rifle Volunteer Corps
- 2nd (Exminster) Devonshire Mounted Rifle Volunteer Corps
- 2nd (Plymouth) Devonshire Rifle Volunteer Corps
- 2nd (Prince of Wales's) Devonshire Rifle Volunteer Corps
- 2nd (Hawarden) Flintshire Rifle Volunteer Corps
- 2nd (Gloucester Docks Company) Gloucestershire Rifle Volunteer Corps
- 2nd (Douglas) Isle of Man Rifle Volunteer Corps
- 2nd (Newport) Isle of Wight Rifle Volunteer Corps
- 2nd (University of Glasgow) Lanarkshire Rifle Volunteer Corps
- 2nd (Duke of Rutland's Belvoir Rifles) Leicestershire Rifle Volunteer Corps
- 2nd (Louth Rifles) Lincolnshire Rifle Volunteer Corps
- 2nd (Bo'ness) Linlithgowshire Rifle Volunteer Corps
- 2nd (Dolgellau) Merionethshire Rifle Volunteer Corps
- 2nd (Welshpool) Montgomeryshire Rifle Volunteer Corps
- 2nd (Towcester) Northamptonshire Rifle Volunteer Corps
- 2nd Northumberland Rifle Volunteer Corps
- 2nd (South Middlesex) Rifle Volunteer Corps
- 2nd Perthshire (The Perthshire Highland) Rifle Volunteer Corps
- 2nd Staffordshire Rifle Volunteer Corps
- 2nd (Longton) Staffordshire Rifle Volunteer Corps
- 2nd Surrey Rifle Volunteer Corps
- 2nd (Cuckfield) Sussex Rifle Volunteer Corps
- 2nd Tower Hamlets Rifle Volunteer Corps
- 2nd (Hackney) Tower Hamlets Rifle Volunteer Corps
- 2nd (Hallamshire) Yorkshire West Riding Rifle Volunteer Corps
- 2nd (Hull) Yorkshire (East Riding) Rifle Volunteer Corps

=== Artillery Volunteer Corps ===
- 2nd (Peterhead) Aberdeenshire Artillery Volunteer Corps
- 2nd (Holyhead) Anglesey Artillery Volunteer Corps
- 2nd (Tarbert) Argyllshire Artillery Volunteer Corps
- 2nd (Ayr) Ayrshire Artillery Volunteer Corps
- 2nd (Banff) Banffshire Artillery Volunteer Corps
- 2nd (Millport) Buteshire Artillery Volunteer Corps
- 2nd (Thurso) Caithness Artillery Volunteer Corps
- 2nd (Earl of Chester's) Cheshire Artillery Volunteer Corps
- 2nd (Looe) Cornwall Artillery Volunteer Corps
- 2nd (Carlisle) Cumberland Artillery Volunteer Corps
- 2nd (Sidmouth) Devonshire Artillery Volunteer Corps
- 2nd (Portland) Dorsetshire Artillery Volunteer Corps
- 2nd (Rosneath) Dumbartonshire Artillery Volunteer Corps
- 2nd (Seaham) Durham Artillery Volunteer Corps
- 2nd (Burghead) Elgin Artillery Volunteer Corps
- 2nd (Grays) Essex Artillery Volunteer Corps
- 2nd (Newport) Fife Artillery Volunteer Corps
- 2nd (Montrose) Forfarshire Artillery Volunteer Corps
- 2nd (Briton Ferry) Glamorganshire Artillery Volunteer Corps
- 2nd (Newnham) Gloucestershire Artillery Volunteer Corps
- 2nd Inverness-shire Artillery Volunteer Corps
- 2nd (Laxey) Isle of Man Artillery Volunteer Corps
- 2nd (Johnshaven) Kincardineshire Artillery Volunteer Corps
- 2nd (Glasgow) Lanarkshire Artillery Volunteer Corps
- 2nd (Crosby) Lancashire Artillery Volunteer Corps
- 2nd (Leith Artillery) Midlothian Artillery Volunteer Corps
- 2nd Norfolk Artillery Volunteer Corps
- 2nd (Sanday) Orkney Artillery Volunteer Corps
- 2nd (Pembroke Dock) Pembrokeshire Artillery Volunteer Corps
- 2nd (Greenock) Renfrewshire Artillery Volunteer Corps
- 2nd (Lochcarron) Ross-shire Artillery Volunteer Corps
- 2nd (Weston-Super-Mare) Somerset Artillery Volunteer Corps
- 2nd (Stirling) Stirlingshire Artillery Volunteer Corps
- 2nd (Walton) Suffolk Artillery Volunteer Corps
- 2nd (Golspie) Sutherland Artillery Volunteer Corps
- 2nd (Port Patrick) Wigtownshire Artillery Volunteer Corps
- 2nd (Bradford) Yorkshire West Riding Artillery Volunteer Corps
- 2nd (Whitby) Yorkshire (North Riding) Artillery Volunteer Corps

== United States ==
=== American Revolution ===
- 2nd Legionary Corps

=== American Civil War ===
- II Corps (Union Army)
- Second Corps, Army of Northern Virginia
- Second Corps, Army of Tennessee

=== Spanish–American War ===
- Second Army Corps (Spanish–American War)

=== World War II ===
- II Armored Corps
- II Corps (United States)

== Other countries ==
- II Army Corps (Argentina)
- 2nd Army Corps (Armenia)
- II ANZAC Corps, Australia and New Zealand
- II Corps (Australia)
- 2nd Army Corps (Azerbaijan)
- 2nd Corps (Army of the Republic of Bosnia and Herzegovina)
- II Canadian Corps
- II Army Corps (Greece)
- II Corps (India)
- 2nd Corps (Iraq)
- II Army Corps (Italy)
- 2nd Army Corps (Luhansk People's Republic)
- II Corps (North Korea)
- II Corps (Pakistan)
- 2nd Krajina Corps, Republika Srpska
- II Corps (South Korea)
- II Corps (South Vietnam)
- 2nd Corps (Syria)
- 2nd Corps (Turkey)
- 2nd Corps (Vietnam)
- 2nd Corps (Yugoslav Partisans)

== Other uses ==
- The Second Corps of Discovery, a 2011 alternate history novel
- Panzer Corps 2, a 2020 video game

== See also ==
- List of military corps by number
- 2nd Army (disambiguation)
- 2nd Brigade (disambiguation)
- 2nd Division (disambiguation)
- 2nd Regiment (disambiguation)
- 2nd Squadron (disambiguation)
- 2nd (disambiguation)
- II (disambiguation)
