= 2nd Infantry =

2nd Infantry may refer to:

- 2nd Infantry Regiment (disambiguation)
- 2nd Infantry Brigade (disambiguation)
- 2nd Infantry Division (disambiguation)

== See also ==
- 2nd (disambiguation)
