= VF-2 =

VF-2 could refer to one of a following US Navy squadrons that carried the designation:

- VF-2 (1927–1942)
- VF-2 (1943–1945)
- VFA-2 - established as VF-2 in 1972.

== See also ==
- VF-6
