= Division II =

Division II or Division 2 may refer to:

== Sports ==
- NCAA Division II, an intermediate-level division of the National Collegiate Athletic Association
- Division 2 (Swedish football)
- Division 2 (Swedish ice hockey), the fourth tier of ice hockey in Sweden
- Division 2 (Swedish women's football)
- Division II (US bandy), the second-highest league for bandy in the United States
- Division II (windsurf board), a class of windsurf board design
- FFHG Division 2, ice hockey, France
- Second Division, a list of divisions in various football leagues
- Division II (NCRHA), a division of the National Collegiate Roller Hockey Association
- Division Two League, Ghana

== Other ==
- Division No. 2, Manitoba, a region of Manitoba, Canada
- Division No. 2, Saskatchewan, a census division within Saskatchewan, Canada
- Division No. 2, Newfoundland and Labrador
- Tom Clancy's The Division 2, a 2019 video game

== See also ==
- 2nd Division (disambiguation), a list of military units and formations
- B Division (disambiguation)
- Division 1 (disambiguation)
- Division (disambiguation)
- 2 (disambiguation)
- Segunda División (disambiguation) (Spanish: Second Division)
