= Arthur Van Haren Jr. =

- Born: April 9, 1920; Superior, Arizona
- Died: August 11, 1992 (aged 72); Dewey, Arizona
- Military career
- Allegiance: United States of America
- Branch: United States Navy
- Service years: 1941–1946
- Rank: Lieutenant
- Nickname: "Van"
- Unit: USS Hornet (CV-12)
- Conflicts: World War II: Battle of the Philippine Sea
- Awards: Distinguished Flying Cross (2); Air Medal; Purple Heart
- Other work: Private-practice attorney for more than 30 years in Phoenix, Arizona

Arthur Van Haren Jr. (April 9, 1920 – August 11, 1992) was a World War II fighter pilot who is considered the top fighter ace of World War II from Arizona. He may be one of very few highly decorated Hispanic fighter-pilot aces in the history of aerial warfare.

== Early life ==
Van Haren was born in Superior, Arizona. His mother, Rose Valenzuela, was Hispanic. His father, Arthur Van Haren Sr., was a popular boxing judge and baseball umpire who was inducted into the Arizona Sports Hall of Fame. Arthur Jr. shared his father's passion for sports, becoming a star quarterback at Phoenix Union High School and later playing for coach Pop McKale at the University of Arizona in Tucson.

== World War II ==
While attending the University of Arizona, Van Haren Jr. joined the Navy at the beginning of World War II, and was part of the famous U.S. Navy Fighting Squadron Two (VF-2) Rippers. VF-2 was featured in the October 23, 1944 Life Magazine edition as the "ace makers" squadron. Van Haren Jr. completed his naval aviation training in 1942. However, he was considered to be such a good pilot that the Navy made him a flight instructor, and he spent over a year teaching other naval aviators how to fly. That year as a flight instructor proved to be invaluable to Van Haren Jr., as he was able to sharpen his flying and air gunnery skills and, at the same time, the U.S. Navy was in the process of moving from the F4F Wildcat to a superior aircraft—the Grumman F6F Hellcat—as a way to better compete against and outclass the Japanese Zero.

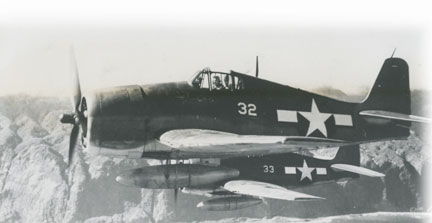
Van Haren Jr. in flight (#32) with Fighting Squadron Two (VF-2 "Rippers")

Based on the USS Hornet (CV-12), a United States Navy aircraft carrier of the Essex class, Lt. Van Haren Jr. flew the F6F Hellcat. He downed nine confirmed enemy planes during grueling combat in the Pacific Theater skies, and had three additional unconfirmed kills. Three of his nine kills occurred in the Marianas Turkey Shoot. Some of his more notable squadron team members included Roy Voris, Daniel A. Carmichael Jr., and his commander, William A. Dean. Van Haren Jr. was awarded several medals and commendations including two Distinguished Flying Cross medals, the Air Medal, and the Presidential Unit Citation. He is widely regarded as Arizona's top Navy fighter-pilot ace of World War II.

A journal kept by Van Haren Jr. sheds light on the routinely dangerous lives of being a fighter-pilot in the Pacific Theater during that time. One entry reads:

I took off today and almost immediately my plane started throwing oil and then started smoking to high heaven. I had a 500 lb. bomb and that worried me to no end 'cause I couldn't get rid of it. The ship told me to land anyway, so I did and my old luck held right out. Just as I hit the deck, the engine burst into flames, but I wasted no time getting out of the darn thing. The boys ganged two more this morning and I wasn't on that hop. I got over the target later in the afternoon and the A.A. (anti-aircraft fire) is still pretty rough. They hit Dennis Floyd head-on. He came down in flames. He was a real fellow. They always seem to get it. It doesn't seem quite fair. He had a baby he never even got to see. What a lousy racket this is!

== Life after the war ==
Van Haren Jr. (right) with his father, Van Haren Sr.

Following his service in the Navy, Van Haren Jr. received his law degree from the University of Arizona in 1948. As part of his legal career in Phoenix, Van Haren served as a deputy Maricopa County attorney, legal counsel to the Maricopa County Planning and Zoning Commission, and as a City of Phoenix municipal judge. However, the majority of his days as a lawyer were spent as a defense attorney in private practice. In 2007, Van Haren Jr. was featured in a book entitled "A Legal History of Maricopa County," which, among other things, documented the numerous practicing attorneys from Maricopa County who had proudly served in World War II.

Van Haren died in 1992 at the age of 72 in Dewey, Arizona. His wife of more than 50 years, Elizabeth Van Haren, died in May 2009.

== See also ==
- Hispanic Americans in World War II
- Hispanics in the United States Navy
