= League One =

League One or League 1 may refer to:

== Association football ==
- EFL League One, the third tier of football in England.
- China League One, the second tier of football in China
- K League 1, the top-tier football in South Korea
- Lao League 1
- League1 British Columbia, semi-professional regional league in Canada
- League1 Ontario, semi-professional regional league in Canada
  - League1 Ontario (women), semi-professional women's regional league in Canada
- Scottish League One, the third tier of football in Scotland
- Thai League 1, the top tier of football in Thailand
- USL League One, a third-tier soccer league in the United States

== Rugby ==
- RFL League One, the third tier of rugby league in Europe
- National League 1, the third tier of rugby union in England

== See also ==
- Ligue 1, the top tier professional football league in France
- Ligue 1 (disambiguation)
- Division 1 (disambiguation)
