= 2nd Frigate Squadron =

2nd Frigate Squadron may refer to the following units:

- 2nd Frigate Squadron (Germany)
- 2nd Frigate Squadron (United Kingdom)
- 2nd Frigate Squadron (Thailand), a unit of the Royal Thai Navy

== See also ==
- Frigate
- 2nd Squadron (disambiguation)
