= 2nd Signal Brigade =

2nd Signal Brigade may refer to:

- 2nd Signal Brigade (United Kingdom)
- 2nd Signal Brigade (United States)

== See also ==
- 2nd Brigade (disambiguation)
