= Second Polish Army =

Second Polish Army may refer to:

- Second Polish Army (1944–1945)
- Second Polish Army (1968)

== See also ==
- Polish Army
- Second Army (disambiguation)
