= 1953–54 Dundee United F.C. season =

Dundee United
1953–54 season
- Chairman: J. Johnston-Grant
- Manager: Willie MacFadyen
- Stadium: Tannadice Park
- Scottish Second Division: 15th W8 D6 L16 F54 A79 P22
- Scottish Cup: Round 1
- League Cup: Group stage

The 1953–54 season was the 46th year of football played by Dundee United, and covers the period from 1 July 1953 to 30 June 1954. United finished in fifteenth place in the Second Division.

== Match results ==
Dundee United played a total of 37 competitive matches during the 1953–54 season.

=== Legend ===
Win
Draw
Loss

All results are written with Dundee United's score first. Own goals in italics

=== Division B ===
Date	Opponent	Venue	Result	Attendance	Scorers
5 September 1953	Dumbarton	H	2-1	8,000	
12 September 1953	Stenhousemuir	A	3-4	1,500	
19 September 1953	St Johnstone	H	1-2	14,000	
26 September 1953	Third Lanark	A	1-9	6,000	
3 October 1953	Arbroath	H	2-2	9,500	
10 October 1953	Kilmarnock	A	2-3	9,168	
17 October 1953	Motherwell	H	1-0	9,000	
24 October 1953	Cowdenbeath	A	2-4	4,000	
31 October 1953	Forfar Athletic	A	1-3	1,200	
7 November 1953	Queen's Park	H	4-0	4,500	
14 November 1953	Greenock Morton	H	1-5	8,000	
21 November 1953	Alloa Athletic	A	3-1	3,000	
28 November 1953	Ayr United	A	1-2	4,500	
5 December 1953	Dunfermline Athletic	H	1-0	8,000	
12 December 1953	Albion Rovers	A	3-3	2,000	
19 December 1953	Dumbarton	A	2-2	3,000	
26 December 1953	Stenhousemuir	H	1-1	5,500	
1 January 1954	St Johnstone	A	1-4	8,000	
4 January 1954	Third Lanark	H	1-1	6,000	
9 January 1954	Arbroath	A	3-4	2,800	
16 January 1954	Kilmarnock	H	0-2	6,500	
23 January 1954	Motherwell	A	1-12	6,000	
6 February 1954	Cowdenbeath	H	3-3	6,000	
20 February 1954	Forfar Athletic	H	0-1	6,000	
27 February 1954	Queen's Park	A	1-3	2,335	
6 March 1954	Greenock Morton	A	1-4	3,000	
13 March 1954	Alloa Athletic	H	0-1	7,500	
20 March 1954	Ayr United	H	4-0	6,000	
27 March 1954	Dunfermline Athletic	A	1-0	3,000	
31 March 1954	Albion Rovers	H	6-2	3,500	

=== Scottish Cup ===
Date	Rd	Opponent	Venue	Result	Attendance	Scorers
30 January 1954	R1	Greenock Morton	A	2-3	6,425	

=== League Cup ===
Date	Rd	Opponent	Venue	Result	Attendance	Scorers
8 August 1953	G7	Greenock Morton	A	3-5	5,000	
12 August 1953	G7	Motherwell	H	0-5	6,000	
15 August 1953	G7	Kilmarnock	A	1-4	10,948	
22 August 1953	G7	Greenock Morton	H	2-2	10,000	
26 August 1953	G7	Motherwell	A	1-3	10,000	
29 August 1953	G7	Kilmarnock	H	0-3	8,000	

== See also ==
- 1953–54 in Scottish football
