= 2nd Mechanized Corps =

2nd Mechanised Corps may refer to:

- 2nd Mechanized Corps (Poland)
- 2nd Guards Mechanized Corps, Soviet Union
- 2nd Mechanized Corps (Soviet Union)

== See also ==
- 2nd Corps (disambiguation)
