= British 2nd Division (disambiguation) =

British 2nd Division may refer to:

- 2nd Airborne Division (United Kingdom)
- 2nd Mounted Division
- 3rd Mounted Division, known in its earliest incarnation as the 2/2nd Mounted Division
- 2nd Cavalry Division (United Kingdom)
- 2nd (African) Division
- 2nd Infantry Division (United Kingdom)
- 2nd Armoured Division (United Kingdom)

== See also ==
- 2nd (Rawalpindi) Division, a British Indian Army before and during World War I
- 2nd Indian Cavalry Division, a British Indian Army during World War I
- 2nd Division (disambiguation)
