= Primera =

Primera may refer to

- Nissan Primera, a car
- Primera Air, a former airline
- Primera división (disambiguation), multiple top division football leagues
- Primera, Texas, a town in Cameron County, Texas
- Alí Primera, Venezuelan musician, composer, poet, and political activist
- Spanish Primera, Spain's highest football competition
