= Primera división =

Primera división (Spanish for First division) can refer to multiple top-division football leagues and other sports:

== Football ==
=== CONMEBOL (South America) ===
- Argentine Primera División
- Bolivian Primera División
- Chilean Primera División
- Paraguayan Primera División
- Peruvian Primera División
- Uruguayan Primera División
- Venezuelan Primera División

=== CONCACAF (Central and North America) ===
- Costa Rican Primera División
- Primera División de Ascenso
- Primera División de Fútbol de El Salvador
- Liga MX or Primera División, Mexico
- Nicaraguan Primera División

=== UEFA (Europe) ===
- La Liga or Primera División, Spain
- Primera Divisió, Andorra
- Primera División (women)

== See also ==
- Segunda División (disambiguation)
- Primera (disambiguation)
- Division 1 (disambiguation)
- 1st Division (disambiguation)
