= VF-2 (1943–1945) =

Fighting Squadron 2
- Active: 1 June 1943 - 9 November 1945
- Country: United States
- Branch: United States Navy
- Type: Fighter
- Nickname: Rippers
- Engagements: World War II

Aircraft flown
- Fighter: Grumman F4F Wildcat; Grumman F6F Hellcat

Fighting Squadron 2 or VF-2 was an aviation unit of the United States Navy. Established on 1 June 1943, it was disestablished on 9 November 1945. It was the third US Navy squadron to be designated as VF-2.

== Operational history ==
=== World War II ===
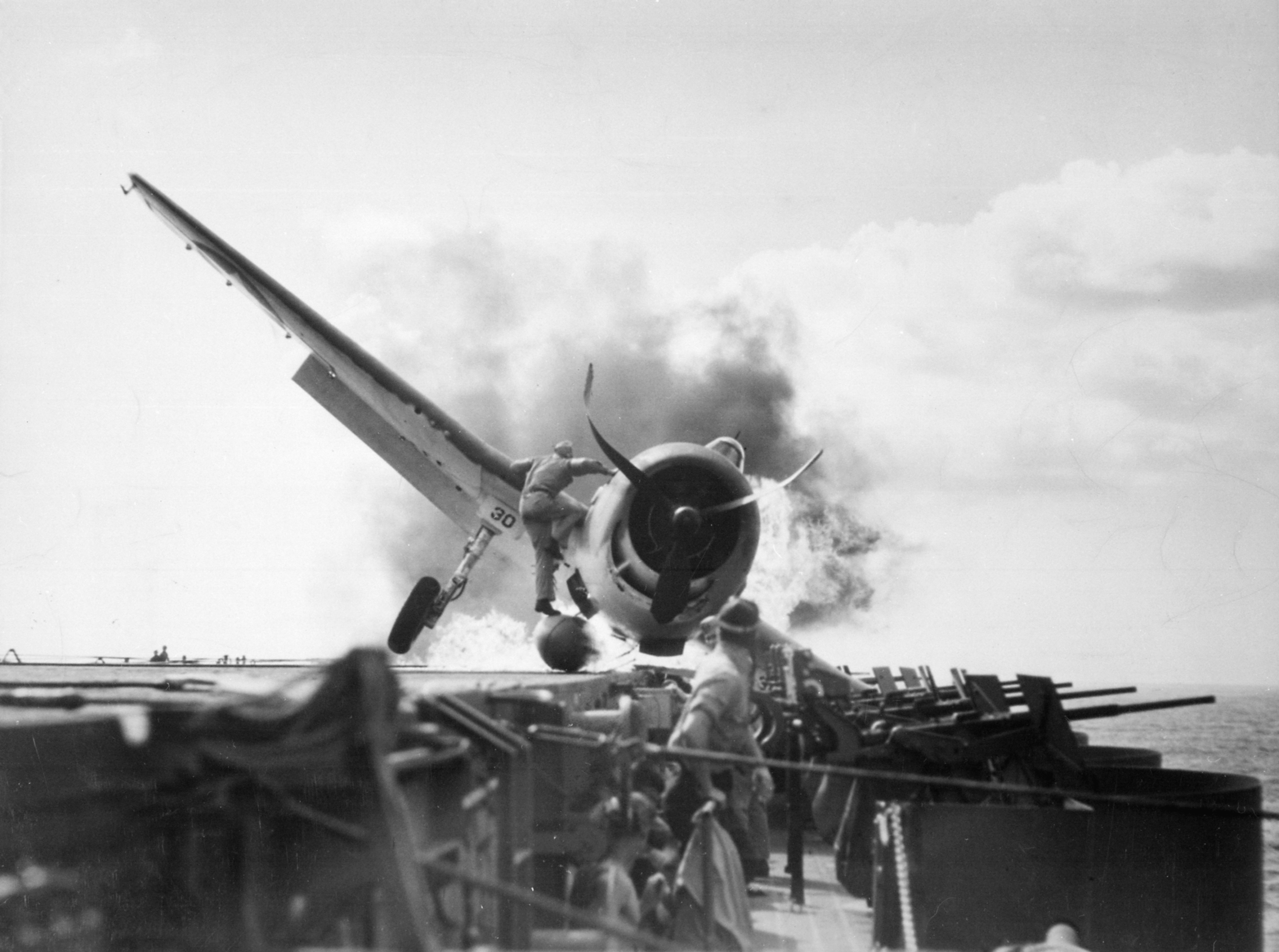
VF-2 Grumman F6F-3 Hellcat crash-lands aboard USS Enterprise, 10 November 1943

VF-2 was established on 1 June 1943, at Naval Air Station Atlantic City. VF-2, known now as the "Rippers," became the first World War II fighting squadron to bear the same designation as a previous unit in the war. Several pilots came from VF-6 and VF-10. The squadron initially deployed 8 FM-1 Wildcats but soon received the Grumman F6F Hellcat.

VF-2 trained on the east-coast until October 1943 when the squadron headed west to San Francisco and then Hawaii. In Hawaii, VF-2 participated in a Marine landing exercise and so impressed the influential "Butch" O'Hare that he requested that VF-2 replace VF-6 in his Air Group aboard USS Enterprise.

From November 1943 to January 1944, VF-2 saw action during the Gilbert and Marshall Islands campaign. VF-2 participated in O'Hare-designed "bat teams" of 1 Grumman TBF Avenger and 2 Hellcats for night interceptions.

In March 1944, VF-2 deployed aboard USS Hornet. From the Hornet, VF-2 participated in strikes against the Marianas on the afternoon of 11 June 1944. Over 200 F6Fs were launched from American carriers 200 miles (320 km) from their targets of Guam and Rota. VF-2 claimed 23 victories during the attack over the Guam airfield, while squadron aircraft closer to Hornet destroyed 3 Mitsubishi G4M "Betty" medium bombers. A second strike on Guam claimed another 10 Japanese aircraft. VF-2 scored 37 victories and only lost 1 plane. The next day, VF-2 attacked the Bonin Islands and Iwo Jima, only pilots which had not previously scored aerial kills were sent on this mission, claiming 17 kills.

Between 19 and 20 June 1944, VF-2 was credited with 47 victories with only 1 airplane damaged beyond repair. On the afternoon of 20 June, Japanese carriers were located approximately 200 miles (320 km) to the west. A strike was ordered with bombs and torpedoes. After the strike, only 6 VF-2 aircraft returned to Hornet, the remaining having landed on other carriers. 5 aircraft were lost at sea. 5 days later, VF-2 claimed 67 kills in 1 day during a sweep of Iwo Jima, losing only 1 F6F Hellcat (an additional one was damaged beyond repair).

During the 1943-44 period, VF-2 had conducted 184 strikes and 2050 sorties, destroying 50,000 tons of ships and 216 airborne airplanes and 245 airplanes on the ground. Losses totaled 3 airplanes in aerial combat and 4 to anti-aircraft fire.

The lead article in the 23 October 1944 edition of Life magazine highlighted VF-2 in a seven-page spread, featuring pictures of 27 of the unit's Aces including Roy "Butch" Voris, later to become Blue Angel 1 in the original Blue Angels flight demonstration team, Arthur Van Haren, Jr. and Connie Hargreaves and Wilbur "Spider" Webb who each became an Ace in a Day.

== See also ==
- History of the United States Navy
- List of inactive United States Navy aircraft squadrons
- List of United States Navy aircraft squadrons
- VF-2 (1927-42)
- VFA-2
