= 2nd Infantry Brigade =

2nd Infantry Brigade may refer to:

- 2nd Infantry Brigade (Australia)
- 2nd Infantry Brigade (Estonia)
- 2nd Infantry Brigade (Hungary)
- 2nd Infantry Brigade (Lebanon)
- 2nd Infantry Brigade (New Zealand)
- 2nd Infantry Brigade (Romania)
- 2nd Infantry Brigade (South Africa)
- 2nd Infantry Brigade (United Kingdom)
- 2nd Infantry Brigade (United States)

== See also ==
- 2nd Brigade (disambiguation)
