= Ligue 1 (disambiguation) =

Ligue 1 is a French professional football league.

Ligue 1 can also refer to:

== CAF (Africa) ==
- Algerian Ligue Professionnelle 1, Algeria
- Guinea Ligue 1, Guinea
- Ligue 1 (Ivory Coast), Ivory Coast
- Ligue 1 Mauritania, Mauritania
- Malian Première Division, Mali
- Niger Ligue 1, Niger
- Senegalese Ligue 1, Senegal
- Tunisian Ligue Professionnelle 1, Tunisia

== Rest of world ==
- Ligue1 Québec, Canada
- Tahiti Ligue 1, Tahiti

== See also ==
- Ligue 2 (disambiguation)
- League One (disambiguation page)
