= Segunda División (disambiguation) =

Segunda División (Spanish for Second Division) can refer to:

- CONMEBOL (South America)
  - Primera B Nacional, Argentina
  - Primera B Boliviana, de Bolivia
  - Primera B Chilena, de Chile
  - Categoría Primera B, de Colombia
  - Ecuadorian Serie B, de Ecuador
  - Paraguayan Segunda División, Paraguay
  - Peruvian Segunda División, Peru
  - Uruguayan Segunda División, Uruguay
  - Venezuelan Segunda División, Venezuela
- CONCACAF (Central and North America)
  - Segunda División de Costa Rica, Costa Rica
  - Segunda División de El Salvador, El Salvador
  - Segunda División de México, Mexico
  - Segunda División de Nicaragua, Nicaragua
- UEFA (Europe)
  - Segunda División, Spain
  - Segunda División B, Spain
  - Segunda División (women), Spain

== See also ==
- Primera División (disambiguation) (Spanish: First Division)
- 2nd Division (disambiguation)
- Division II (disambiguation)
