= A Division =

A Division or A-Division or Division A or variants may refer to:

- A Division (New York City Subway)
- Moldovan "A" Division, football (soccer)
- Tuvalu A-Division, football (soccer)
- Martyr's Memorial A-Division League, football (soccer)

== See also ==
- B Division (disambiguation)
- Division 1 (disambiguation)
