= Ligue 2 (disambiguation) =

Ligue 2 is the second division of men's football in France.

Ligue 2 can refer to:

== CAF (Africa) ==
- Algerian Ligue Professionnelle 2, Algeria
- Ligue 2 (Ivory Coast), Ivory Coast
- Tunisian Ligue Professionnelle 2, Tunisia
- Ligue 2 (Senegal)

== OFC (Oceania) ==
- Tahiti Ligue 2, Tahiti

== See also ==
- Ligue 1 (disambiguation)
