= 2/4th Chasseurs à Cheval Regiment =

2/4th Regiment Mounted Rifles
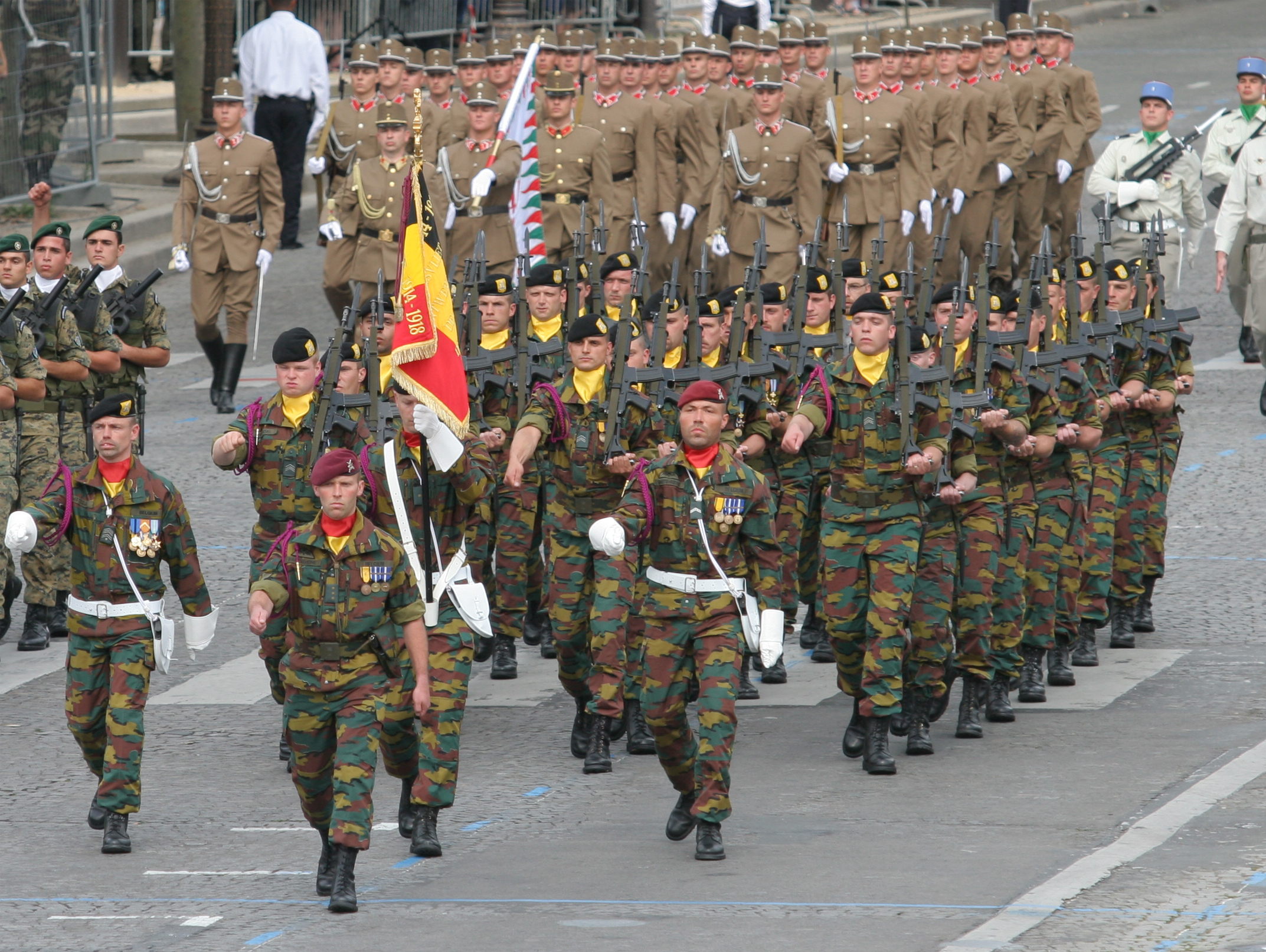
- Soldiers of the 2/4 Chch on parade in Paris, 2007
- Active: September 29, 2004-January 2011
- Country: Belgium
- Branch: Land Component
- Type: Cavalry
- Role: Armoured reconnaissance
- Part of: Motorized Brigade
- Garrison/HQ: Saive

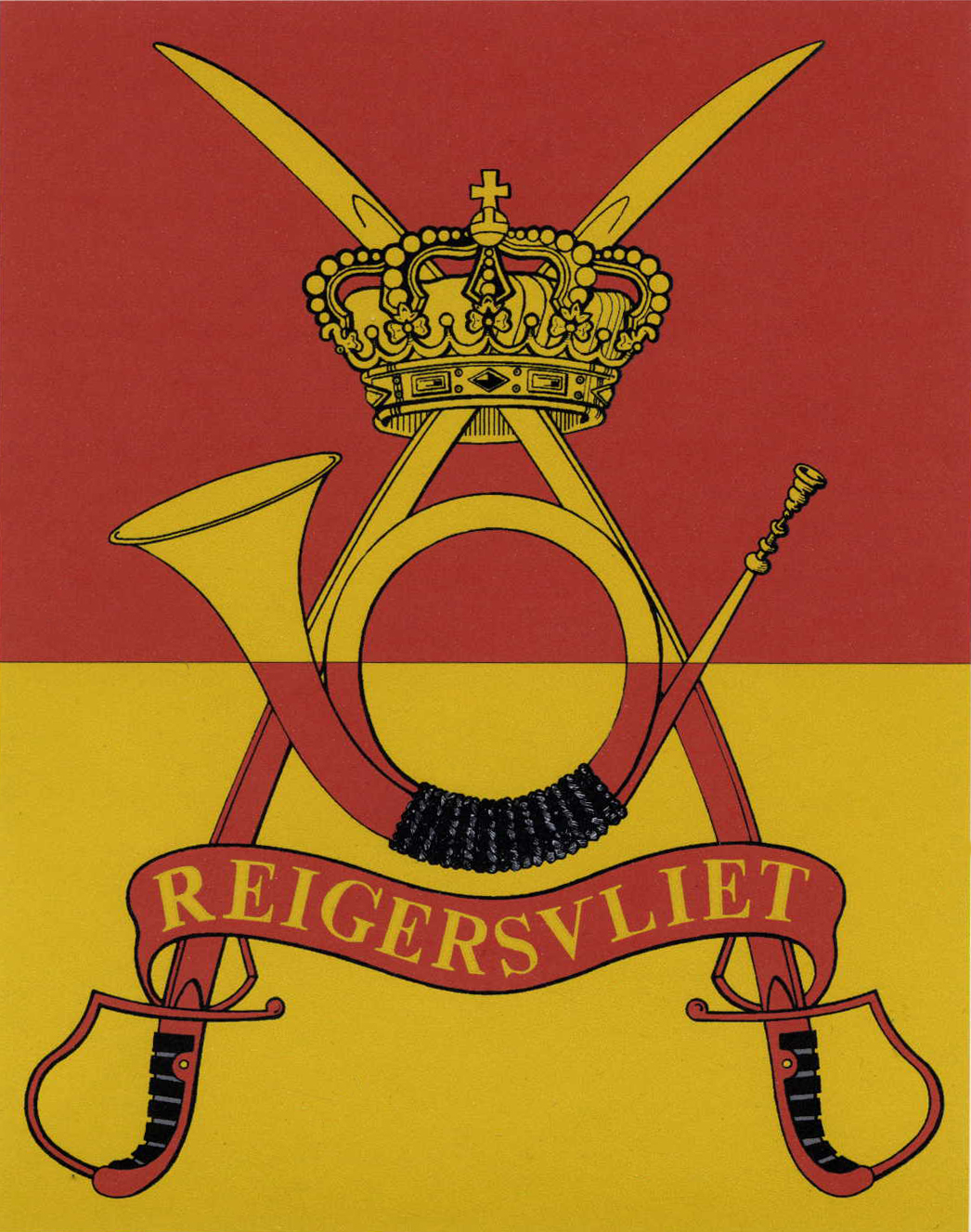
Flag of 2nd/4th Regiment Mounted Rifles.

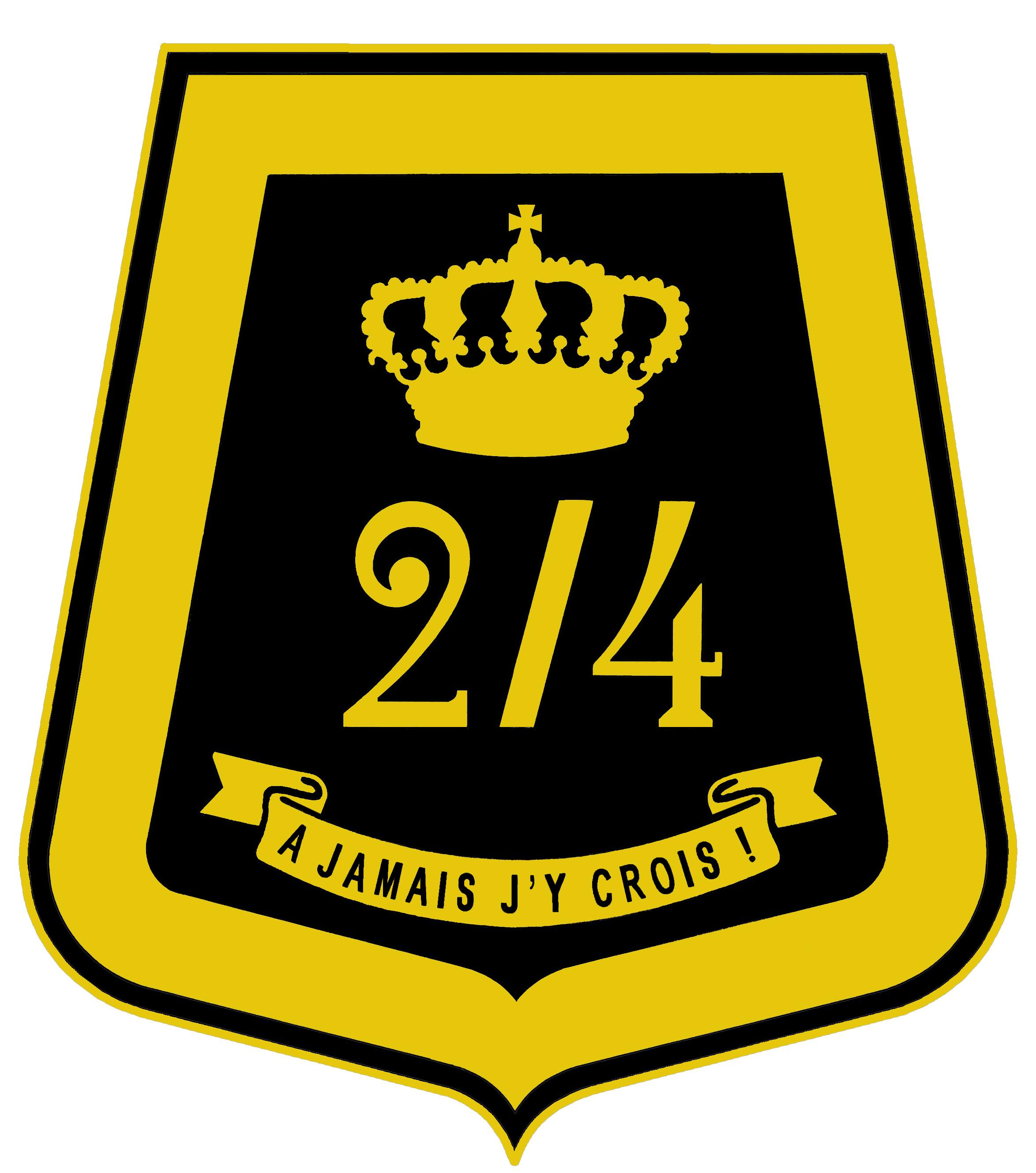
Sabretache of 2nd/4th Regiment Mounted Rifles.

The 2/4th Chasseurs à Cheval Regiment (Dutch: 2-4 Regiment Jagers te Paard, French: 2/4 Régiment de Chasseurs à Cheval) was a cavalry regiment in the Land Component of the Belgian Armed Forces. The regiment was the armoured reconnaissance regiment of the Motorized Brigade.

== History ==
=== 2nd Regiment of Mounted Rifles ===
In March 1814, Prince Ferdinand de Croÿ received permission to create a regiment of Hussars. It was part of Légion Belge until 1 September 1814, when it was integrated in the army of the United Kingdom of the Netherlands.

When William I became King of the Netherlands, the Belgian Regiment of Hussars of Croÿ becomes the 8th Regiment of Hussars. The regiment kept its original uniform until after the Battle of Waterloo, where it was part of the Dutch-Belgian cavalry.

After the Belgian Revolution, the 8th Hussar Regiment become the 2nd Chasseurs à Cheval Regiment (ChCh), by decree of the Provisional Government of Belgium in October 1830. Its first commander was Colonel d'Hanne de Steenhuyse in Ghent.

On 20 August 1914, the regiment distinguished itself during the Siege of Antwerp. On 16 October 1914 the Battle of the Yser began, leading to four years of battles in the trenches on the Yser front. On 6 March 1918, the 2nd ChCh was able to withstand a massive attack by the enemy at Reigersvliet. The regiment was part of a counter-attack together with other units of the Cavalry Division. After the Allied Occupation of the Rhineland, the 2nd ChCh moved to Namur.

On 10 May 1940, the regiment (by then motorized) occupied bridges over the river Ourthe in the Ardennes. On 13 and 14 May 1940, it took part in a hard battle behind the river Gette. From 25 May 1940 until the end of the hostilities, the 2nd ChCh is able to stop all enemy attacks on the river Lys.

The regiment was definitively reformed in 1952. From then onwards, it was based in Germany at Camp Vogelsang, Arnsberg Kassel and Ludenscheid. An American organizational structure and material was adopted. It was equipped with American Patton tanks. In 1973, it was re-equipped with the CVR-T tank which was replaced in 1986 by the Leopard 1. The regiment remained a tank battalion until 1992. From then onwards, the 2nd ChCh, with its surveillance radars, was revised in a reconnaissance role. It left Altenrath in Germany for Saive in 2003 with the disbanding of the Belgian Forces in Germany (FBA-BSD).

=== 4th Regiment of Mounted Rifles ===
The 4th Chasseurs à Cheval Regiment was founded during the re-organisation of the army in 1913, and was thus the youngest cavalry unit of the Belgian army. It participated in World War I and helped the Second Army Division in a reconnaissance role. It distinguished itself during the Siege of Antwerp between 30 August and 8 October 1914. During the second break-out of Antwerp, the 4th Chch made it as far as the surroundings of Leuven. During the retreat of Antwerp, its defense of the Lisse canal, near Somerghem on 12 October 1914, was able to repulse an enemy attack, though with significant losses. Thanks to this, the Division was able to retreat intact to Bruges. The regiment adapted to the trench warfare of the Yser Front as an infantry regiment. It was dissolved in February 1918, though it was resurrected in 1919. From October 1921 it was based in Mons. Another reorganization of the army in 1923 lead to its second dissolution on 3 August. It was not re-mobilized during the Second World War, though former members of the regiment served in other units.

On 1 February 1961, the 4th Regiment of Chasseurs à Cheval was re-created as the Regiment of reconnaissance of the 1st Belgian Corps. It had its base in Quartier Houhulst in Werl in Germany. In July 1964 the Regiment moved to a new base at Quartier Reigersvliet in Arnsberg. As a consequence of a re-organisation of the Armed Forces, the Regiment was being reduced to a Squadron in 1993. On 3 June 1994 the unit left Arnsberg after 30 years of stay. That same day the Squadron 4th Chasseurs à Cheval was officially installed as an independent reconnaissance squadron of the 1st Mechanized Division in Altenrath, between Cologne and Bonn, until the end of 2001. On 1 January 2002, it became the unit of reconnaissance of the 7th Mechanized Brigade in Marche-en-Famenne. The 4th Chch Squadron remained in Altenrath until September 2003 when they returned to Belgium. After this move to Saive, near Liège, the unit was promoted to the status of Regiment again. Under the new expansion, it included a regimental headquarters, a support squadron and one Recce Squadron (5 platoons, being three of reconnaissance, one of infantry and one ATk (anti-tank) platoon).

On 29 September 2004, as a result of the fusion of the 2 units, the 2/4 Regiment of Chasseurs à Cheval was created. The first deployment of the new combined unit was BELKOS 22 in Kosovo between July and December 2006

== Disbandment ==
As part of the restructuring of the Belgian defense in January 2011, the regiment joined with the 1st Regiment of Mounted Rifles/Guides to form the ISTAR Battalion (Intelligence, Surveillance, Target Acquisition and Reconnaissance) based at Heverlee.

== Lineage ==
Lineage
(United Kingdom of the Netherlands) Regiment of Hussars of Croÿ	(United Kingdom of the Netherlands) 8th Hussars Regiment	(Belgium) 2nd Regiment Mounted Rifles	(Belgium) 2nd/4th Regiment Mounted Rifles
		(Belgium) 4th Regiment Mounted Rifles	(Belgium) 2nd/4th Regiment Mounted Rifles
