= 2nd Combat Aviation Brigade (South Korea) =

Aviation brigade of South Korea army

- 제2전투항공여단
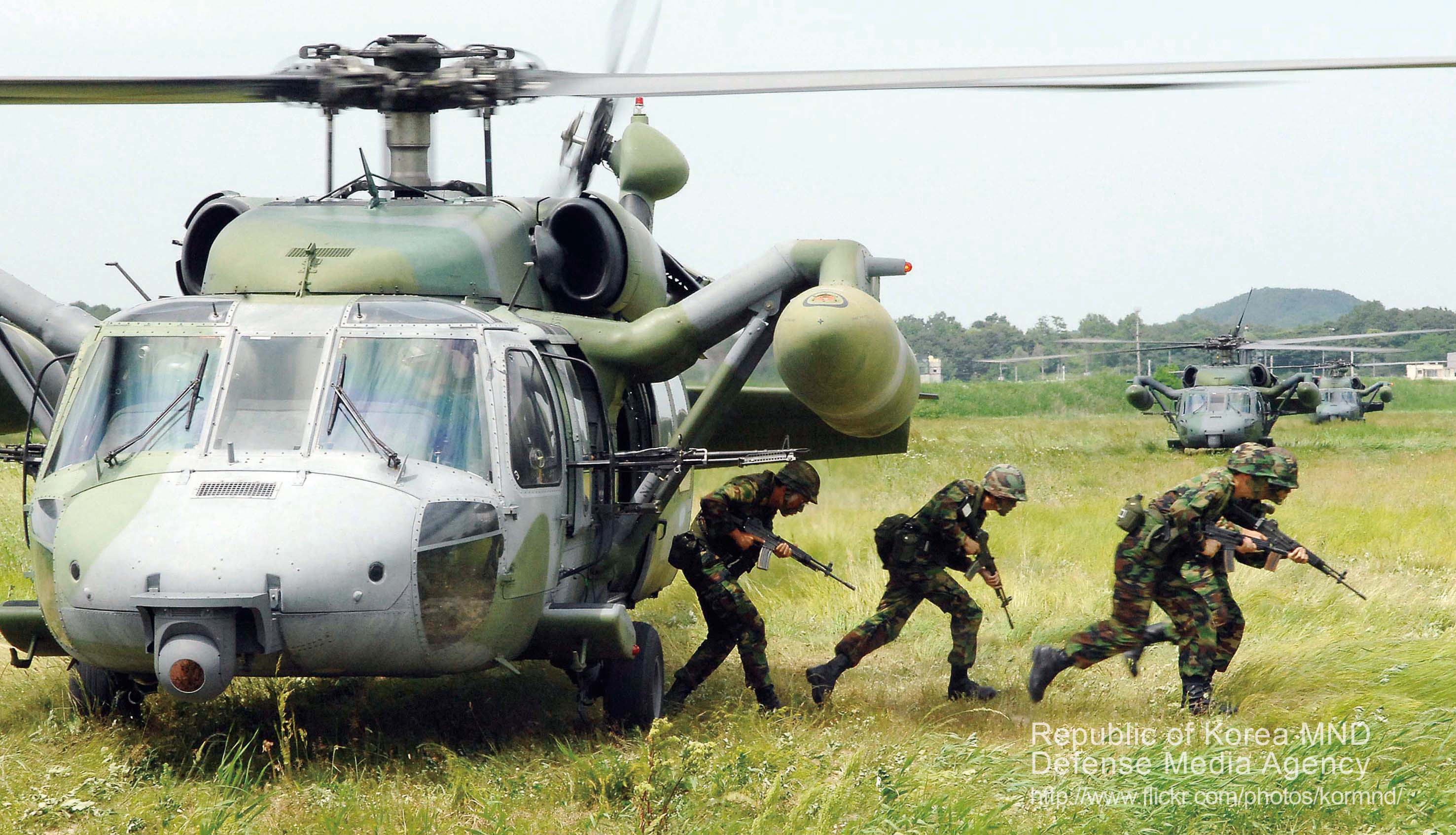
- Maneuver and air-assault exercise conducted by the 2nd Aviation Brigade
- Active: 1 September 1973 – present
- Country: South Korea
- Branch: Republic of Korea Army
- Type: Army aviation
- Size: Brigade
- Part of: Army Aviation Operations Command
- Garrison/HQ: Icheon, Gyeonggi Province

The 2nd Combat Aviation Brigade (Korean: 제2전투항공여단) is a military formation of the Republic of Korea Army. The brigade is subordinated to the Army Aviation Operations Command (Republic of Korea).

== History ==
On 1 September 1973, it was founded as the 1st Aviation Group.

On 1 June 1978, it was transferred to the newly established 1st Aviation Brigade and changed its name to 61st Aviation Group. In addition, the 202nd and 203rd aviation battalions, operating UH-1H as subordinate units, were created.

In order to suppress the Gwangju Uprising in 1980, in accordance with the "Helicopter Operation Plan" of the Army Headquarters, Brigadier General Song Jin-won ordered the unit, along with 1st Aviation Brigade to deployed to Gwangju on 22 May.

== Organization ==
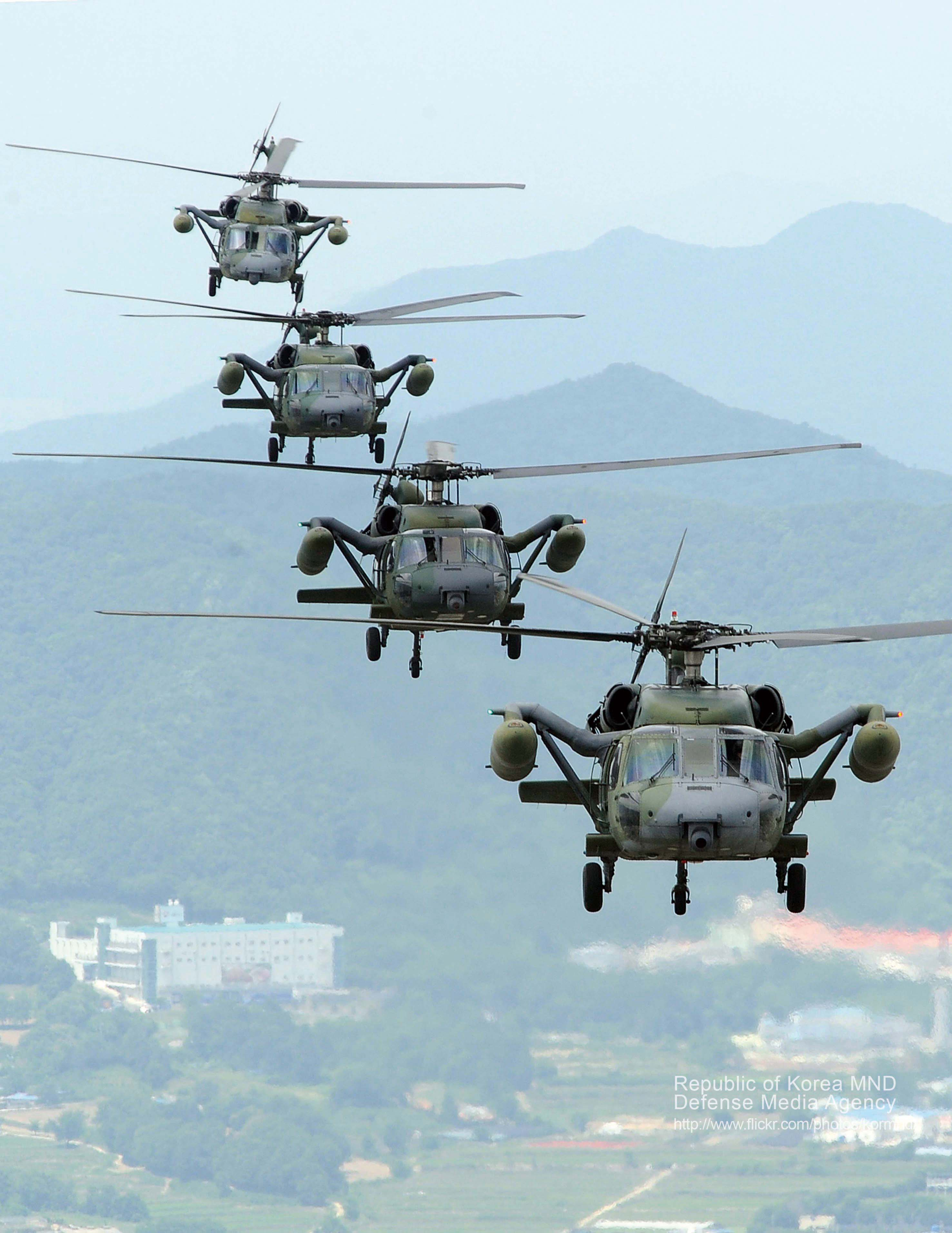
UH-60 helicopters of the brigade's aviation battalion are maneuvering through the mountain area.

- Headquarters
- 60th Aviation Group (Air Command and Control unit)
- 301st Aviation Battalion (CH-47D)
- 302nd Aviation Battalion (CH-47D)
- 601st Aviation Battalion (UH-60)
- 603rd Aviation Battalion (UH-60) (garrisoned in Sejong City)
- 605th Aviation Battalion (UH-60) (garrisoned in Sejong City)
