= VF-2 (1927–1942) =

Fighting Squadron 2
- Active: 1 January 1927 – 1 July 1942
- Country: United States
- Branch: United States Navy
- Type: Fighter
- Nickname(s): Flying Chiefs
- Engagements: World War II

Aircraft flown
- Fighter: F2A Buffalo; F4F Wildcat

Fighting Squadron 2 or VF-2 was an aviation unit of the United States Navy. Originally established as VF-2 on 1 January 1927, it was redesignated VF-2B on 1 July 1927, redesignated as VF-2S on 1 July 1932, redesignated as VF-2B in April 1933, redesignated as VF-2 on 1 July 1937, it was disestablished on 1 July 1942. It was the second US Navy squadron to be designated as VF-2.

== Operational history ==
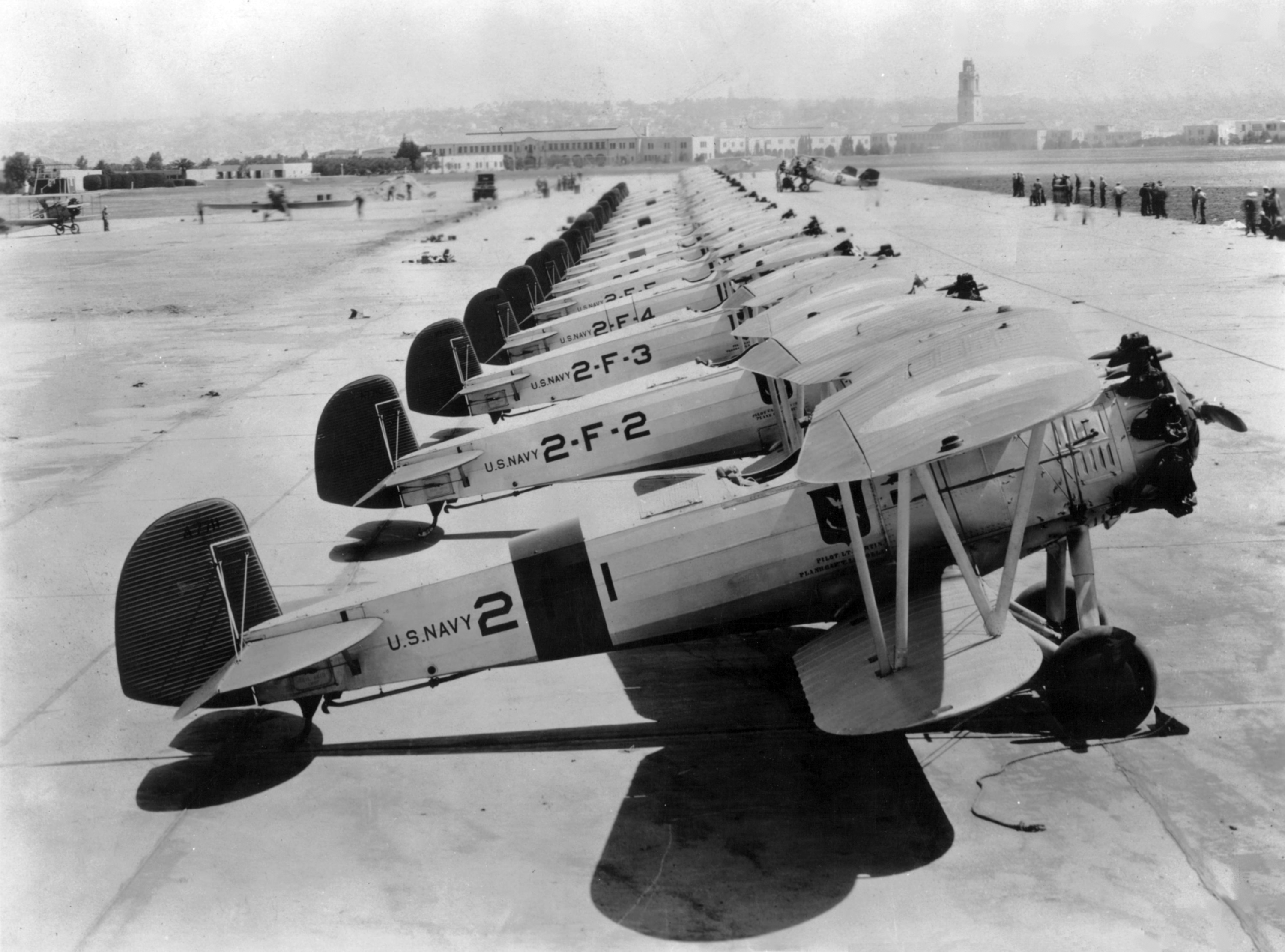
VF-2B Boeing F3Bs at NAS North Island c.1929

=== World War II ===
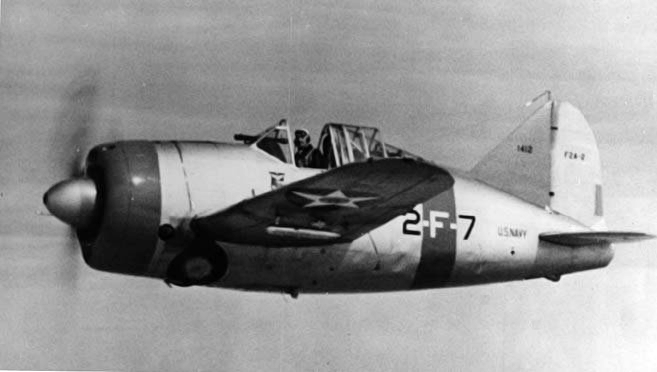
VF-2 F2A Buffalo in 1941

At the time of the Japanese Attack on Pearl Harbor, VF-2 was flying the F2A Buffalo, but soon transitioned to the F4F Wildcat.

The squadron's first combat occurred during the Battle of the Coral Sea, the world's first engagement between aircraft carriers. On 7 May 1942, VF-2 escorted strike aircraft against the Japanese aircraft carrier Shōhō. VF-2 claimed 6 confirmed aerial kills and 3 probable kills. The next day, Japanese carriers Shokaku and Zuikaku exchanged air strikes with the US force, and VF-2 lost 5 aircraft while claiming 11 kills. USS Lexington succumbed to torpedo damage and sank. Without an aircraft carrier, VF-2 was disestablished on 1 July 1942.

== See also ==
- History of the United States Navy
- List of inactive United States Navy aircraft squadrons
- List of United States Navy aircraft squadrons
- VF-2 (1943-5)
- VFA-2
