= 2nd Motorised Brigade (Hungary) =

The 2nd Motorised Brigade was a formation of the Royal Hungarian Army that participated in the Axis invasion of Yugoslavia during World War II.

== Organization ==
Structure of the brigade:

- Headquarters
- 2nd Armoured Reconnaissance Battalion
- 4th Battalion, 2nd Motorized Infantry Regiment
- 5th Battalion, 2nd Motorized Infantry Regiment
- 6th Battalion, 2nd Motorized Infantry Regiment
- 11th Bicycle Infantry Battalion
- 12th Bicycle Infantry Regiment
- 2nd Motorized Artillery Battalion
- 2nd Motorized Anti-Aircraft Battery
- 2nd Motorized Engineer Company
- 2nd Motorized Bridging Engineer Company
- 2nd Motorized Signal Company
- 2nd Motorized Traffic Control Signal Company
- 2nd Motorized Brigade Service Regiment

== Commanders ==
- Brigade General Ödön Zay (1 Oct 1938 - 15 Jan 1939)
- Colonel Sándor Horváth (15 Jan 1939 - 1 Mar 1940)
- Brigade General József Heszlényi (1 Mar 1940 - 29 Oct 1940)
- Brigade General János Vörös (29 Oct 1940 - 1 Dec 1940)
- Colonel Ferenc Bisza (1 Dec 1940 - 1 Oct 1941)
