= 2nd Panzer Brigade (Bundeswehr) =

- German: Panzerbrigade 2
- Divisional insignia
- Active: 16 March 1959 – 31 March 1993
- Country: West Germany (1959-1990); Germany (1990-1993)
- Allegiance: Bundeswehr
- Branch: German Army
- Size: Brigade; 2,900 soldiers (1989)
- Garrison/HQ: Braunschweig

Commanders
- Last commander: Wulf Wedde

The 2nd Panzer Brigade (German: Panzerbrigade 2), known as 2nd Panzergrenadier Brigade (Panzergrenadierbrigade 2) from 1959 until 1981, was an armored brigade of the Bundeswehr. It was subordinate to 1st Panzer Division and active from 1959 to 1993.

== History ==
Upon the foundation of the German Army in 1955/56, the 1st Army Structure (Heeresstruktur 1) was issued to bring about a Bundeswehr of twelve divisions with 36 brigades. The "Combat Group A1" (Kampfgruppe A 1) of 1st Grenadier Division, which had been assembled on 1 July 1956 in the Scharnhorst Barracks in Hanover-Bothfeld, received its first conscripts on 1 April 1957 and, after early 1958, contained the 1st, 11th, 21st and 61st Grenadier Battalions as well as the 1st Panzer Battalion. The staff HQ was at Hanover, the 1st, 11th, 21st and 61st Grenadier Battalions were at Hanover, Wolfenbüttel, Hanover and Braunschweig, respectively, whereas the 1st Panzer Battalion was at Augustdorf.

As part of the 2nd Army Structure (Heeresstruktur 2) of 16 March 1959, Combat Group A1 formally became the 2nd Panzergrenadier Brigade and, over the course of the year 1959, redeployed to the Henry the Lion Barracks in Braunschweig. The Grenadier Battalions were renamed Panzergrenadier Battalions; the 11th and 61st Battalions became the 22nd and 23rd Battalions, the 12th Battalion became the 312th Battalion. Additionally, companies of panzer engineers, panzer reconnaissance, Panzerjägers, and anti-aircraft forces (each company with the cardinal number "20") were added to the Brigade. In 1960, the 24th Panzer Battalion (newly assembled in Dedelstorf) was added to the 2nd Panzer Brigade.

In the 3rd Army Structure (Heeresstruktur 3) of 1972, the 2nd Panzer Battalion remained in the order of battle, but the 22nd Battalion at Wolfenbüttel was dissolved and partially inserted into the Observation Battalion 13 of 1st Artillery Regiment. In 1971, the brigade was at the center of the WDR documentary Unternehmen Manöver, in which the WDR journalists accompanied the 2nd Panzer Brigade's soldiers during a military maneuvre at Baumholder training area.

In late 1989, the peacetime strength of the 2nd Panzer Brigade was 2,900 soldiers, expected in case of emergency to grow to 3,300.

As part of the 5th Army Structure (Heeresstruktur 5) after German reunification and the military reductions following the Treaty on the Final Settlement with Respect to Germany, the 25th Panzer Artillery Battalion, 20th Panzer Engineer Company and 21st Panzer Battalion were dissolved in 1992. The 2nd Panzer Brigade itself was deactivated on 31 March 1993 and ceased to exist.
