= Roy Marlin Voris =

American World War II flying ace

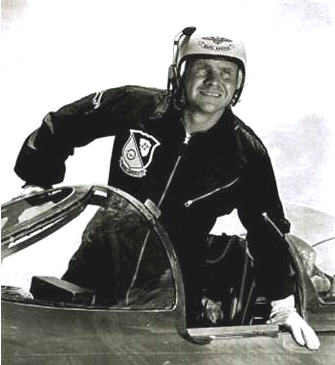
- Blue Angels Flight Leader "Butch" Voris poses in the cockpit of an F9F-5 Panther fighter jet in 1952.
- Born: September 19, 1919; Los Angeles, California
- Died: August 10, 2005 (aged 85); Monterey, California
- Military career
- Allegiance: United States
- Branch: United States Navy
- Service years: 1941–1963
- Rank: Captain
- Nickname: "Butch"
- Units: USS Enterprise (CV-6); USS Hornet (CV-8); USS Ranger (CVA-61)
- Commands: Blue Angels (1946–47, 1951)
- Conflicts: World War II: Battle of Guadalcanal; Battle of the Santa Cruz Islands; Battle of Tarawa; Battle of the Philippine Sea
- Awards: Distinguished Flying Cross (3); Purple Heart; Air Medal (11)
- Other work: NASA consultant

Captain Roy Marlin "Butch" Voris (September 19, 1919 – August 10, 2005) was an aviator in the United States Navy, a World War II flying ace, and the founder of the Navy's flight demonstration squadron, the Blue Angels. During his 22-year naval career Voris flew everything from biplanes to jets, and afterward was instrumental in the development of the Navy's F-14 Tomcat strike fighter and NASA's Apollo Lunar Module (LM), both produced by the Grumman Aerospace Corporation.

Often called a "fighter pilot's fighter pilot" and ranked with other better-known American military aviation greats such as Gregory "Pappy" Boyington and Chuck Yeager, Voris was a big man with close-cropped hair, known for his even-temperedness and coolness in the cockpit. Owing to his superb piloting skills, he survived numerous accidents and emergency situations. Voris was nearly killed by a Japanese Zero that attacked his aircraft during the defense of Guadalcanal in what he later described as his first "real" dog fight (which earned him a Purple Heart).

== Early years ==
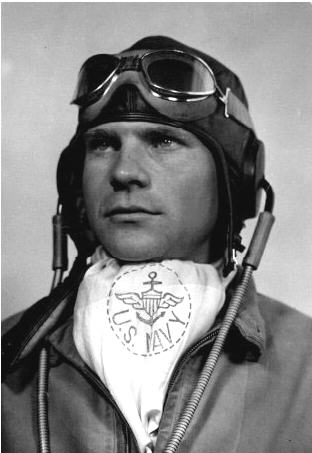
A photograph of Butch Voris taken at Oakland, California, in 1941, upon his entering the Navy's flight training program

Voris was born in Los Angeles but was raised in Aptos, and later Santa Cruz where he attended high school. He briefly considered a career as a mortician, but instead decided to enroll in Salinas Junior College, receiving his associate degree there in 1939. As a youngster, Voris (whose hobby was building model airplanes out of balsa wood and tissue paper) was thrilled by the exploits of Eddie Rickenbacker and other World War I aces, and would spend hours watching the big planes come into Mines Field (Los Angeles Airport).

It is therefore no surprise that in 1941 the twenty-two-year-old Voris answered the call of a recruiting poster and enlisted in the Navy. He related the story in an April, 2004 interview: "When the war clouds were rolling in, I was living in San Francisco. I walked past a big recruitment sign that said 'Fly Navy' with a pilot looking off into the wild blue yonder standing on the wing of the plane." Voris passed a series of exams and was called to duty in Oakland a month later. Voris entered the Navy's flight training program, and was still in flight school when the Imperial Japanese Navy launched its attack on Pearl Harbor.

He received his commission, was promoted to the rank of ensign and got his "wings of gold" (which identified him as a naval aviator) at NAS Corpus Christi in February, 1942. Voris was soon flying combat missions off the aircraft carrier USS Enterprise in the South Pacific.

== Military career ==
=== World War II ===
Voris took part in countless fighter attacks against enemy airfields and other installations as the Navy advanced through the Pacific Theater of Operations. During his initial deployment he piloted the Grumman F4F Wildcat with Fighter Squadron 10 (VF-10), the Grim Reapers, under the command of Vice Admiral James H. Flatley aboard the aircraft carrier USS Enterprise (CV-6). On his next cruise he flew Grumman F6F Hellcats with VF-2, the Rippers, out of the battles at Guadalcanal in support of the 1st Marine Division, off the Enterprise, and later the USS Hornet (CV-12).

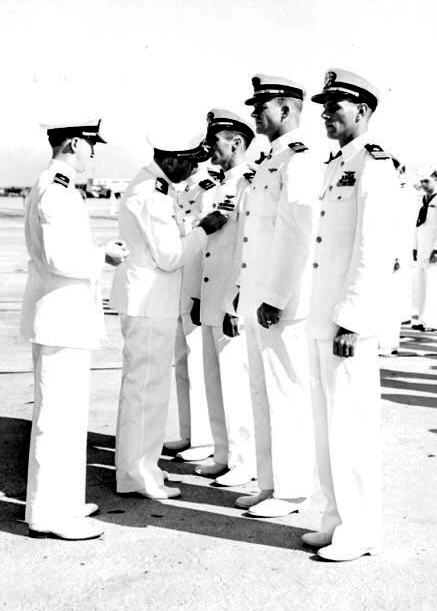
Lt. Cdr. Voris (second from right) waits to receive his 11th Air Medal in 1946.

Aboard the Hornet, Voris saw action in the Battle of the Santa Cruz Islands, the Battle of Tarawa, and the Battle of the Philippine Sea (the so-called "Great Marianas Turkey Shoot" wherein over 300 Japanese aircraft were shot down by American fliers, who enjoyed a more than 12-to-1 kill-to-loss ratio in one day). It is during these engagements in the Pacific War that he earned "fighter ace" status, recording a total of eight confirmed fighter-to-fighter kills.

I shot down my first Japanese Zero at Guadalcanal. But I didn't see one coming up behind me and I got shot up and knocked out of the sky. I didn't bail out—they'll shoot you out of your parachute and if you go into the water the sharks will eat you. I was full of shrapnel wounds and had a dead stick—I'd lost the engine—but I got back to Guadalcanal. I was a lucky boy.

Voris rejoined the Enterprise and VF-2 after recovering from his injuries, where he was chosen by Lieutenant Commander Edward "Butch" O'Hare and Admiral Arthur W. Radford as one of four "Bat Team" fighter pilots to conduct experimental night fighter operations to intercept and destroy enemy bombers attacking Allied landing forces on the atoll of Tarawa. He was assigned to the famed "Mission into Darkness", which was launched near dusk in pursuit of the Japanese fleet. Knowing they would likely exhaust their fuel supplies long before returning to the safety of their carrier, the flight nevertheless sought out their target. Voris landed on fumes after shooting down a Japanese Zero fighter and flying by dead reckoning in total darkness.

After the War's end, Voris (now holding the rank of lieutenant commander) was assigned as Chief Instructor for advanced tactics at the Naval Advanced Training Command (NATC) at Naval Air Station Daytona Beach, Florida.

=== Blue Angels 1st tour (1946–1947) ===
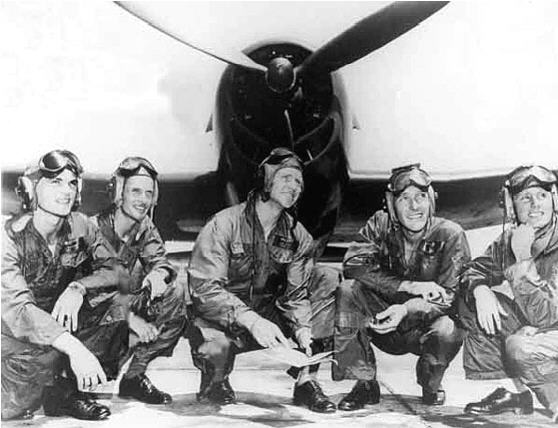
The first Blue Angel Flight Demonstration Squadron, 1946–1947 (l to r): Lt. Al Taddeo, Solo; Lt. (J.G.) Gale Stouse, Spare; Lt. Cdr. R.M. "Butch" Voris, Flight Leader; Lt. Maurice "Wick" Wickendoll, Right Wing; Lt. Mel Cassidy, Left Wing

In 1946, Chief of Naval Operations Admiral Chester Nimitz ordered the formation of a flight exhibition team to boost Navy morale, demonstrate naval air power, and maintain public interest in naval aviation. However, an underlying mission was to help the Navy generate public and political support for a larger allocation of the shrinking defense budget. Another reason was to show potential recruits that aviation was inherently safe once pilots were trained. Being able to perform 3-dimensional close proximity manoeuvring would also be awe inspiring. In April of that year, Rear Admiral Ralph Davison personally selected Voris to assemble and train a flight demonstration squadron, naming him Officer-in-Charge and Flight Leader. Voris selected two fellow instructors to join him (Lt. Maurice "Wick" Wickendoll and Lt. Mel Cassidy, both veterans of the War in the Pacific), and the three spent countless hours developing the show. The group perfected their initial maneuvers in secret over the Florida Everglades so that, in Voris' words, "...if anything happened, just the alligators would know." Another significant driving factor for Voris (and the secrecy) was that Army Air Corps aeronautical genius, hero and legend, Jimmy Doolittle, now a general in the newly created U.S. Air Force, might just create a similar aerial demonstration team and beat the Navy in going public. Their first demonstration before Navy officials took place on May 10, 1946 and was met with enthusiastic approval.

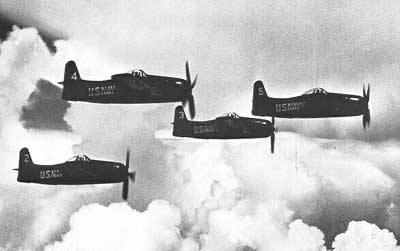
On August 25, 1946, the Blue Angels transitioned to the Grumman F8F-1 Bearcat and introduced the famous "diamond" formation.

On June 15 Voris led a trio of Grumman F6F-5 Hellcats, specially modified to reduce weight and painted sea blue with gold leaf trim, through their inaugural 15-minute-long performance at the Southern Air Show at Jacksonville, Florida's Craig Field. The group, known simply as the "Navy Flight Exhibition Team", thrilled spectators with low-flying maneuvers performed in tight formations, and (according to Voris) by "...keeping something in front of the crowds at all times. My objective was to beat the Army Air Corps. If we did that, we'd get all the other side issues. I felt that if we weren't the best, it would be my naval career." The Blue Angels' first public demonstration also netted the team its first trophy, which sits on display at the team's current home in Naval Air Station Pensacola.

The team soon became known worldwide for its spectacular aerobatic stunts. During a trip to the "Big Apple", Lt. Wickendoll came across an advertisement in The New Yorker for the city's popular "Blue Angel" nightclub. Voris liked the name and on July 19 officially made it the team's moniker. On August 25 the squadron upgraded their aircraft to the F8F-1 Bearcat. Though Voris left the team on May 30, 1947 the "Blues" continued to perform nationwide until the start of the Korean War in 1950, when (due to a shortage of pilots) the team was disbanded and its members were ordered to combat duty. Once aboard the aircraft carrier USS Princeton the group formed the core of VF-191, Satan's Kittens.

=== 1947–1951 ===
In the Summer of 1947, Voris was attached to the Naval Bureau of Aeronautics in Washington, D.C. (where he spent the next two years); he also married his high school sweetheart, Thea. From June 9, 1949 to January 20, 1950 Lt. Cdr. Voris led VF-113, the Stingers, home ported at Naval Air Station San Diego. The Blue Angels were officially recommissioned in October, 1951, and Voris was again tasked with assembling the flight team (he was the first of only two commanding officers to lead the group twice).

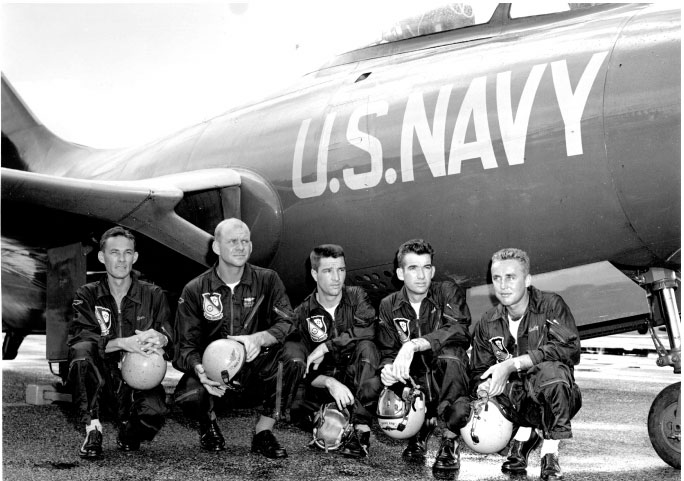
The second Blue Angels flight demonstration squadron to be commanded by Lieutenant Commander Roy M. "Butch" Voris (l to r): Lt. Tom Jones, Lt. Cdr. R.M. Voris, Lt. Pat Murphy, Lt. A. R. Hawkins, Lt. Bud Rich

=== Blue Angels 2nd tour (1952–1953) ===
Voris returned to re-form and lead the Blue Angels, this time flying the combat-proven F9F-5 Panther fighter jet. In the summer of 1952, during a demonstration for United States Naval Academy midshipmen at NAS Corpus Christi, Voris' and another plane collided in midair:

We were doing a Corpus Christi demo show for a midshipman orientation. We'd had to cancel the show the first day because it was too rough. We started the show with a parade pass at a 30-to-40-degree bank showing off the US Navy on the bottom of the wings. We were going 400 knots—that's fast—200 feet in the air, when coming down for a pass we hit a massive [wind] shear and we collided. Number four in the slot came up beneath me and sheared off underneath the nose. He pulled up and ejected at low altitude. He was still in the seat when he hit the water.

Voris blacked out momentarily, regaining consciousness a mere twenty-five feet above the ground, while still traveling at 400 knots:

Ground control was screaming at me, 'Eject! Eject!' but you have to be at least 2,000 feet up to eject. The seats weren't very dependable and you could break your neck and back. I had a jammed rudder and started to lose control. Anyway, I got down. It was the worst accident we ever had.

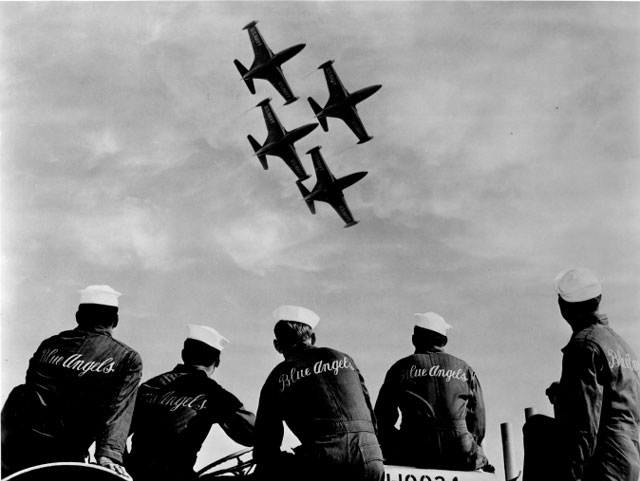
The Blue Angels exhibit their signature "diamond" formation during a 1952 show.

Despite losing almost all control of his aircraft resulting from its nearly severed tail section, Voris miraculously managed to land safely; tragically, the pilot who hit the water died. The team was back in the air two weeks later. Voris stayed with the team until December 1952, when he was selected to take command of Satan's Kittens aboard the USS Princeton (CV-37). He was considered by the Blue Angels to be the "father" of the team right up until his death.

=== 1952–1963 ===
After his second tour with the "Blues", Voris rounded out his career by going on to skipper VF-191, and (after being promoted to the rank of commander) Attack Carrier Air Group 5 (CAG-5) aboard the USS Ranger (CVA-61). Voris retired at the rank of captain in 1963.

== Post-military career ==
Upon his retirement from the Navy, Captain Voris went to work for the Grumman Corporation in Bethpage, New York, assisting in the development of the Navy's F-14 Tomcat and NASA's Lunar Module. In 1973 he accepted a position in the National Aeronautics and Space Administration's (NASA) Office of Industry Affairs. In 1985, Voris retired and he and his wife moved to Monterey, California. Voris' unpretentious manner and good humor kept him in demand as a speaker at air shows and other aviation-related events. He remained active in naval aviation through a variety of organizations such as the Golden Eagles, a highly distinguished and select group of Naval and Marine Corps aviators.

== Decorations and honors ==
During his more than two decades of military service, Captain Voris received 3 Distinguished Flying Crosses, 11 Air Medals, 3 Presidential Unit Citations, and the Purple Heart, along with a dozen other medals. In 1993, Voris was honored at the United States Air Force's annual "Gathering of Eagles" ceremony as one of twenty aviators worldwide who have made significant contributions in the field of aviation. He was inducted into the International Air Show Hall of Fame in 2000, and the Navy Aviation Hall of Fame in Pensacola, Florida in May, 2002. The 2004 California Air Show held in Salinas, California was dedicated in his honor. An aircraft bearing Voris' name sits outside the Jacksonville Naval Air Station, where the passenger terminal is also named for him.

On October 10, 2005 a memorial service was held at the Fort Ord Main Chapel in the town of Seaside, California. Immediately thereafter, full military honors (which included a 21-gun salute and the traditional folding and presentation of the American flag) followed. The service ended with a six-plane missing man formation flyover by the Blue Angels. "Butch Voris' contributions to naval aviation and the nation's history were epic", said Cdr. Steve Foley, flight leader and commanding officer of the 2005 Blue Angels. "Concluding his memorial service with a fly-by the 2005 Blue Angel team will be a highlight of not only this season, but our careers as naval aviators as well. It truly reinforces our responsibility to preserve the legacy and ideals Boss Voris bestowed upon us 59 years ago. Said Lt. Garrett Kasper, public spokesman for the Blue Angels, "It is our team's honor to conduct a flyby, as our final salute to Captain Voris, and the most fitting way we can pay our respects to the Voris family."

== Quotations ==
- "We got paid sooner than the other guys, 'cause they expected you to die. We always said, 'you gotta kid about this stuff."
- "It's the precision and perceived daring and high risk that you see in the team. We come down to ground level so people can see the types of maneuvers fighters do in combat. I think the public deserves to see what their taxes are paying for."
- "You fly as close together as a couple of feet...every once in a while you do a little bump and so forth. People ask me, 'How close do they fly?' and I'll say if we hit each other, it's too close and if we don't, we're too far apart."

== See also ==
- List of people from California
- List of people from Los Angeles
