= Second Division =

Sports league division

In sport, the Second Division, also called Division 2 or Division II is usually the second highest division of a league, and will often have promotion and relegation with divisions above and below. Following the rise of Premier League style competitions, many leagues known as the Second Division have fallen to a lower tier in countries' football league system.

This list of Second Divisions in association football, divided by authority, includes country and actual level.

== AFC ==
- K League Challenge, South Korea (Second tTier).
- J. League Division 2, Japan (Second Tier).
- I League 2, India (Second Tier).

== UEFA ==
- Albanian Second Division, Albania (third tier)
- Segona Divisió, Andorra (second tier)
- Belarusian Second League, Belarus (third tier)
- Belgian Second Division, Belgium (second tier)
- Second League of the Republika Srpska, Bosnia and Herzegovina (third tier)
- Czech 2. Liga, Czech Republic (second tier)
- Cypriot Second Division, Cyprus (second tier)
- Druga HNL, Croatia (second tier)
- Danish 2nd Division, Denmark (third tier)
- England:
  - Football League Second Division (1892–1992; second tier, re-branded as Football League First Division after creation of top-level FA Premier League)
  - EFL Championship, (second tier)
  - Isthmian League Second Division, (ninth tier)
- Second League of Estonia (third tier)
- 2. deild, Faroe Islands (third tier)
- Kakkonen, Finland (third tier)
- Ligue 2, France (second tier)
- Second Macedonian Football League (Macedonian Vtora Liga), Republic of Macedonia (second tier)
- Meore Liga, Georgia (third tier)
- 2. Fußball-Bundesliga, Germany (second tier)
- Football League (Greece) (formerly Beta Ethniki, Greece (second tier)
- Nemzeti Bajnokság II (Hungarian National Championship II), Hungary (second tier)
- 2. deild karla, Iceland (third tier)
- Italy:
  - Serie B, (second tier)
  - Lega Pro Seconda Divisione (fourth tier)
- Maltese Second Division, Malta (third tier)
- Montenegrin Second League, Montenegro (second tier)
- Norwegian Second Division (2. divisjon), Norway (third tier)
- II liga (Poland) (Polish Second League), Poland (third tier)
- Portugal:
  - Liga de Honra, formerly "Segunda Divisão de Honra", (second tier)
  - Segunda Divisão (Portuguese Second Division), (third tier)
- Liga II, Romania
- Russian Second Division, Russia (third tier)
- Scottish Football League Second Division, Scotland (third tier)
- 2. Liga (Slovakia) (Slovak Second League), Slovakia (second tier)
- Slovenian Second League, Slovenia (second tier)
- Segunda División de La Liga, Spain
- Swedish football Division 2, Sweden (fourth tier)
- TFF Second League, Turkey (third tier)
- Ukrainian Second League, Ukraine (third tier)
- V.League 3, Vietname (third tier)
- Welsh Football League Division Two, Wales (second tier)

== CONCACAF ==
As of August 30, 2017

- Aruban Division Uno, Aruba (second tier)
- Barbados Division One, Barbados (second tier)
- Segunda División de Costa Rica, Costa Rica (second tier)
- Segunda División de El Salvador, El Salvador (second tier)
- GFA First Division, Grenada (second tier)
- Primera División de Ascenso, Guatemala (second tier)
- Honduran Liga Nacional de Ascenso, Honduras (second tier)
- Jamaica:
  - Eastern Confederation Super League (second tier)
  - KSAFA Super League (second tier)
  - South Central Confederation Super League (second tier)
  - Western Confederation Super League (second tier)
- Mexico:
  - Ascenso MX (second tier)
  - Segunda División de México (formerly Segunda División Profesional) (third tier)
- Segunda División de Nicaragua, Nicaragua (second tier)
- Liga Nacional de Ascenso, Panama (second tier)
- SKNFA Division 1, Saint Kitts and Nevis (second tier)
- SLFA Second Division, St. Lucia (second tier)
- SVB Hoofdklasse, Suriname (second tier)
- National Super League, Trinidad and Tobago (second tier)
- United States:
  - United Soccer League (second tier)
  - North American Soccer League (second tier)

== CONMEBOL ==
- Primera B Nacional, Argentina (second tier)
- Campeonato Brasileiro Série B, Brazil (second tier)
- Ecuadorian Serie B, Ecuador (second tier)
- Paraguayan Segunda División, Paraguay (second tier)
- Peruvian Segunda División, Peru (second tier)
- Uruguayan Segunda División, Uruguay (second tier)
- Venezuelan Segunda División, Venezuela (second tier)

== See also ==
- B Division (disambiguation)
