= The Second Corps of Discovery =

2011 novel by Francis Scott Key

The Second Corps of Discovery: 1811 Journal of the Jackson and Clark Expeditionary Force
- First edition
- Author: F. Scott Key
- Translator: Matsu Ri
- Language: English
- Genre: alternate history
- Publisher: DigitalKu
- Publication date: February 2011
- Publication place: United States
- Media type: trade paperback
- Pages: 488
- ISBN: 978-1-4538-7451-6

The Second Corps of Discovery: 1811 Journal of the Jackson and Clark Expeditionary Force is a 2011 alternative history novel written by F. Scott Key and translated by Matsu Ri. It is presented in a chronicle format from the daily journal of F. Scott Key, who documented his involvement with the Expedition from 1811 to 1812. The story depicts a follow-up attempt to reach the Pacific Coast, after the original Lewis and Clark Expedition was considered lost. Many true historical events and characters are used as the basis for the story.

== Plot summary ==
By 1811 the First Corps of Discovery under Captain Lewis and Lieutenant Clark has been considered lost for 5 years. Any country that attempted to map the Pacific Coast by land or sea routes has completely failed. The United States of America has yet to press its claims for the Louisiana Purchase. President James Madison fears a British invasion, with the support of a unified Indian nation under Tecumseh, that would claim the Northwest Territories and cause a dissolution of the Union. Under these dire threats, a second Corps of Discovery is formed as a military expedition to reach the West Coast. Its primary goals are to learn what happened to Lewis and Clark and the first Corps members, and find the mythical "all-water route" across North America. However, there are several other secret missions and secondary objectives to the Expedition that are disclosed during the journey. Brigadier General George Rogers Clark, brother of Lieutenant William Clark and the original choice of President Thomas Jefferson, commands the new group. Supporting him are two other military men and Indian fighters, Colonel Andrew Jackson and Doctor William Henry Harrison. While primarily an army operation, Second Corps is required to do a great deal of scientific and diplomatic work. This explains the nature and skills of the members recruited for the journey, and the advanced prototype technology they use. The F. Scott Key Journal is heavily interlaced with Christian themes due his religious background. The continental crossing often resembles a detective story, as mysteries are unexpectedly revealed, based on conflicting rumors attributed to British and Spanish efforts of deception. These involve the belief that some unknown native civilization occupies areas of the Pacific Coast, perhaps Inca or Aztec tribes that escaped the Spanish Conquistadors and remained isolated to protect themselves against further invasions. Many of the historical characters in the story fulfill their actual destiny, but in an alternative environment. F. Scott Key was a part of the Expedition for a longer period of time, but his surviving account only covers his last year. This unbroken daily record details a complete story and is a major segment of the overall adventure. His manuscript was written originally in English, but translated into a foreign dialect. This additional premise supports ulterior plot elements.

== Historical figures as fictional characters ==
The following individuals were major characters, minor characters, or mentioned in reference to a vital part of the story.

=== United States ===
- Francis Scott Key
- Colonel Andrew Jackson
- Doctor William Henry Harrison
- Captain Stephen Stillwell - Great-Grandfather of General Joseph Stilwell
- Lieutenant John M. James - Grandfather of Jesse Woodson James
- Sergeant Fletcher Pershing - Great-Grandfather of General John Joseph Pershing
- Sergeant Charles R. Sherman - Father of William Tecumseh Sherman
- Quirin P. Hohlweck - Grandfather of Civil War Historian Philip John Hohlweck
- Captain Meriwether Lewis
- Lieutenant William Clark
- President Thomas Jefferson
- President James Madison
- John Jacob Astor
- Major Steven Long
- Lieutenant Zebulon Pike

=== France ===
- François Péron
- Pierre Mallet
- Paul Mallet

=== Prussia and the German states ===
- Corporal Christian Schramm - Great-Grandfather of diplomat Henri Schramm
- Johann Friedrich Blumenbach

=== United Kingdom ===
- Captain James Cook
- Captain Robert Gray
- Sir Francis Drake
- Sir Alexander MacKenzie
- Captain John Meares

=== Spain ===
- Saint Francis Xavier
- Sebastián Vizcaíno
- Francisco Vásquez de Coronado
- Juan Manuel de Ayala
- Bruno de Heceta
- Hernán Cortés
- King Charles V

=== Portugal ===
- Father Alessandro Fróis - Descendant of Luís Fróis

=== Shawnee Tribe ===
- Tecumseh
- Tenskwatawa

=== Manda Tribe ===
- Shahaka

=== Papal State ===
- Pope Gregory XV
- Pope Urban VIII

=== Nippon / Kashū ===
- Matsukura Tatsuya - Descendant of Matsukura Shigemasa and Matsukura Katsuie
- Masuda IV Sei Taishōgun - Descendant of Amakusa Shirō
- Yokozawa Daifu - Descendant of Yokozawa Shogen
- Shimazu Tadatsune
- Hasekura Rokuemon Tsunenaga
- Date Masamune

== Historical facts as fictional events ==
Major elements of the plot were based on the following documented occurrences.

- Great Comet of 1811
- 1811–12 New Madrid earthquakes
- Treaty of Tordesillas
- Louisiana Purchase
- Lewis and Clark Expedition

== Famous landmarks as fictional locations ==
The setting of specific places used the following geographic areas.

- Missouri River
- Colonial America
- New Spain
- Alcatraz Island
- Santa Catalina Island
