= Division 1 =

Division 1 or Division One may refer to:

== Association football ==
- Azadegan League, the second-tier professional football league in Iran
- Brisbane Premier League Division 1, the second-tier professional football league in Brisbane, Queensland, Australia
- Danish 1st Division, of the Danish football league system
- Division 1 (Guernsey), the second-tier football league in the Channel Island Guernsey
- Division 1 (Swedish football), now Ettan Football, the third-tier football league in Sweden
- Football League First Division, the former top division of the English football league system
- Hong Kong First Division League, the second-tier football league in Hong Kong
- I liga, the second-tier football league in Poland
- J1 League, Japan Professional Football League
- League of Ireland First Division, the top-flight division of the Irish football league system
- Ligue 1, the top-flight division of the football league system in France
- The Saudi First Division League, the second-tier football league in Saudi Arabia
- Scottish Football League First Division, the now-defunct second-tier football league in Scotland from 1975 to 2013
- Thai Division 1 League, the second-tier football league in Thailand
- UAE First Division League, the second-tirer football league in United Arab Emirates
- Victorian State League Division 1, the second-tier soccer league in Victoria, Australia
- Welsh Football League Division One, the former top division of the Welsh football league system

== Other sports ==
- Division 1 (bandy), the third tier of the Swedish bandy league system
- Division 1 (Swedish women's football)
- Division I (NJCAA)
- Division I (US bandy), the top level bandy league in the United States
- Division Élite, a French baseball league
- First division (baseball), a baseball term
- FFHG Division 1, the second tier of French men's ice hockey
- Cyprus Basketball Division 1
- Hockeyettan, formerly Division 1, the third tier of ice hockey in Sweden, previously the first tier from 1944 to 1975
- LFH Division 1, the top tier of French women's team handball
- LNH Division 1, the top tier of French men's team handball
- NCAA Division I, the highest level of intercollegiate athletics in the U.S.
- Women's Flat Track Derby Association Division 1, the highest level of competition in women's flat track roller derby

== See also ==
- Football League One
- Primera división (disambiguation)
- 1st Division (disambiguation)
- A Division (disambiguation)
- Division II (disambiguation)
- Division (disambiguation)
- One (disambiguation)
