= 2nd Railway Corps =

2nd Railway Corps (1956-57)
- Chinese: 铁道兵第2军
- Active: 1956.11-1957.4 (inactive)
- Country: (China)
- Type: Railway Troops
- Part of: People's Liberation Army Railway Troops
- Garrison/HQ: Nanping, Fujian

Commanders
- Notable commanders: Xiao Chunxian

2nd Railway Corps (Chinese: 铁道兵第2军) of the People's Liberation Army was a military formation mainly focusing on railway construction missions. It was activated in November 1956 in Nanping, Fujian. The corps commander was Senior Colonel Xiao Chunxian. (Note: 肖春先)

The corps was composed of 1st, 5th and 6th Railway Divisions.

The corps was intended to participate in the construction of Yingtan-Xiamen railway. However, due to the change of the construction plan, the activation of the corps was aborted. On April 6, 1957, the corps was formally deactivated.
