= Para-Commando Field Artillery Battery =

Artillery Group
- Active: May 14, 1973
- Country: Belgium
- Branch: Land Component
- Type: Airborne field artillery forces
- Role: Artillery observer Close-quarters battle Counter-battery fire Fire support Force protection Indirect fire Parachuting; Raiding; Reconnaissance; Special reconnaissance
- Part of: 1st Brigade
- Garrison/HQ: Brasschaat

The 2nd Field Artillery Regiment/Field Artillery Battery ParaCommando (Dutch: 2 Regiment Veldartillerie/Batterij Veldartillerie ParaCommando) or 2A was an airborne forces unit of the Belgian Army, which specialized in airborne operations, artillery observer, combat patrol, counter-battery fire, fire support, indirect fire, reconnaissance, self-defense on the battlefield if the fire base is attacked or attacked while moving, and special reconnaissance. It was established from personnel drawn from the 4"2 Mortar Platoon of the 1st Parachute Battalion, the 2nd Commando Battalion, and the 3rd Parachute Battalion. The regiment was the field artillery battalion of the 1st Brigade until 2010. In later years, the M109A2 howitzer was replaced by the MO-120 120 mm mortar.

2A consisted of 4 batteries:

- Mortar By
- WFS By
- DLOC By
- H&S By
