= 2nd Brigade =

2nd Brigade may refer to:

== Armenia ==
- 2nd Independent Motorized Rifle Brigade

== Australia ==
- 2nd Brigade (Australia)
- 2nd Armoured Brigade (Australia)
- 2nd Light Horse Brigade
- 2nd Motor Brigade (Australia)

== British Burma ==
- 2nd Burma Infantry Brigade

== British India ==
- 2nd (Nowshera) Brigade
- 2nd (Sialkot) Cavalry Brigade
- 2nd Quetta Brigade

== British Malaya ==
- 2nd Malaya Infantry Brigade

== Canada ==
- 2nd Canadian Armoured Brigade
- 2nd Canadian Infantry Brigade
- 2 Canadian Mechanized Brigade Group

== Chile ==
- 2nd Armored Brigade (Chile)

== China ==
- 2nd Armored Brigade (People's Republic of China)
- 2nd Marine Brigade (People's Republic of China)

== Croatia ==
- 2nd Guards Brigade (Croatia)

== Estonia ==
- 2nd Infantry Brigade (Estonia)

== France ==
- 2nd Armoured Brigade (France)
- 2nd Free French Infantry Brigade

== Germany ==
- 2nd Panzer Brigade (Bundeswehr)
- 2nd Panzer Brigade (Wehrmacht)
- 2nd SS Infantry Brigade

== Hungary ==
- 2nd Cavalry Brigade (Hungary)
- 2nd Infantry Brigade (Hungary)
- 2nd Motorised Brigade (Hungary)

== India ==
- 2nd Indian Infantry Brigade

== Iran ==
- 2nd Karbala Brigade
- 2nd Marine Brigade (Iran)

== Ireland ==
- 2nd Brigade (Ireland)

== Israel ==
- Carmeli Brigade

== Italy ==
- 2nd Carabinieri Mobile Brigade

== Japan ==
- 2nd Guards Mixed Brigade (Japan)
- 2nd Independent Mixed Brigade (Imperial Japanese Army)
- 2nd Raiding Brigade

== Kyrgyzstan ==
- 2nd Guards Motor Rifle Brigade

== Lebanon ==
- 2nd Infantry Brigade (Lebanon)

== Lithuania ==
- 2nd Lithuanian National Cavalry Brigade

== Moldova ==
- Ștefan cel Mare 2nd Motorized Infantry Brigade

== New Zealand ==
- 2nd Infantry Brigade (New Zealand)

== Poland ==
- 2nd Brigade, Polish Legions
- 2nd Armoured Brigade (Poland)
- 2nd Mountain Brigade (Poland)

== Romania ==
- 2nd Mountain Troops Brigade (Romania)

== Russia ==
- 2nd Guards Spetsnaz Brigade

== Serbia ==
- 2nd Army Brigade

== Slovakia ==
- 2nd Mechanized Brigade (Slovakia)

== South Africa ==
- 2nd South African Infantry Brigade

== South Korea ==
- 2nd Armored Brigade (South Korea)
- 2nd Combat Aviation Brigade (South Korea)

== Spain ==
- 2nd Mixed Brigade

== Turkey ==
- 2nd Commando Brigade (Turkey)

== Ukraine ==
- 2nd Galician Brigade (Ukraine)

== United Kingdom ==
- 2nd Anti-Aircraft Brigade (United Kingdom)
- 2nd Armoured Brigade (United Kingdom)
- 2nd Cavalry Brigade (United Kingdom)
- 2nd Composite Mounted Brigade
- 2nd Gibraltar Brigade
- 2nd Guards Brigade (United Kingdom)
- 2nd Infantry Brigade (United Kingdom)
- 2nd Mounted Brigade (United Kingdom)
- 2nd Parachute Brigade (United Kingdom)
- 2nd Provisional Brigade (United Kingdom)
- 2nd Reserve Brigade
- 2nd (Royal Naval) Brigade
- 2nd Signal Brigade (United Kingdom)
- 2nd South Western Mounted Brigade
- 2nd Special Service Brigade
- 2nd (West Africa) Infantry Brigade

=== Artillery units ===
- 2nd Brigade, Royal Field Artillery
- 2nd Brigade, Cinque Ports Division, Royal Artillery
- 2nd Brigade, Lancashire Division, Royal Artillery
- 2nd Brigade, Northern Division, Royal Artillery
- 2nd Brigade, North Irish Division, Royal Artillery
- 2nd Brigade, Scottish Division, Royal Artillery
- 2nd Brigade, Welsh Division, Royal Artillery
- 2nd County of London Brigade Royal Field Artillery
- 2nd East Lancashire Brigade (The Manchester Artillery), Royal Field Artillery
- 2nd Lowland Brigade, Royal Field Artillery
- 2nd Highland Brigade, Royal Field Artillery
- 2nd North Midland Brigade, Royal Field Artillery
- 2nd South Midland Brigade, Royal Field Artillery
- 2nd (Cumberland Yeomanry) Army Brigade, Royal Field Artillery
- 2nd (Lancashire) Army Brigade, Royal Field Artillery
- 2nd (Lowland) Medium Brigade, Royal Garrison Artillery
- 2nd Volunteer (Essex) Brigade, Eastern Division, Royal Artillery
- 2nd Volunteer (Dorsetshire) Brigade, Western Division, Royal Artillery
- 2nd Welsh Brigade, Royal Field Artillery
- 2nd Wessex Brigade, Royal Field Artillery
- 2nd Brigade, Western Division, Royal Artillery
- II Brigade, Royal Horse Artillery
- II Brigade, Royal Horse Artillery (T.F.)
- Prince of Wales's 2nd Brigade, Eastern Division, Royal Artillery

== United States ==
- 2nd Brigade, 7th Infantry Division (United States)
- 2nd Brigade, 24th Infantry Division (United States)
- 2nd Brigade, 104th Division (United States)
- 2nd Engineer Brigade (United States)
- 2nd Infantry Division Sustainment Brigade
- 2nd Maneuver Enhancement Brigade
- 2nd Marine Expeditionary Brigade (United States)
- 2nd Medical Brigade
- 2nd Reserve Officers' Training Corps Brigade
- 2nd Security Force Assistance Brigade
- 2nd Tank Destroyer Brigade
- 2nd Theater Signal Brigade
- 2nd Vermont Brigade

=== Combat Teams ===
- 2nd Brigade Combat Team, 1st Armored Division
- 2nd Brigade Combat Team, 1st Cavalry Division (United States)
- 2nd Brigade Combat Team, 1st Infantry Division
- 2nd Infantry Brigade Combat Team (Airborne), 11th Airborne Division
- 2nd Brigade Combat Team, 10th Mountain Division (United States)
- 2nd Infantry Brigade Combat Team, 28th Infantry Division
- 2nd Infantry Brigade Combat Team, 34th Infantry Division

== Yugoslavia ==
- 2nd Krajina Brigade

== Other ==
- 2nd Czechoslovak Paratrooper Brigade in the Soviet Union
- 2nd Romanija Motorized Brigade

== See also ==
- 2nd Division (disambiguation)
- 2nd Regiment (disambiguation)
