= B Division =

B Division, Division B, or variant may refer to:

- B Division (New York City Subway)
- B Division (Irish League), association football
- Division B (Scottish Football League)
- Divizia B (Romanian Football League)
- Moldovan "B" Division
- B-Division (Tuvalu)
- Division B (FIBA EuroBasket)
- Division B (Minor Hockey League), Russian ice hockey
- Homicide: Division B, a 2008 short film

== See also ==
- A Division (disambiguation)
- Second Division (disambiguation)
