= 2d Reconnaissance Squadron =

2d Reconnaissance Squadron may refer to:

- 92nd Air Refueling Squadron, designated '2d Reconnaissance Squadron (Heavy)' from November 1940 to April 1943
- 2nd Troop Carrier Squadron, designated '2d Reconnaissance Squadron, Long Range, Photographic' and '2d Reconnaissance Squadron, Very Long Range, Photographic' from June 1945 to March 1946, and '2d Reconnaissance Squadron, Photographic' from October 1947 to June 1949

== See also ==
- 2d Weather Reconnaissance Squadron
