= 2nd Light Mechanized Division =

- 2e division légère mécanique
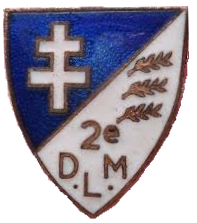
- Active: 1937 – 16 July 1940
- Country: France
- Type: Mechanized Infantry
- Size: Division
- Garrison/HQ: Lyon (1937); Melun (1939)
- Engagements: World War II: Battle of France

The 2nd Light Mechanized Division (French: 2e Division Légère Mécanique, 2e DLM) was a French Army division active during the Second World War. It was created in 1937.

== Second World War ==
=== Battle Of France ===
During the Battle of France in May 1940, the division contained the following units:

- 3rd Light Mechanized Brigade
  - 13th Dragoon Armoured Regiment
  - 29th Dragoon Armoured Regiment
- 4th Light Mechanized Brigade
  - 4th Dragoon Mechanized Infantry Regiment
  - 8th Cuirassier Reconnaissance Cavalry Regiment
- 71st Artillery Regiment
