= 2 Squadron =

2 Squadron may refer to:

== Air force units ==
- No. 2 Squadron RAAF, Australia
- No. 2 Security Forces Squadron RAAF, Australia
- No. 2 Squadron RCAF, Canada
- No. 2 Squadron IAF, India
- 2nd Squadron (Iraq)
- 2nd Squadron (JASDF), Japan
- No. 2 Squadron RJAF, Jordan
- No. 2 Squadron RNZAF, New Zealand
- No. 2 Squadron PAF, Pakistan
- 2 Squadron SAAF, South Africa
- No. 2 Squadron SLAF, Sri Lanka
- No. 2 Squadron RAF, United Kingdom
- No. 2 Squadron RFC, which became No. 2 Squadron RAF in 1918
- No. II Squadron RAF Regiment, United Kingdom
- 2d Airborne Command and Control Squadron, United States
- 2nd Airlift Squadron, United States
- 2nd Air Refueling Squadron, United States
- 2nd Air Rescue Squadron, United States
- 2nd Air Support Operations Squadron, United States
- 2d Aeromedical Evacuation Squadron, United States
- 2d Antisubmarine Squadron, United States
- 2nd Bombardment Squadron, United States
- 2d Command and Control Squadron, United States
- 2nd Fighter Squadron, United States
- 2d Fighter Squadron (Commando), United States
- 2d Reconnaissance Squadron (disambiguation), several units of the United States
- 2nd Space Launch Squadron, United States
- 2nd Space Operations Squadron, United States
- 2nd Special Operations Squadron, United States
- 2d Systems Operations Squadron, United States
- Air Warning Squadron 2, United States
- VF-2 (disambiguation), several units of the United States
- VFA-2 (Strike Fighter Squadron 2), United States
- VMAQ-2 (Marine Tactical Electronic Warfare Squadron 2), United States
- VMO-2 (Marine Observation Squadron 2), United States
- VP-2 (Patrol Squadron 2), United States
- VMUT-2 (Marine Unmanned Aerial Vehicle Training Squadron 2), United States

== Naval units ==
- 2nd Aircraft Carrier Squadron, United Kingdom
- 2nd Battle Squadron, United Kingdom
- 2nd Destroyer Squadron, United Kingdom
- 2nd Frigate Squadron (United Kingdom)
- 2nd Battlecruiser Squadron, United Kingdom
- Destroyer Squadron 2, United States
- Submarine Squadron 2, United States
