= 2nd Division =

2nd Division may refer to the following military units:

== Infantry divisions ==
- 2nd Division (Australia)
- 2nd Canadian Division
- 2nd Division (Colombia)
- 2nd Division (Continuation War), Finland
- 2nd Infantry Division (France)
- 2nd Moroccan Infantry Division (France)
- 2nd Division (Estonia) (1918–40)
- 2nd Division (German Empire) (1818–1919)
- 2nd Division (Reichswehr) (Germany, 1920–34)
- 2nd Infantry Division (Wehrmacht), Germany
- 2nd Marine Division (Wehrmacht), Germany
- 2nd Mountain Division (Wehrmacht), Germany
- 2nd Guards Infantry Division (German Empire)
- 2nd Flak Division, Germany
- 2nd Panzergrenadier Division, Germany
- 2nd Mechanized Infantry Division (Greece)
- 2nd (Rawalpindi) Division, British Indian Army before and during World War I
- 2nd Infantry Division (India)
- 2nd Division (Iraq) (1930s–2003; 2005–2014)
- 2nd Alpine Division "Tridentina", Kingdom of Italy
- 2nd CC.NN. Division "28 Ottobre", Kingdom of Italy
- 2nd Infantry Division "Sforzesca", Kingdom of Italy
- 2nd Division (Imperial Japanese Army)
- 2nd Guards Division (Imperial Japanese Army)
- 2nd Division (Japan) (1962–)
- 2nd New Zealand Division
- 2nd Division (Nigeria)
- 2nd Division (North Korea)
- 2nd Division (Norway)
- 2nd Infantry Division (Philippines)
- 2nd Legions Infantry Division (Poland)
- 2nd Lithuanian–Belarusian Division (Poland)
- 2nd Rifle Division (Poland)
- 2nd Division (Portugal) (1917–18)
- 2nd Infantry Division (South Africa)
- 2nd Infantry Division (South Korea)
- 2nd Division (South Vietnam) (1955–75)
- 2nd Guards Infantry Division (Russian Empire)
- 2nd Siberian Rifle Division
- 2nd Guards Motor Rifle Division
- 2nd Rifle Division (Soviet Union)
- 2nd Division (Spain)
- 2nd Infantry Division (Thailand), Queen's Guard
- 2nd (African) Division (United Kingdom)
- 2nd Infantry Division (United Kingdom)
- 2nd (London) Infantry Division
- 2nd Infantry Division (United States)
- 2nd Marine Division (United States)
- 2nd Infantry Division (Venezuela)
- 2nd Division (Vietnam)

== Airborne divisions ==
- 2nd Airborne Division (United Kingdom)
- 2nd Parachute Division (Germany)

== Cavalry divisions ==
- 2nd Light Cavalry Division (France)
- 2nd Cavalry Division (German Empire)
- 2nd Cavalry Division (Reichswehr), Weimar Republic
- 2nd Light Division (Wehrmacht), Germany
- 2nd Indian Cavalry Division, British Indian Army during World War I
- 2nd Cavalry Division Emanuele Filiberto Testa di Ferro, Italian Army during World War II
- 2nd Guards Cavalry Division (Russian Empire)
- 2nd Cavalry Division (United Kingdom)
- 2nd Mounted Division, United Kingdom
- 2/2nd Mounted Division, United Kingdom, later 3rd Mounted Division
- 2nd Cavalry Division (United States)

== Armoured divisions ==
- 2nd Armoured Division (Australia)
- 2nd Armored Division (France)
- 2nd Armored Division (Syria)
- 2nd Light Mechanized Division (France)
- 2nd Panzer Division (Wehrmacht), Germany
- 2nd Tank Division (Imperial Japanese Army)
- 2nd SS Panzer Division Das Reich
- 2nd Armoured Division (United Kingdom)
- 2nd Armored Division (United States)
- 2nd Guards Tank Division, Soviet Union
- 2nd Tank Division (Soviet Union)

== Naval divisions ==
- 2nd Carrier Division, Imperial Japanese Navy
- Carrier Division 2, United States Navy

== See also ==
- Division II (disambiguation)
- Segunda División (disambiguation) (Spanish: Second Division)
- Second Army (disambiguation)
- II Corps (disambiguation)
- 2nd Brigade (disambiguation)
- 2nd Regiment (disambiguation)
- 2 Squadron (disambiguation)
