= VFA-2 =

Strike Fighter Squadron Two
- Founded: 1 October 1972
- Country: United States
- Branch: United States Navy
- Type: Fighter/attack naval aviation squadron
- Role: Close air support Air interdiction Aerial reconnaissance
- Part of: Carrier Air Wing Two
- Garrison/HQ: NAS Lemoore
- Nickname: "Bounty Hunters"
- Colors: Red, white, blue, yellow
- Engagements: Operation Frequent Wind; Iranian Hostage Crisis; Operation Earnest Will; *Operation Nimble Archer; Gulf War; Operation Restore Hope; Operation Southern Watch; Operation Enduring Freedom; Iraq War; Operation Unified Assistance; Operation Prosperity Guardian; Operation Poseidon Archer
- Decorations: Battle Efficiency "E"

Insignia
- Call sign: Bullet

Aircraft flown
- Fighter: F-14 Tomcat; F/A-18F Super Hornet

Strike Fighter Squadron 2 (VFA-2) also known as the "Bounty Hunters" is a United States Navy F/A-18F Super Hornet strike fighter squadron based at Naval Air Station Lemoore, California. Their tail code is NE and their callsign is "Bullet". They are attached to Carrier Air Wing 2 (CVW-2), a composite unit made up of a wide array of aircraft performing a variety of combat and support missions that deploy aboard the Carl Vinson.

== History ==
Four distinct squadrons have been designated VF-2. Officially, the US Navy does not recognize a direct lineage with disestablished squadrons if a new squadron is formed with the same designation. Often, the new squadron will assume the nickname, insignia, and traditions of the earlier squadrons.

=== 1970s ===
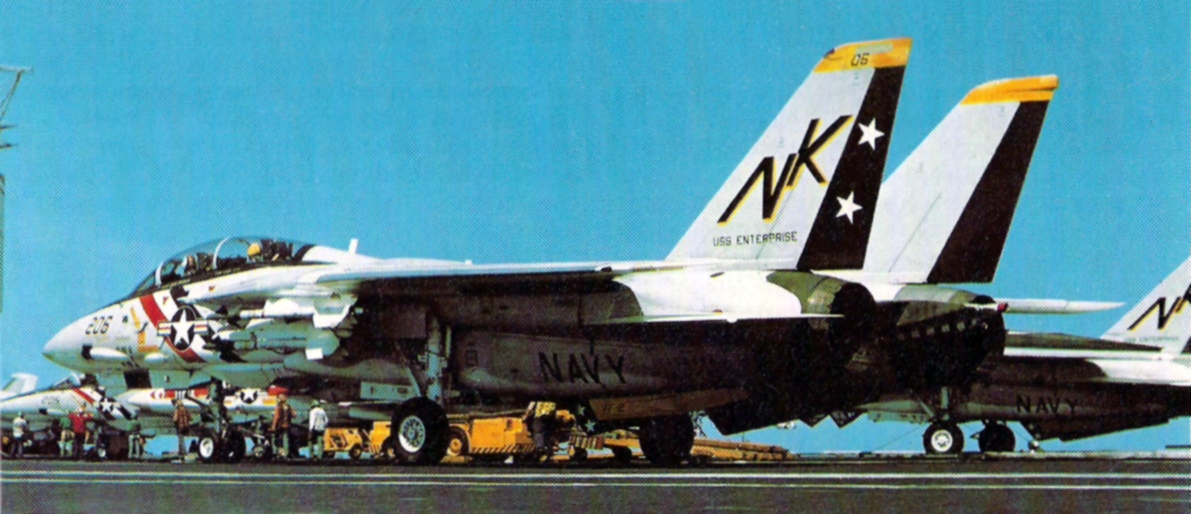
VF-2 F-14As aboard USS Enterprise during their first deployment, 1975

VF-2, known as the "Bounty Hunters," was established on 14 October 1972 flying the F-14A Tomcat. VF-2 completed aircrew training and received its first Tomcats in July 1973, attaining full strength of 12 F-14As in the spring of 1974.

VF-2's initial deployment was in 1974 with her sister squadron VF-1 aboard USS Enterprise. The squadron flew over Saigon in support of Operation Frequent Wind, the evacuation of US personnel in April, 1975. Deployed on USS Enterprise Westpac 1978 Ports of call: Pearl Harbor Hawaii, Subic Bay Philippines, Singapore, Perth Australia, Hong Kong

=== 1980s ===
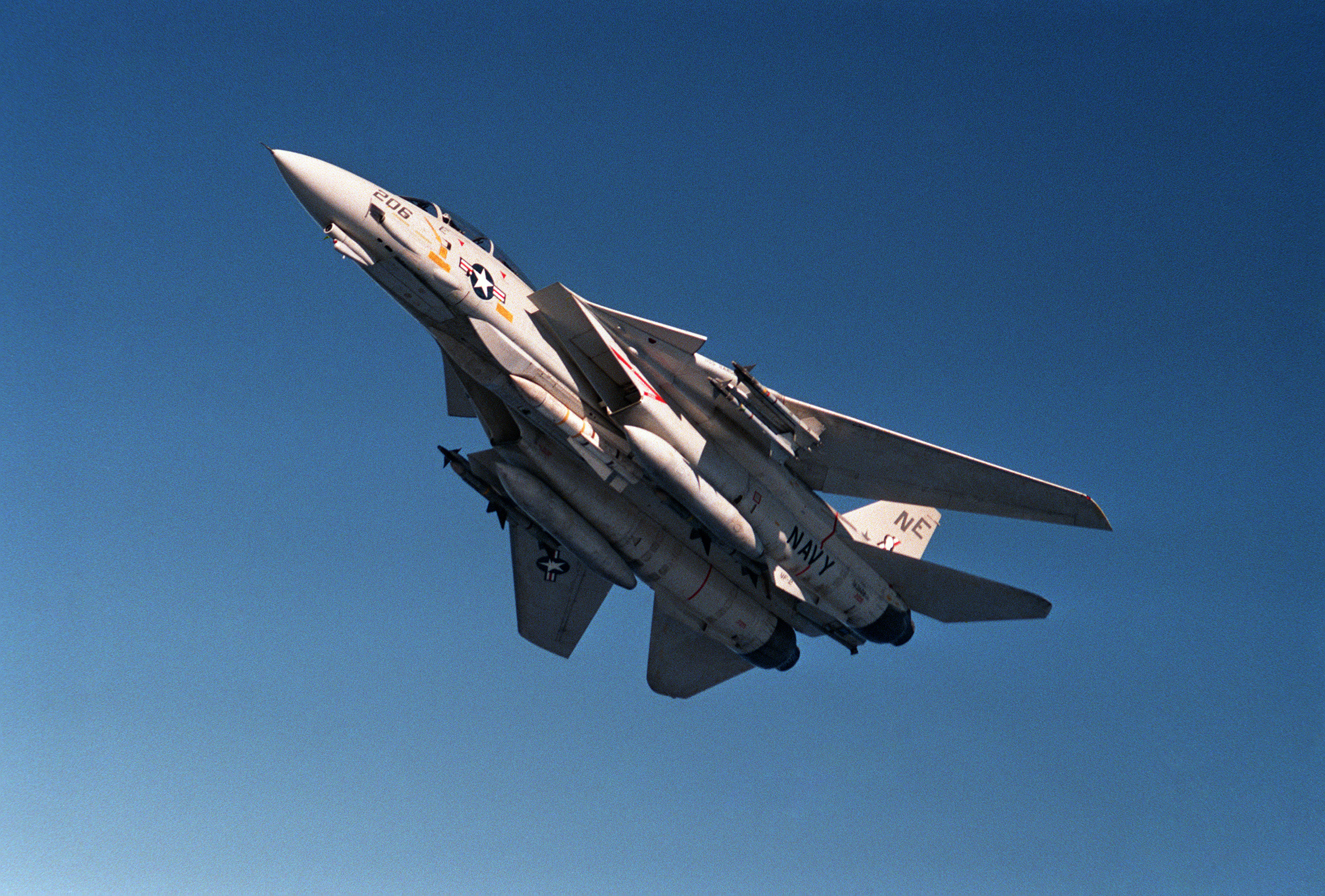
VF-2 F-14A equipped with AIM-9 Sidewinder, AIM-7 Sparrow and AIM-54 Phoenix air-to-air missiles, 1988

VF-2 was assigned to USS Ranger for the September 1980 deployment, 4 months of which were spent in the Indian Ocean and Persian Gulf during the Iran hostage crisis.

The squadron was the first Tactical Air Reconnaissance Pod System (TARPS) unit for both CVW-14 and later CVW-2.

VF-2 deployed aboard USS Kitty Hawk in 1984 In March 1984, Kitty Hawk participated in "Team Spirit" exercises in the Sea of Japan. The Soviet Victor-class nuclear attack submarine K-314 shadowed the task group. On 21 March, at the conclusion of the Sea of Japan part of the exercise, K-314 surfaced directly in front of Kitty Hawk, and at 22:05 hrs, too dark and far too close for Kitty Hawk to see and avoid the resulting collision, the vessels came in contact, resulting in minor damage to the carrier, and significant damage to the Soviet submarine. Kitty Hawk reported to the U.S. Naval Base at Subic Bay in the Philippines for repairs. A piece of one of K-314's propellers was embedded in Kitty Hawk's bow, as were some chunks of the Soviet anechoic coating, from scraping along the side of the sub. On 2 June 1984, VF-2 became the first squadron to launch an F-14 from an aircraft carrier while towing an air-to-air gunnery target. In 1987, the squadron logged Ranger’s 260,000th landing. The carrier returned to San Diego on 1 August 1984 and VF-2 returned for multiple Ranger deployments throughout the 1980s.

Following that cruise, VF-2 and CVW-2 returned to USS Ranger for her remaining five deployments. In 1987, CVW-2 was largely composed of Grumman aircraft. The "Grumman Air Wing" deployed to the Western Pacific/Indian Ocean in July 1987, flying many "Earnest Will" escort missions into the Persian Gulf. On 19 October 1987, Ranger took part in Operation Nimble Archer, an attack on two Iranian oil platforms in the Persian Gulf by US Navy forces.

=== 1990s ===
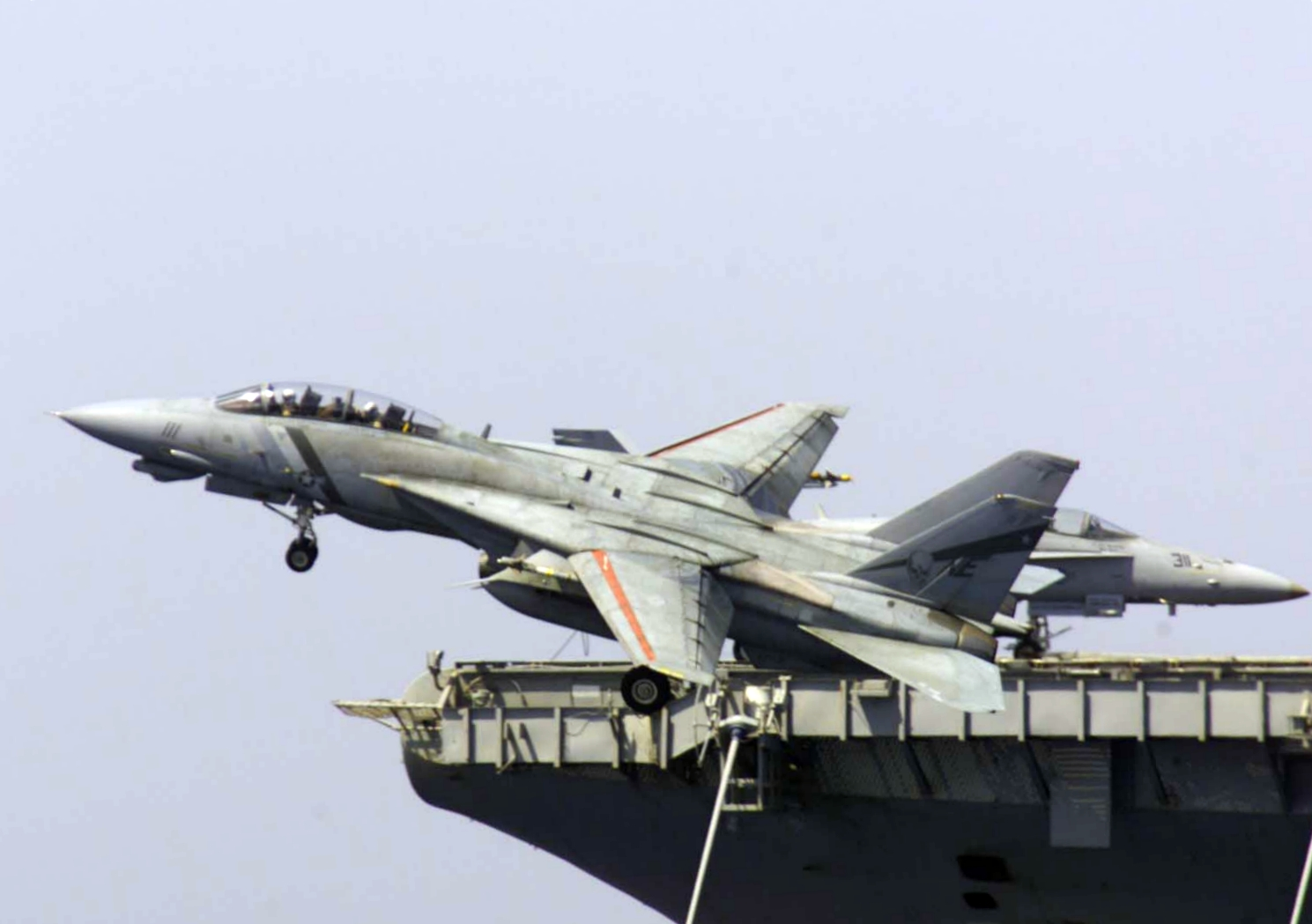
F-14D Tomcat from VF-2 passing the bow of the aircraft carrier USS Constellation after having been launched from one of the waist catapults

The unit participated in Operation Desert Storm, flying over 500 combat mission from USS Ranger operating in the Persian Gulf. VF-2 performed escort, reconnaissance and Combat Air Patrol (CAP) missions. In 1992, after taking in Operation Southern Watch, CVW-2 sailed to Somalia becoming the first Air Wing to take part in Operation Restore Hope, providing air cover, photo and visual reconnaissance, airborne air traffic control, logistics support, and on-call close air support for U.S. Navy and Marine Corps amphibious forces alongside its sister squadron VF-1. After the 1992-1993 cruise, USS Ranger was decommissioned (along with VF-2’s sister squadron VF-1), and VF-2 was switched to the USS Constellation. At the same time, VF-2 transitioned to the F-14D Tomcat. Several months after the 1995 cruise, VF-2 was awarded the battle "E" and relocated from NAS Miramar to NAS Oceana due to a Base Realignment and Closure (BRAC) decision to make Miramar a Marine Corps Air Station.

In April 1996, VF-2's F-14Ds were modified to carry the LANTIRN infrared targeting pod, giving them precision strike capabilities.

During their 1999 cruise, VF-2 supported Operation Southern Watch and on 9 September, attacked Surface-to-Air Missile sites and anti-aircraft guns around Basra. The same day, a VF-2 Tomcat engaged 2 Iraqi Air Force MiG-23’s that were heading south into the No-Fly Zone from Al-Taqaddum Air Base, west of Baghdad with AIM-54 Phoenixes. The missiles did not score as the MiGs turned north once they detected the missile launch.

=== 2000s ===
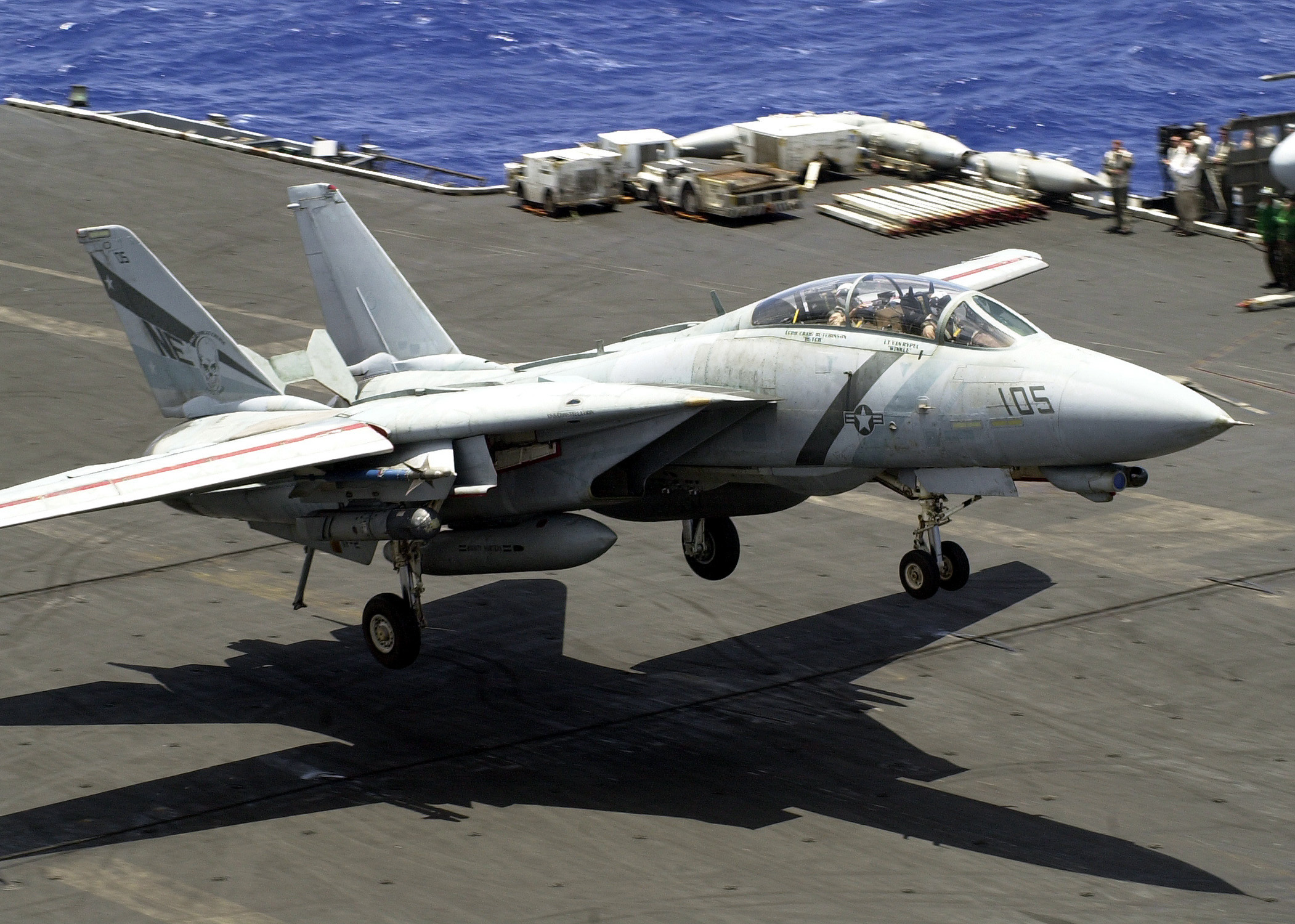
VF-2 F-14D landing aboard USS Constellation, in 2003

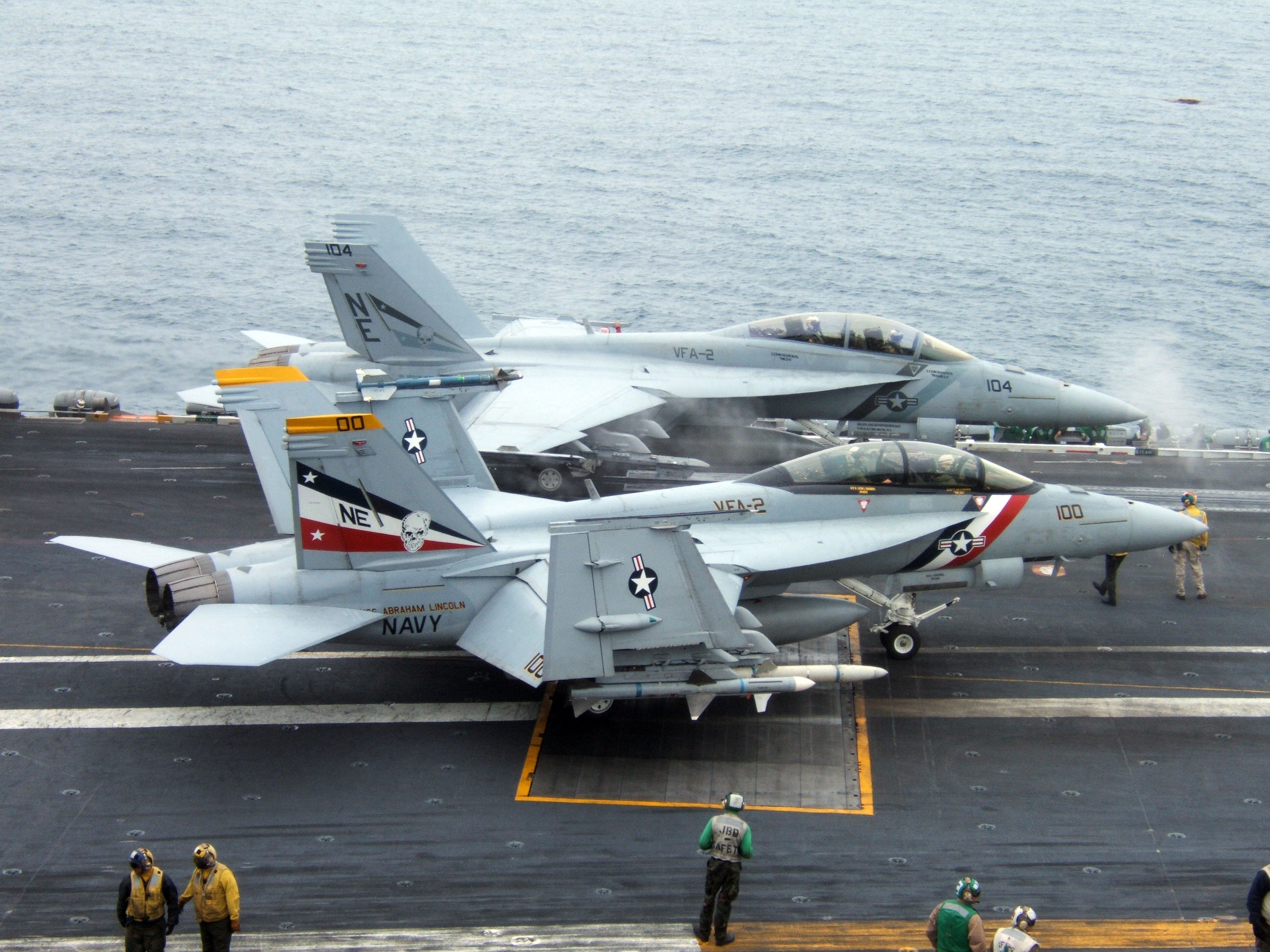
VFA-2 F/A-18Fs aboard USS Abraham Lincoln, in 2005

In mid 2001, VF-2 deployed aboard USS Constellation in support of Operation Southern Watch.

During the 2002-2003 deployment, the final cruise with the Tomcat, VF-2 participated in Operation Iraqi Freedom flying a wide range of missions including reconnaissance, close air support, CAP and strike missions. On 28 February 2003, during Operation Southern Watch, a VF-2 aircraft delivered the 1st Tomcat JDAM in combat. During this deployment, VF-2 flew 483 sorties and dropped 294 Laser-guided bomb's/JDAMs/MK-82 bombs.

On 1 July 2003, VF-2 was redesignated VFA-2, and began transition to the F/A-18F Super Hornet receiving its first aircraft on 6 October 2003.

VFA-2 deployed to the Western Pacific aboard USS Abraham Lincoln with CVW-2 in October, 2004. They returned in March 2005 after supporting Operation Unified Assistance which provided humanitarian support to Southeast Asia after the 2004 Indian Ocean tsunami.

In 2006, VFA-2 and CVW-2 embarked on a WESTPAC deployment.

On 13 March 2008, VFA-2 embarked with CVW-2 aboard USS Abraham Lincoln on a 7-month deployment to the Persian Gulf, returning home on 8 October.

=== 2010s ===
Between 24 and 31 March 2006, during Foal Eagle 2006 exercises, strike squadrons VFA-2, VFA-34, VFA-137, and VFA-151 teamed with U.S. Air Force aircraft from the 18th Wing based at Kadena Air Base to provide combat air patrols and coordinated bombing runs via the exercise's Combined Air Operations Center.

On 11 September 2010, VFA-2 deployed with CVW-2 aboard USS Abraham Lincoln to the Arabian Sea and Persian Gulf.

The squadron has transitioned to newer Block II F/A-18F Super Hornet equipped with the AESA radar.

=== 2020s ===
The squadrons former Commanding Officer, CDR Timmester(RET), was the last navy squadron commander to have flown in the F-14 Tomcat. VFA-2 is currently assigned to Carrier Air Wing 2 on the USS Carl Vinson.

In mid November 2024, VFA-2 and their F/A-18Fs departed the US as part of CVW-2 on a scheduled deployment aboard the USS Carl Vinson

Following multiple exercises with Pacific Rim militaries, VFA-2 and CVW-2 were ordered to operate in the Red Sea in defense of international shipping lanes and Israel against Houthi/Iran proxy military unit attacks from Yemen.

VFA-2 and CVW-2 arrived in the CENTCOM AOR in early April 2025 with extensive combat operations against the Houthis/Iranians commencing upon arrival to the region.

== See also ==
- Naval aviation
- Military aviation
- List of United States Navy aircraft squadrons
- List of Inactive United States Navy aircraft squadrons
- VF-2 (1927–1942)
- VF-2 (1943–1945)
