= 2nd Regiment =

2nd Regiment may refer to:

== Active units ==
=== British Army ===
- 2nd Royal Tank Regiment

=== United States ===
- 2nd Aviation Regiment (United States)
- 2nd Air Defense Artillery Regiment
- 2nd Cavalry Regiment (United States)
- 2nd Marine Regiment (United States)
- 2nd Infantry Regiment (United States)
- 2nd Field Artillery Regiment (United States)

=== Australian Army ===
- 2nd Cavalry Regiment (Australia) - armoured reconnaissance unit
- 2nd/14th Light Horse Regiment - armoured reconnaissance unit
- 2nd/10th Medium Regiment, Royal Australian Artillery

=== French Army ===
- 2nd Combat Helicopter Regiment
- 2nd Foreign Engineer Regiment - French Foreign Legion Combat engineering unit
- 2nd Foreign Parachute Regiment - French Foreign Legion airborne commando unit
- 2nd Marine Infantry Parachute Regiment - airborne unit
- 2nd Foreign Infantry Regiment - French Foreign Legion unit

=== Belgian Army ===
- 2nd/4th Regiment Mounted Rifles - armoured reconnaissance unit
- 2nd/4th Lancers Regiment - tank unit
- 2nd Field Artillery Regiment/Field Artillery Battery ParaCommando

=== Italian Army ===
- 2nd Alpini Regiment
- 2nd Alpine Signal Regiment
- 2nd Alpine Engineer Regiment
- 2nd Alpine Artillery Regiment
- 2nd Army Aviation Support Regiment "Orione"
- 2nd Army Aviation Regiment "Sirio"

=== Canadian Army ===
- 2nd Field Regiment, Royal Canadian Artillery

=== Portuguese Army ===
- 2nd Lancers Regiment - Portuguese army military police unit

== Former units ==
- 2nd Infantry Regiment (Lithuania) - Lithuanian interwar infantry regiment
- 2nd Infantry Regiment (South Korea) - Korean War unit
- 2nd Guards Field Artillery - Imperial German Army World War I unit
- 2/6th Cavalry Commando Regiment (Australia) - World War II unit
- 2nd Regiment of Light Cavalry Lancers of the Imperial Guard (the "Red Lancers" - a Napoleonic French unit, originally raised as the Guard Hussars of the Kingdom of Holland

=== Polish Army ===
- 2nd Armoured Regiment (Poland) - Polish army World War II unit
- 2nd Legions' Infantry Regiment
- 2nd Infantry Regiment (Duchy of Warsaw)

=== British Army ===
- 2nd East Anglian Regiment - Short lived British army unit
- 64th (2nd Staffordshire) Regiment of Foot - British army
- 2nd Tangier Regiment - British Army
- 65th (2nd Yorkshire, North Riding) Regiment of Foot - British army

=== British Indian Army ===
- 2nd Punjab Regiment - British Indian army unit
- 2nd Queen Victoria's Own Rajput Light Infantry - British Indian army

=== Yugoslavia ===
- 2nd Yugoslav Assault Regiment - Yugoslav Air Force World War II unit
- 2nd Training Aviation Regiment - Yugoslav Air Force post-World War II unit

=== Greek Army ===
- 2nd Serres Regiment, Greek army
- 2/21 Cretan Regiment, Greek army
- 2/39 Evzone Regiment, Greek army

=== American Civil War units ===
==== Union Army ====
- 2nd United States Infantry Regiment (Civil War)
- 2nd United States Volunteer Sharpshooter Regiment
- 2nd Alabama Volunteer Infantry Regiment (African Descent)
- 2nd Regiment Illinois Volunteer Cavalry
- 2nd Regiment Indiana Cavalry
- 2nd Iowa Regiment
- 2nd Regiment Iowa Volunteer Cavalry
- 2nd Regiment Kansas Volunteer Infantry (African Descent)
- 2nd Kentucky Infantry Regiment
- 2nd Maine Volunteer Infantry Regiment
- 2nd Maryland Infantry Regiment, several units
- 2nd Regiment of Cavalry, Massachusetts Volunteers
- 2nd Regiment Massachusetts Volunteer Heavy Artillery
- 2nd Regiment Massachusetts Volunteer Infantry
- 2nd Michigan Volunteer Cavalry Regiment
- 2nd Michigan Volunteer Infantry Regiment
- 2nd Minnesota Volunteer Cavalry Regiment
- 2nd Nebraska Cavalry
- 2nd New Hampshire Volunteer Regiment
- 2nd New York Volunteer Infantry Regiment
- 2nd Ohio Infantry
- 2nd Regiment South Carolina Volunteer Infantry (African Descent)
- 2nd West Virginia Veteran Volunteer Infantry Regiment
- 2nd West Virginia Volunteer Cavalry Regiment
- 2nd West Virginia Volunteer Infantry Regiment
- 2nd Wisconsin Volunteer Infantry Regiment
- 2nd Regiment Wisconsin Volunteer Cavalry

==== Confederate Army ====
- 2nd Regiment Alabama Volunteer Cavalry (Confederate)
- 2nd Kentucky Infantry
- 2nd Infantry (2nd Palmetto Regiment)
- 2nd Maryland Infantry Regiment
- 2nd Virginia Infantry

=== American Revolutionary War units ===
- 2nd Canadian Regiment
- 2nd Connecticut Regiment
- 2nd Georgia Regiment
- 2nd Maryland Regiment
- 2nd Massachusetts Regiment
- 2nd New Hampshire Regiment
- 2nd New Jersey Regiment
- 2nd New York Regiment
- 2nd North Carolina Regiment
- 2nd Pennsylvania Regiment
- 2nd Rhode Island Regiment
- 2nd South Carolina Regiment
- 2nd Virginia Regiment
- 2nd Albany County Militia Regiment

=== Spanish–American War units ===
- 2nd Oregon Volunteer Infantry Regiment
- 2nd Virginia Volunteer Infantry (1898)

== Others ==
- Nevers' 2nd Regiment Band

== See also ==
- Second Division (disambiguation)
