= List of monuments and memorials to Wojtek =

Monuments to a World War II brown bear

Wojtek was a Syrian brown bear. He was purchased (accounts differ) by Polish soldiers from an Iranian shepherd near Hamadan, Iran, during World War II. Wojtek accompanied the 2nd Polish Corps to Italy, serving under the 22nd Artillery Supply Company.

In 1944, during the Battle of Monte Cassino, Wojtek is said to have imitated his human comrades, carrying ammunition crates. He was promoted from private to corporal and became a celebrity with visiting Allied generals and statesmen. After the war, he was mustered out of the Polish Army and lived out the rest of his life in Scotland at the Edinburgh Zoo. Since his death in 1963, he has been depicted in various memorials and works of art in the United Kingdom, Poland, and Italy.

Monuments to Wojtek
Image	Location	Artist	Installation date	Details	Refs.
	Polish Institute and Sikorski Museum, London, England	David Harding	1972; 54 years ago	The first statue of Wojtek was initially located in a restaurant within a hotel near the Edinburgh Zoo and was moved to the Polish Institute and Sikorski Museum in London in 1985.	
	Polish Village, RAF Penrhos, Wales	Stanisław Gieszczykiewicz-Jaroń	2004; 22 years ago	A wooden sculpture of Wojtek was located in Polish Village, a nursing home for elderly Poles that was located on the former site of a Royal Air Force base. The sculpture had been taken to the nursing home in 2004 by its owner, Stanisław Gieszczykiewicz-Jaroń, and it stood outside of his former apartment. By 2019, the sculpture was in poor condition and had begun to rot.	
	Redbraes Place, Edinburgh, Scotland		November 14, 2010; 15 years ago	A bronze plaque depicting Wojtek is located at the Polish War Memorial in Redbraes Place.	
	Weelsby Woods, Grimsby, England		October 28, 2011; 14 years ago	A life-sized wooden statue of Wojtek was installed in Weelsby Woods in Grimsby in 2011. It was installed to commemorate Polish soldiers that settled in Grimsby after the end of World War II because they could not return to Poland due to the Russian occupation. The statue was funded by the Anglo Polish Society.	
	Żagań, Poland	Wioletta Sosnowska and Stanisław Grzesiowski	June 7, 2013; 13 years ago	The monument in Żagań was the first monument to Wojtek in Poland. It was designed by Wioletta Sosnowska and made by Stanisław Grzesiowski. The monument was unveiled by Wojciech Narębski, the last living member of the 22nd Artillery Supply Company.	
	Szymbark, Pomeranian Voivodeship, Poland	Izyda Srzednicka-Sulkowska	September 17, 2013; 12 years ago	The life-sized statue in Szymbark is located in the Centrum Edukacji i Promocji Regionu w Szymbarku. Former Polish president Lech Wałęsa was an official guest at the unveiling.	
	Henryk Jordan Park, Kraków, Poland	Wojciech Batka	May 18, 2014; 12 years ago	The statue in Kraków was unveiled in Henryk Jordan Park during the celebrations of the 70th anniversary of the capture of the Monte Cassino monastery. Wojtek's paw points in the direction of a statue of Władysław Anders.	
	Imola, Italy	Luigi Enzo Mattei	April 19, 2015; 11 years ago	The statue of Wojtek in Imola was the first monument to Wojtek in Italy. It was installed on the 70th anniversary of the liberation of Imola by the 2nd Polish Corps. It is at the entrance to the town.	
	Princes Street Gardens, Edinburgh, Scotland	Allan Beattie Herriot	November 7, 2015; 10 years ago	The project was set up by the Wojtek Memorial Trust. It was unveiled by author Aileen Orr, and the unveiling was attended by Polish diplomat Witold Sobków, Lord Provost of Edinburgh Donald Wilson, Cabinet Secretary Fiona Hyslop, and others.	
	Duns, Scottish Borders, Scotland	Wioletta Sosnowska and Stanisław Grzesiowski	April 24, 2016; 10 years ago	The statue of Wojtek in Duns was a gift from the Polish city of Żagań to commemorate their relations as twin cities. It is identical to the statue of Wojtek in Żagań.	
	Siewierska Street, Warsaw, Poland		May 30, 2017; 9 years ago	A statue of Wojtek in Warsaw was presented to a kindergarten on Siewierska Street, called Wojtek the Bear Kindergarten no. 99.	
	Poznań New Zoo, Poznań, Poland	Mariusz Jaśkowski	September 30, 2018; 7 years ago	A wooden statue of Wojtek was installed at the Poznań New Zoo to commemorate its bear sanctuary. It was donated by Krystyna Wieczorek, a writer of a book about Wojtek.	
	Piazza XV Febbraio, Cassino, Italy		May 15, 2019; 7 years ago	The statue of Wojtek in Cassino is made of marble mined in Coreno Ausonio. It stands in Piazza XV Febbraio and has a plaque written in Italian, Polish, and English. The unveiling ceremony was attended by Polish ambassador Anna Maria Anders and representatives of the Polish embassy.	
	Wojtek the Bear Square, Szczecin, Poland	Bohdan Ronin-Walknowski	May 23, 2019; 7 years ago	The statue of Wojtek in Szczecin was designed to allow children to sit on its back. It weighs 400 kg.	
	Bohaterów Monte Cassino Street, Sopot, Poland	Paweł Sasin	September 1, 2019; 6 years ago	The statue of Wojtek in Sopot was proposed by Ewa Rakowska-Eggar, a tourist guide based in London. She created two organizations to help collect the necessary funds, the Foundation for the Construction of the Wojtek the Bear Monument, based in Sopot, and Wojtek the Bear Friends Club, based in London. The sculpture was designed by Paweł Sasin, and unveiled on 1 September 2019, on the 80th anniversary of the outbreak of World War II.	
	Anders Park, Wrocław, Poland		September 13, 2020; 5 years ago	A miniature statue of Wojtek wrestling with a Wrocław Dwarf is located in Anders Park.	
	Konwiktorska Street, Warsaw, Poland		September 1, 2021; 4 years ago	At the start of the 2021 school year, a wooden statue of Wojtek was unveiled at the LXII Liceum Ogólnokształcące Mistrzostwa Sportowego im. Gen. Broni Władysława Andersa w Warszawie, a primary school on Konwiktorska Street. The school is dedicated to Władysław Anders.	
	Venafro, Italy		May 17, 2022; 4 years ago	A mural and relief sculpture in Venafro commemorate Wojtek and the 22nd Artillery Supply Company. The monument was created by the Winterline – Venafro Luciano Bucci association and the Lello Castaldi Center for Political Studies. It is located where the 22nd Artillery Supply Company was encamped during the battle of Monte Cassino.	

== See also ==
- List of individual bears
