= Danuta Siedzikówna "Inka" Memorial (Warsaw) =

Monument in Warsaw, Poland

- Interactive map of Danuta Siedzikówna "Inka" Memorial
- Location: 73 and 75 Bema Street, Wola, Warsaw, Poland
- Coordinates: 52.227414°N 20.958265°E
- Designer: Leszek Kruczek
- Type: Bust
- Opening date: 3 October 2015
- Dedicated to: Danuta Siedzikówna

The Danuta Siedzikówna "Inka" Memorial (Polish: Pomnik Danuty Siedzikówny „Inki”) is a bust in Warsaw, Poland, placed next to the St. Stanislaus Bishop and Martyr Church at 73 and 75 Bema Street in the district of Wola. It is dedicated to Danuta Siedzikówna, allias "Inka", a medical orderly of the Home Army during the Second World War, and later in the anti-communist resistance, until being captured and executed at the age of 17 in 1946. It was designed by Leszek Kruczek and unveiled on 3 October 2015. The monument is a copy of a sculpture in Kraków, Poland.

== History ==
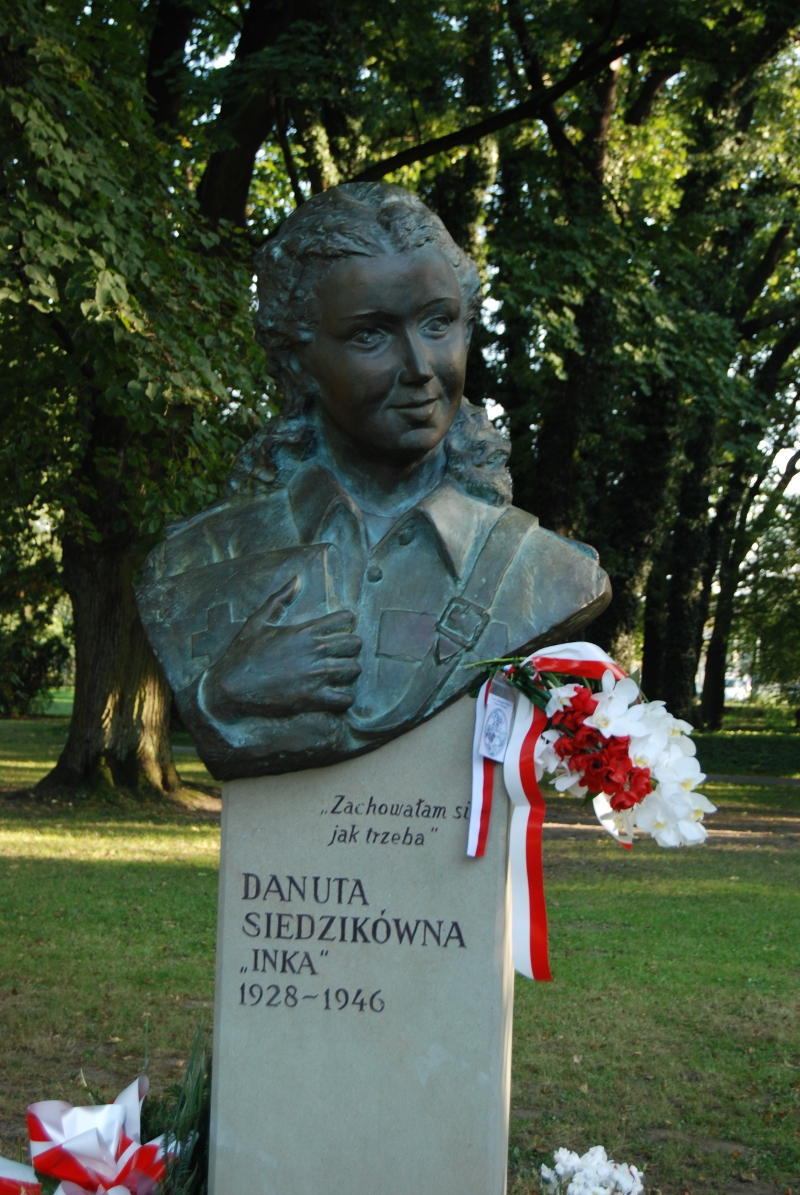
The original sculpture in Jordan Park in Kraków.

The sculpture a copy of a monument located in Kraków, within the Jordan Park. The original sculpture was designed by Leszek Kruczek, and unveiled on 16 September 2012. The replica was unveiled in Warsaw on 3 October 2015, next to the St. Stanislaus Bishop and Martyr Church. It is dedicated to Danuta Siedzikówna, allias "Inka", a medical orderly of the Home Army during the Second World War, and later in the anti-communist resistance, until being captured and executed at the age of 17 in 1946.

== Design ==
The monument consists of a bust of Danuta Siedzikówna, depicted in military jacket and holding a nurse bag to her chest. It is placed on a pedestal, which features an inscription which reads "Danuta Siedzikówna 'Inka'; 1928–1946" as well as a Polish quote "Zachowałam się jak trzeba", which translates "I have acted right". It was part of letter written by her a few days before her execution, in which she said "Please tell my grandmother, that I have acted right".
