= Kingwood Historic District =

Historic district in West Virginia, United States

- U.S. National Register of Historic Places
- U.S. Historic district
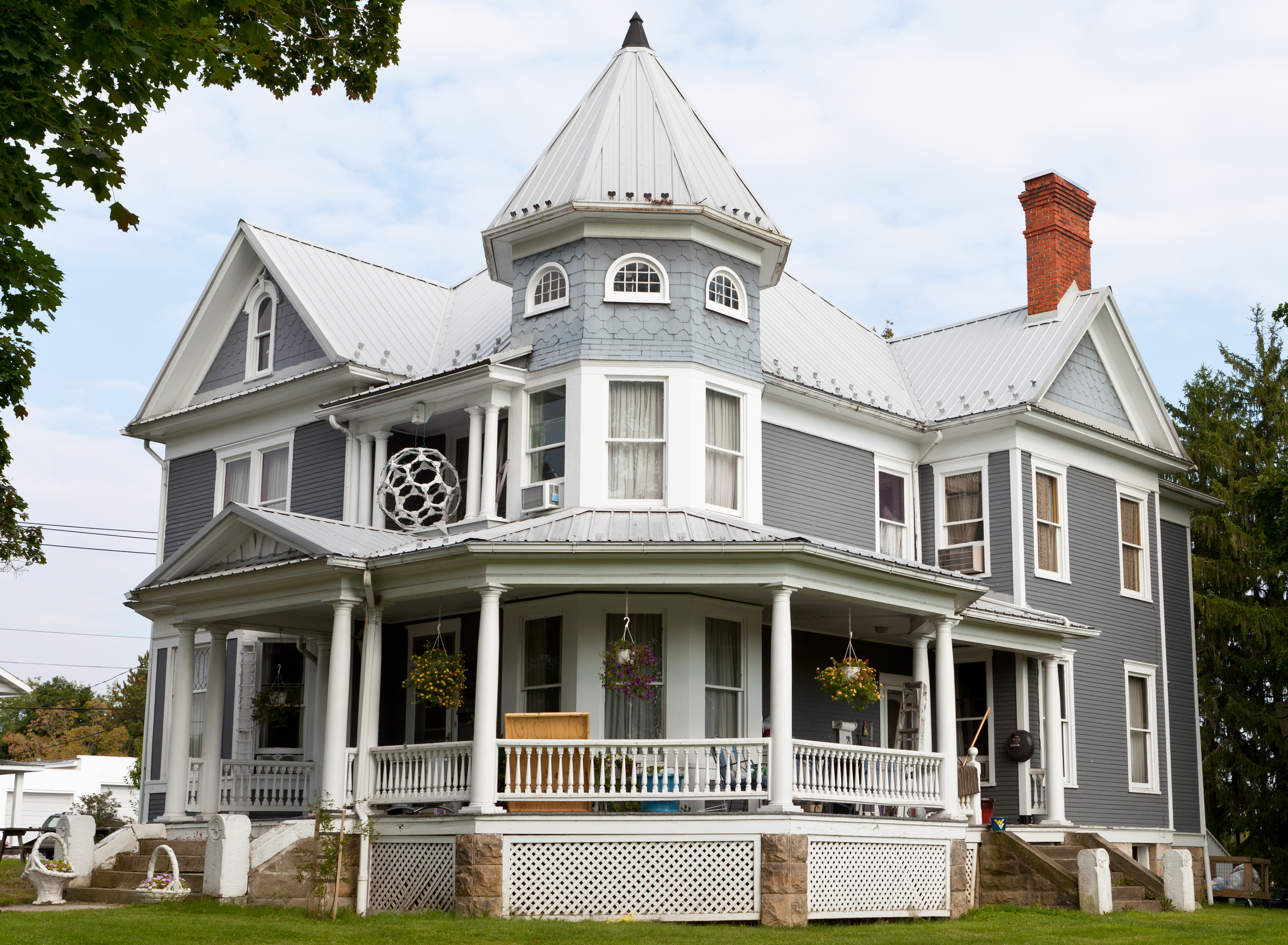
- The c. 1895 Dr. Rudisell House on East High Street

- Location within West Virginia Location within the United States
- Location: Roughly bounded by Tunnelton, Main, Sigler, High and Price Sts. and Brown Ave., Kingwood, West Virginia
- Coordinates: 39°28′13″N 79°41′14″W
- Area: 8 acres (3.2 ha)
- Built: 1859
- Architect: Richard M. Bates, Jr.; Stanton M. Howard; Milburn, Heisner & Company; Carl Reger
- Architectural style: Mid 19th Century Revival, Late Victorian, Late 19th And 20th Century Revivals
- NRHP reference No.: 94000723
- Added to NRHP: July 15, 1994

Kingwood Historic District is a national historic district located at Kingwood, Preston County, West Virginia. The district encompasses 103 contributing buildings in the central business district and surrounding residential areas of Kingwood. Most of the buildings are two story, frame and masonry buildings. Notable buildings include the Preston County Courthouse (1934), Kingwood National Bank Building (1908), C.M. Bishop House (1872), Preston Academy (1842), IOOF Lodge (c. 1860), Bank of Kingwood (1900), Bishop Block (1877), Presbyterian Church (1878), Methodist Church (1879), Wilson Building (1930), and Loar's Service Station (1927). Located in the district and listed separately is the James Clark McGrew House.

Architects whose work is represented in the district include Stanton M. Howard of Wheeling for his Methodist Church, Milburn, Heister & Company of Washington, DC for their Bank of Kingwood Building, Carl Reger of Morgantown's Preston County Jail, and Richard M. Bates, Jr. of Huntington, who designed the former Central Preston High School.

It was listed on the National Register of Historic Places in 1994.
