= History of West Virginia University =

West Virginia University's first president, Rev. Alexander Martin. He was a Methodist minister from Scotland who served from the founding of the school in 1867 until 1875.

West Virginia University is a public research university in Morgantown, West Virginia, United States. Founded as an agricultural college, WVU has developed into a major research university with an emphasis in neurosciences, forensics, and biometrics.

== Early history ==
An early image of WVU's Cadet Corps circa 1880. In the background: (center) Martin Hall, the first University building, (right) the predecessor to Woodburn Hall, and (left) the Agricultural Station replaced by Oglebay Hall in 1917.

=== Founding the university ===
Under the terms of the 1862 Morrill Land-Grant Colleges Act, the West Virginia Legislature created the Agricultural College of West Virginia on February 7, 1867, and the school officially opened on September 2 of the same year. On December 4, 1868, lawmakers renamed the college West Virginia University to represent a broader range of higher education. The university was built on the grounds of three former academies, namely the Monongalia Academy of 1814, the Morgantown Female Academy of 1831, and Woodburn Female Seminary of 1858. Upon its founding, the local newspaper claimed that "a place more eligible for the quiet and successful pursuit of science and literature is nowhere to be found."

The first campus building was constructed in 1870 as University Hall, and was renamed Martin Hall in 1889 in honor of West Virginia University's first president, the Rev. Alexander Martin of Scotland. After the Woodburn Seminary building was destroyed by fire in 1873, the centerpiece of what is now Woodburn Hall was completed in 1876, under the name New Hall. The name was changed to University Building in 1878, when the College of Law was founded as the first professional school in the state of West Virginia. The precursor to Woodburn Circle was finished in 1893 when Chitwood Hall (then Science Hall) was constructed on the bluff's north side. Around the start of the 20th century, a north wing was added to University Building, and the facility was renamed Woodburn Hall. Throughout the next decade, Woodburn Hall underwent several renovations and additions, including the construction of the south wing and east tower housing the iconic Seth Thomas clock.

WVU was required to have a Cadet Corps under the terms of the Morrill Act of 1862. The United States War Department offered military equipment to the university at no charge, forming the basis of the school's Military Tactics department. The heavy military influence led to opposition to female enrollment that lasted through the first decade of the university. The trend changed in 1889, when ten women were allowed to enroll and seek degrees at the university. In June 1891, Harriet Lyon became the first woman to receive a degree from West Virginia University, finishing first in the class ahead of all male students. Lyon's academic success supported the acceptance of women in the university as students and educators.

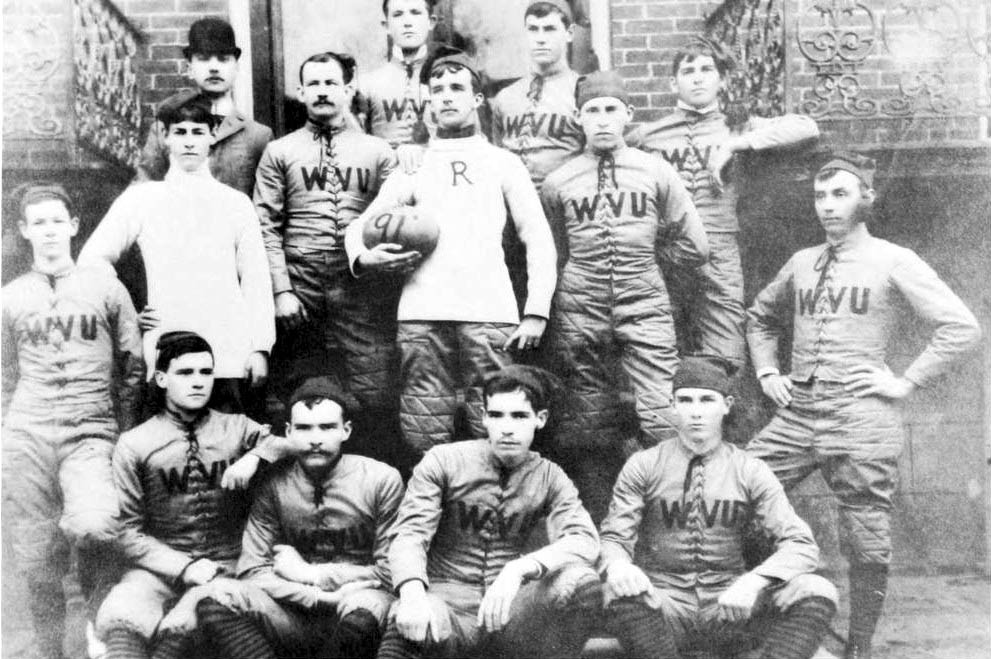
West Virginia University's first football team, formed in 1891.

During the University's early years, daily chapel services and roll call for all students were mandatory, limiting time for student recreation. Following the removal of these obligations, students became active in extracurricular activities and established many of the school's first athletic and student organizations. The first edition of the student newspaper known as the Athenaeum, now The Daily Athenaeum, was published in 1887, and the West Virginia Law Review became the fourth oldest law review in the United States when it was founded in 1894. Kappa Delta, the first sorority at WVU, was established in 1899. The first football team was formed in 1891, and the first basketball team appeared in 1903.

=== Early 20th century ===
Boyd "Slim" Arnold, the first Mountaineer mascot to don the traditional buckskin uniform. His selection in 1937 marked the beginning of an official process to name the mascot annually.

The university's outlook around the start of the 20th century was optimistic, as the school constructed the first library in present-day Stewart Hall during 1902, and welcomed U.S. President William Taft to the campus for the inauguration of University President Thomas Hodges in 1911. However, the University's efforts to attract more qualified educators, increase enrollment, and expand the campus was hindered during a period that saw two World Wars and the Great Depression. With a heavy military influence in the university, many students left college to join the army during World War I, and the local ROTC was organized in 1916. Women's involvement in the war efforts at home led to the creation of Women's Hall dormitory, now Stalnaker Hall, in 1918.

Despite the wartime struggles, the University was able to establish the disciplines of biology, medicine, journalism, pharmacy, and the first mining program in the nation. In 1918, Oglebay Hall was built to house the expanded agriculture and forestry programs. Additionally, the first dedicated sports facilities were constructed including "The Ark" for basketball in 1918, and the original Mountaineer Field in 1925. Stansbury Hall was built in 1928 and included a new basketball arena named "The Fieldhouse" that held 6,000 spectators. The Mountaineer mascot was adopted during the late 1920s, with an unofficial process to select the Mountaineer through 1936. An official selection process began naming the mascot annually in 1937, with Boyd "Slim" Arnold becoming the first Mountaineer to wear the buckskin uniform.

As male students left for World War II in 1939, women became more prominent in the university and surpassed the number of males on campus for the first time in 1943. Soldiers returning from the war qualified for the G.I. Bill and helped increase enrollment to over 8,000 students for the first time, but the university's facilities were becoming inadequate to accommodate the surging student population.

== Modern history ==
=== A campus divided ===
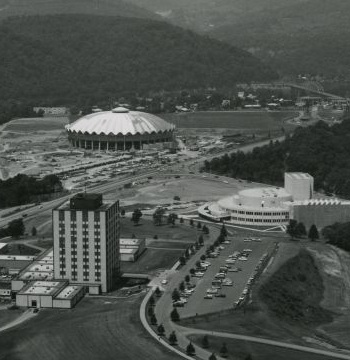
A view of the Evansdale campus and many new facilities constructed around 1970, including the iconic WVU Coliseum.

Preparation for the baby boomer generation and plans for curriculum expansion led to the purchase of land for the Evansdale and Medical campuses. The growth of downtown Morgantown limited the space available on the original campus, therefore the new site was located nearly two miles north on what had been farmland. Beginning in the late 1950s, the university experienced the most rapid period of growth in its history. In 1957, WVU opened a Medical Center on the new campus and founded the first school of dentistry in West Virginia. The basketball program reached a new level of success when the university opened its doors to future 14-time NBA All-Star and Hall of Fame player Jerry West who led the team to the national championship game in 1959. As enrollment approached 14,000 in the 1960s, the University continued expansion plans by building the Evansdale Residential Complex to house approximately 1,800 students, the Mountainlair student union, and several engineering and creative arts facilities on the Evansdale campus. In 1970, the WVU Coliseum, a new basketball facility with a capacity of 14,000, opened near the new campus. As the facilities continued to expand, the University researched ways to facilitate transportation of its growing student population across the split campuses and to solve its worsening traffic congestion. The resulting Personal Rapid Transit system opened in 1973 as the first automated rapid transit system in the world.

=== A new era ===
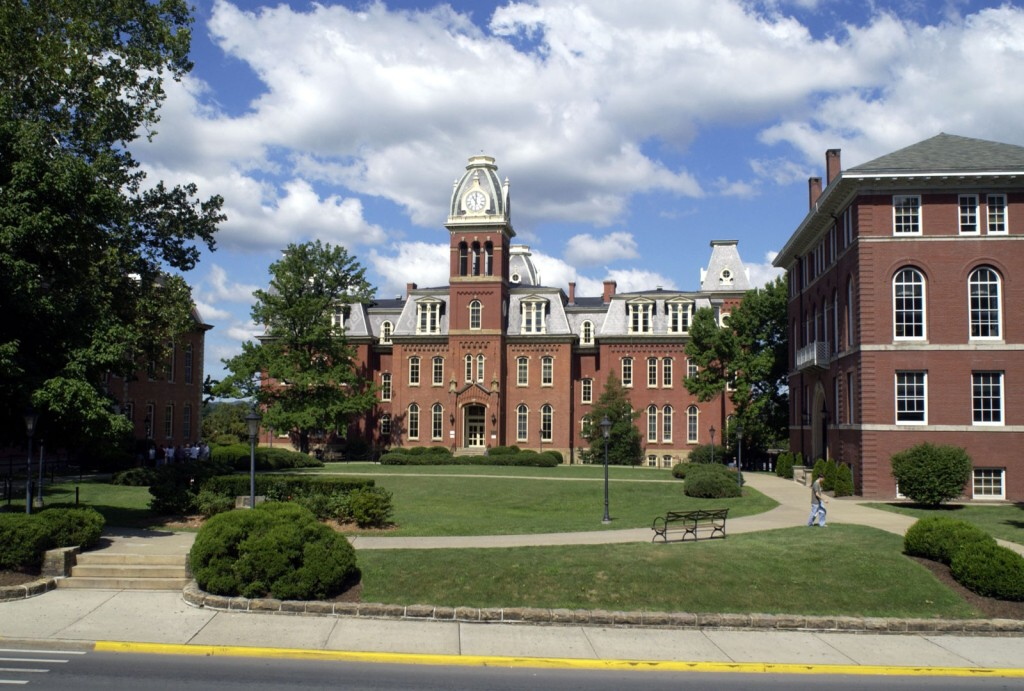
Woodburn Hall is one of the oldest buildings at West Virginia University and has long since been a symbol of the university.

The student population continued to grow in the late seventies, reaching 22,000. With no room for growth on the downtown campus, the football stadium was closed, and the new Mountaineer Field was opened near the Medical campus on September 6, 1980. After an $8 million donation to the university, Ruby Memorial Hospital opened on the Medical campus in 1988, providing the state's first level-one trauma center. Early the next year, the undefeated Mountaineer football team, led by Major Harris, made it to the national championship game before losing to Notre Dame in the Fiesta Bowl. In the 1990s, WVU developed several recreational activities for students, such as FallFest and WVU "Up All Night", a program that has gained national attention. In 2001, a $34 million, 177,000-square-foot (16,400 m^{2}) recreation facility opened on the Evansdale campus.

WVU reached a new level of athletic success during the first decade of the new millennium. The football team featured a 2-0 BCS bowl record, six consecutive bowl game appearances, a #1 ranking in the USA Today Coaches Poll, three consecutive 11-win seasons amassing a 33–5 record, 41 consecutive weeks in the top 25, and 4 conference championships. The men's basketball team won the 2007 NIT Championship, the 2010 Big East championship, and made several appearances in the NCAA tournament including 4 sweet-sixteen and 2 elite-eight appearances, along with a final-four appearance in 2010. The athletic successes brought the university a new level of national exposure, and enrollment has since increased to nearly 30,000 students.

== People ==
West Virginia University's first president was Rev. Alexander Martin. He was a Methodist minister from Scotland who served from the founding of the school in 1867 until 1875.

On April 13, 2007, the Board of Governors voted 16–1 to elect Morgantown attorney Michael Garrison to succeed David Hardesty as the university's president. The Faculty Senate voted to work with Garrison but approved a vote of no confidence in the search.

Garrison's early initiatives, which included moving forward to build a campus child care center after three decades of discussion on the subject and working with the Board of Governors to approve the largest salary increase since 1993, won him praise from many faculty and staff members. The Chronicle of Higher Education and Inside Higher Ed profiled him as an example of a trend toward non-traditional university presidents.

In June 2008, Garrison announced plans to resign in September of that year. According to The Washington Post, Garrison sought to "end a scandal stemming from the university's awarding of an unearned degree to the governor's daughter." C. Peter McGrath was named interim president in August 2008.

James P. Clements became WVU's 23rd president on June 30, 2009. He previously served as provost at Towson University.

On September 16, 2009, Michele G. Wheatly was named Provost and Vice President for Academic Affairs.
