= 2nd Polish Corps =

2nd Polish Corps may refer to:

- 2nd Polish Corps in Russia, 1917–1918
- 2nd Polish Corps (Polish Armed Forces in the West), 1943–1947
- 2nd Mechanised Corps (Poland), 2002–2014
- 2nd Polish Corps (2023–present)

== See also ==
- 2nd Corps (disambiguation)
