= Halbritter =

Halbritter is a surname. Notable people with the surname include:

- Arthur Raymond Halbritter (born 1951), American businessman
- Robert Halbritter (1930–2022), American judge and politician
- Rosemarie Halbritter (born 1945), German rhythmic gymnast
- Walter Halbritter (1927–2003), German civil servant, politician, and party functionary
