= Danuta Siedzikówna "Inka" Memorial (Kraków) =

Monument in Kraków, Poland

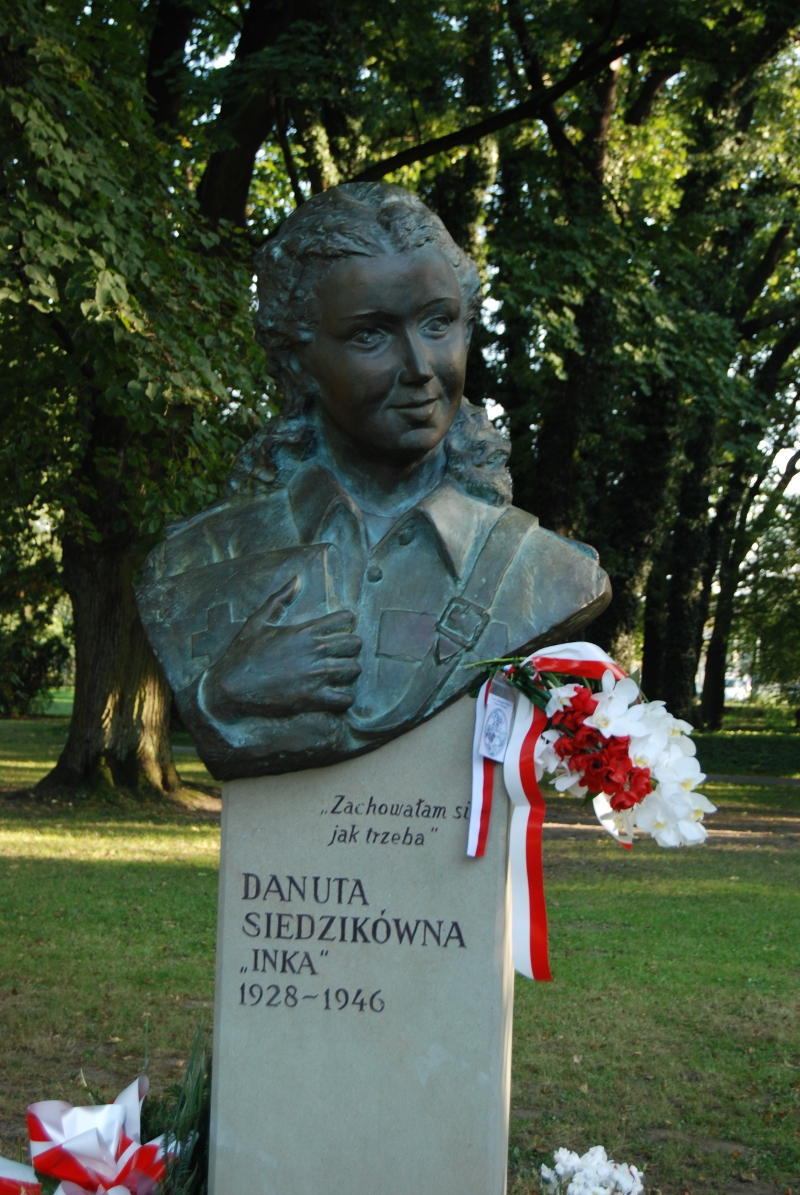
- The sculpture in 2012.
- Interactive map of Danuta Siedzikówna "Inka" Memorial
- Location: Henryk Jordan Park, Krowodrza, Kraków, Poland
- Coordinates: 50.061135°N 19.918288°E
- Designer: Leszek Kruczek
- Type: Bust
- Dedicated to: Danuta Siedzikówna

The Danuta Siedzikówna "Inka" Memorial (Polish: Pomnik Danuty Siedzikówny „Inki”) is a bust sculpture in Kraków, Poland, placed in the Henryk Jordan Park, within the district of Krowodrza. It is dedicated to Danuta Siedzikówna, alias "Inka", a medical orderly of the Home Army during the Second World War, and later in the anti-communist resistance, until being captured and executed at the age of 17 in 1946. The monument was designed by Leszek Kruczek and unveiled on 16 September 2012.

== History ==
The sculpture was designed by Leszek Kruczek, and unveiled on 16 September 2012 in the Henryk Jordan Park. It is dedicated to Danuta Siedzikówna, allias "Inka", a medical orderly of the Home Army during the Second World War, and later in the anti-communist resistance, until being captured and executed at the age of 17 in 1946.

Its copies were unveiled in Warsaw in 2015, and in Piła in 2018.

== Design ==
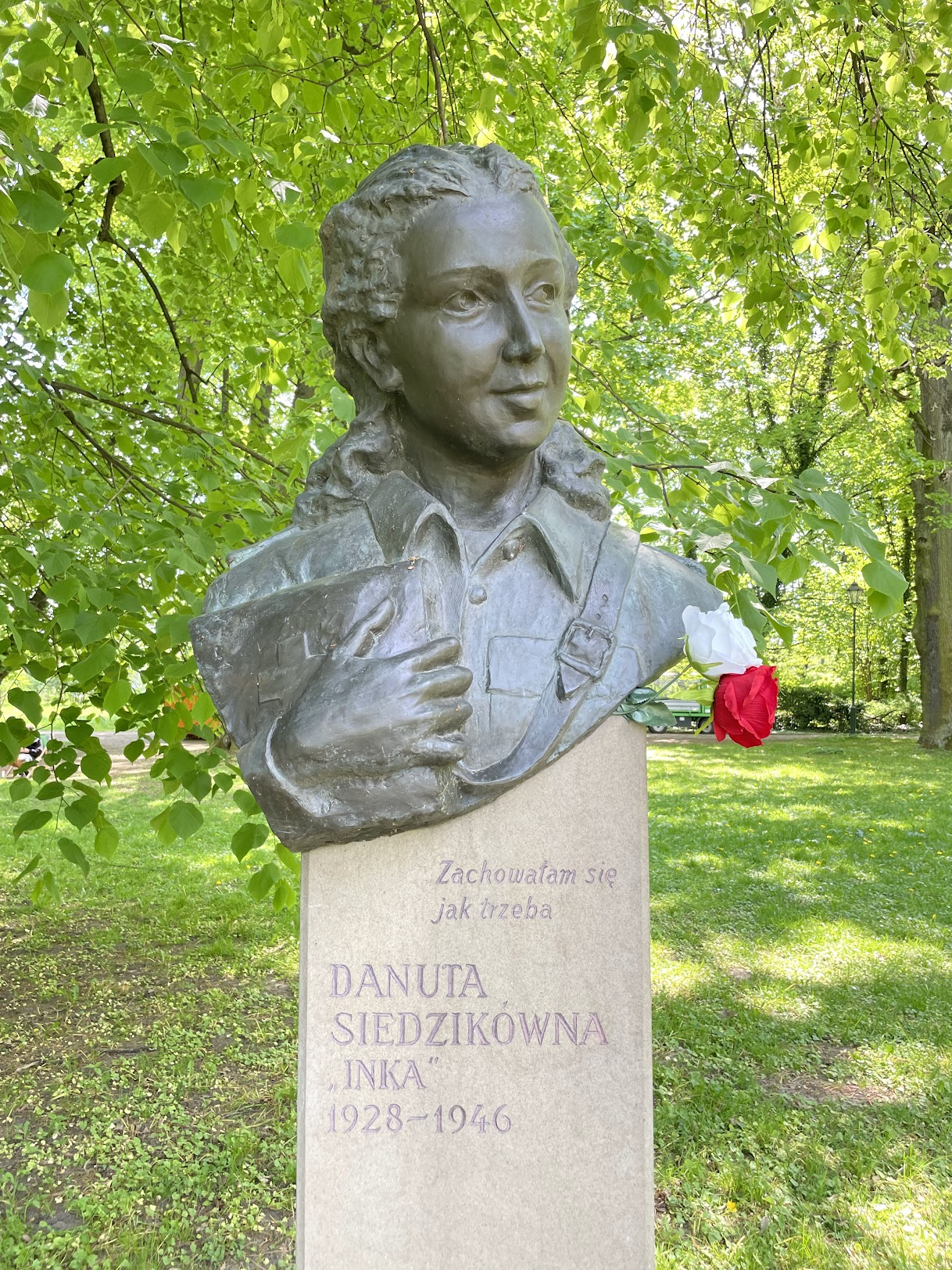
The sculpture in 2025

The monument consists of a bust of Danuta Siedzikówna, depicted in military jacket and holding a nurse bag to her chest. It is placed on a pedestal, which features an inscription which reads "Danuta Siedzikówna 'Inka'; 1928–1946" as well as a Polish quote "Zachowałam się jak trzeba", which translates "I have acted right". It was part of letter written by her days before her execution, in which she stated "Please tell my grandmother, that I have acted right".
