= West Virginia Zoo =

- Interactive map of West Virginia Zoo
- 39.50212°N 79.740186°W
- Date opened: 1993
- Location: Kingwood, West Virginia, United States
- No. of species: 30+
- Website: www.westvirginiazoo.com

Hovatter's Wildlife Zoo, also known as the West Virginia Zoo, is a zoo in Kingwood, West Virginia. The zoo is open seasonally from April to October, and on weekends in November. Opening and closing dates vary from year to year.

== Animals at the zoo include ==
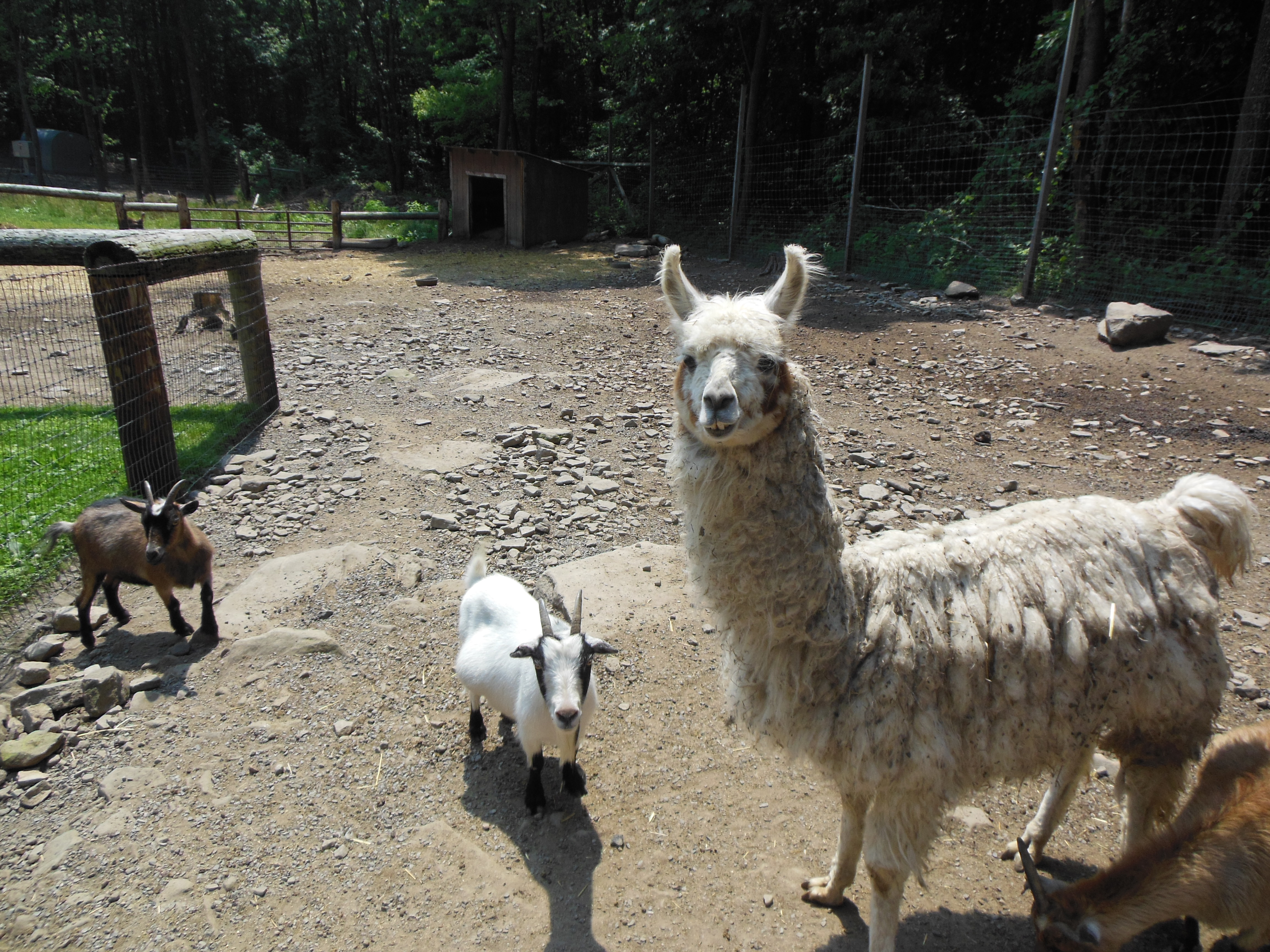
- Three goats and one llama standing around in the zoo
  African lions
- Bengal tigers (Orange and White)
- leopards (spotted and black)
- bobcats
- chimpanzees
- olive baboons
- grivet monkeys
- capuchin (Black and White)
- Patas monkeys
- Ring-tailed lemurs
- rheas
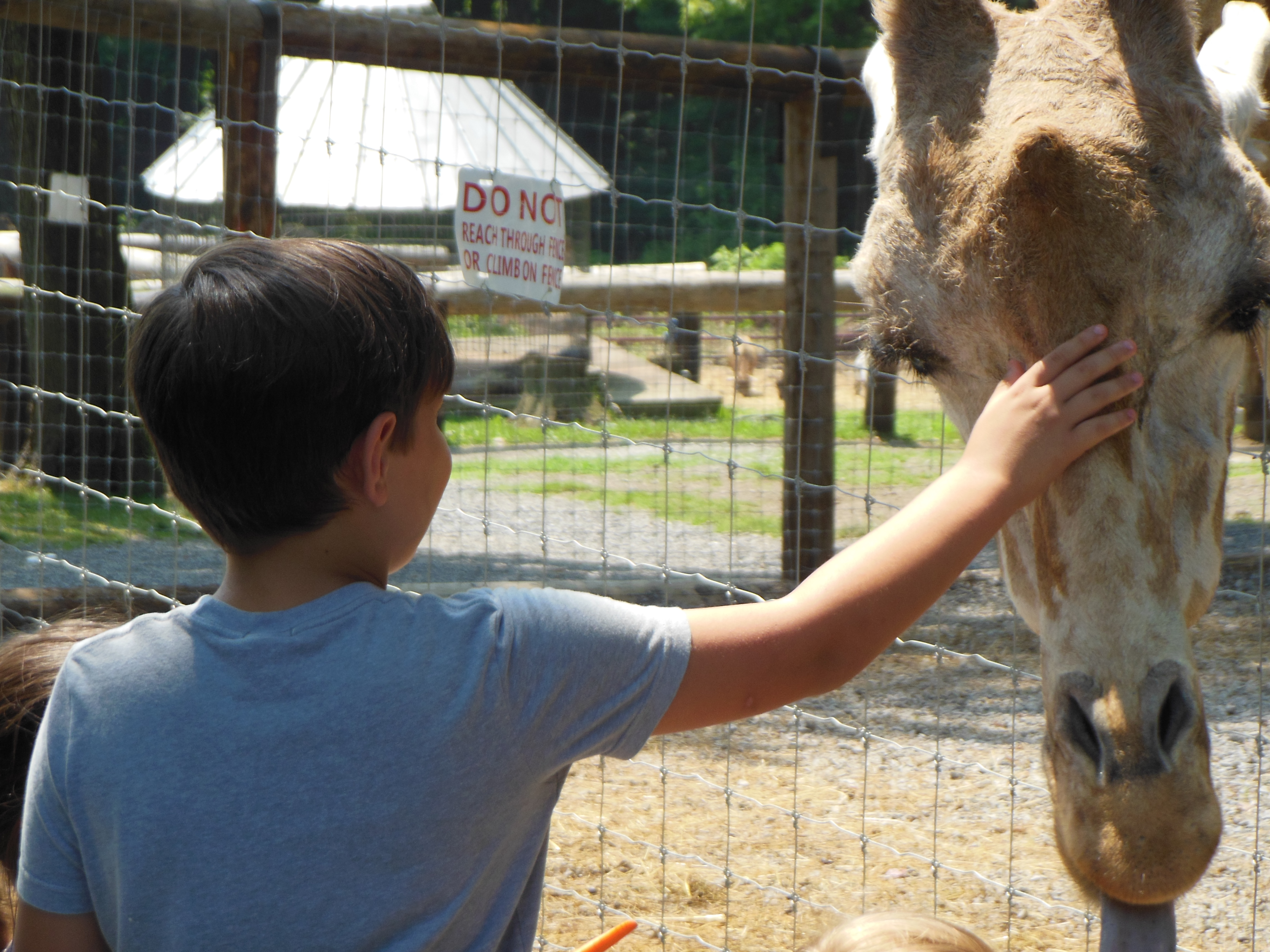
- A boy petting a giraffe in the zoo
  Aoudad
- Emu
- Camels (dromedary)
- African pygmy goats
- Miniature donkeys
- Pot-bellied pigs
- rattlesnakes (Diamondback)
- budgerigars
- turtles (Sulcata tortoise)
- Spotted hyena
- Patagonian cavy
- reticulated giraffes
- Llama
- Watusi
- Chapman's zebra
- Scarlet macaw
- Domestic turkey
- Fennec fox
- Peacock
- Domestic duck
- Wolf
- Domestic rabbit
- Gibbon
- Domestic horse
- Eurasian eagle-owl
- Red kangaroo
- American alligator
- Serval
- Grizzly bear
- African crested porcupines
- Wildebeest
- Wallaby
- Eland
- Nilgai
- scimitar-horned oryx
- Kookaburra
- Coyote
- Prevost's squirrel
- Elk
- Muntjac
- Syrian brown bear
- Sitatunga
- Mallard duck
- Greater kudu
- Fallow deer
- Cotton-top tamarin
- Bactrian camel
- Warthog
- Japanese macaque

== Past animals ==
- Whitetail deer
- Wild boar
- Capybara
- Bison
- Raccoon
- Prairie dog
- Sumatran tiger
- Cougar
- Asian black bear
- Spider monkey
- Asian Elephants

== Tiger cub mishandling ==
In 2015, West Virginia Zoo took tiger cubs from their mother at birth and showed them off behind a gift shop counter at two to three weeks old, before the tiger cubs had been vaccinated. West Virginia Zoo also used the tiger cubs for photo shoots. The U.S. Department of Agriculture Animal and Plant Health Inspection Service cited West Virginia Zoo for exposing the tiger cubs to the public before their immune protection had sufficiently developed to protect them against disease, risking their health and making the zoo noncompliant with the Animal Welfare Act.
