= Preston Academy =

Building in West Virginia, United States

Coordinates: 39°28′13.7″N 79°41′11.3″W

The Preston Academy is an historic, two-story red brick building located at 102 East High Street in Kingwood, West Virginia. Incorporated as an educational institution by Act of the Virginia General Assembly in 1841, the Preston Academy building was completed in 1844.

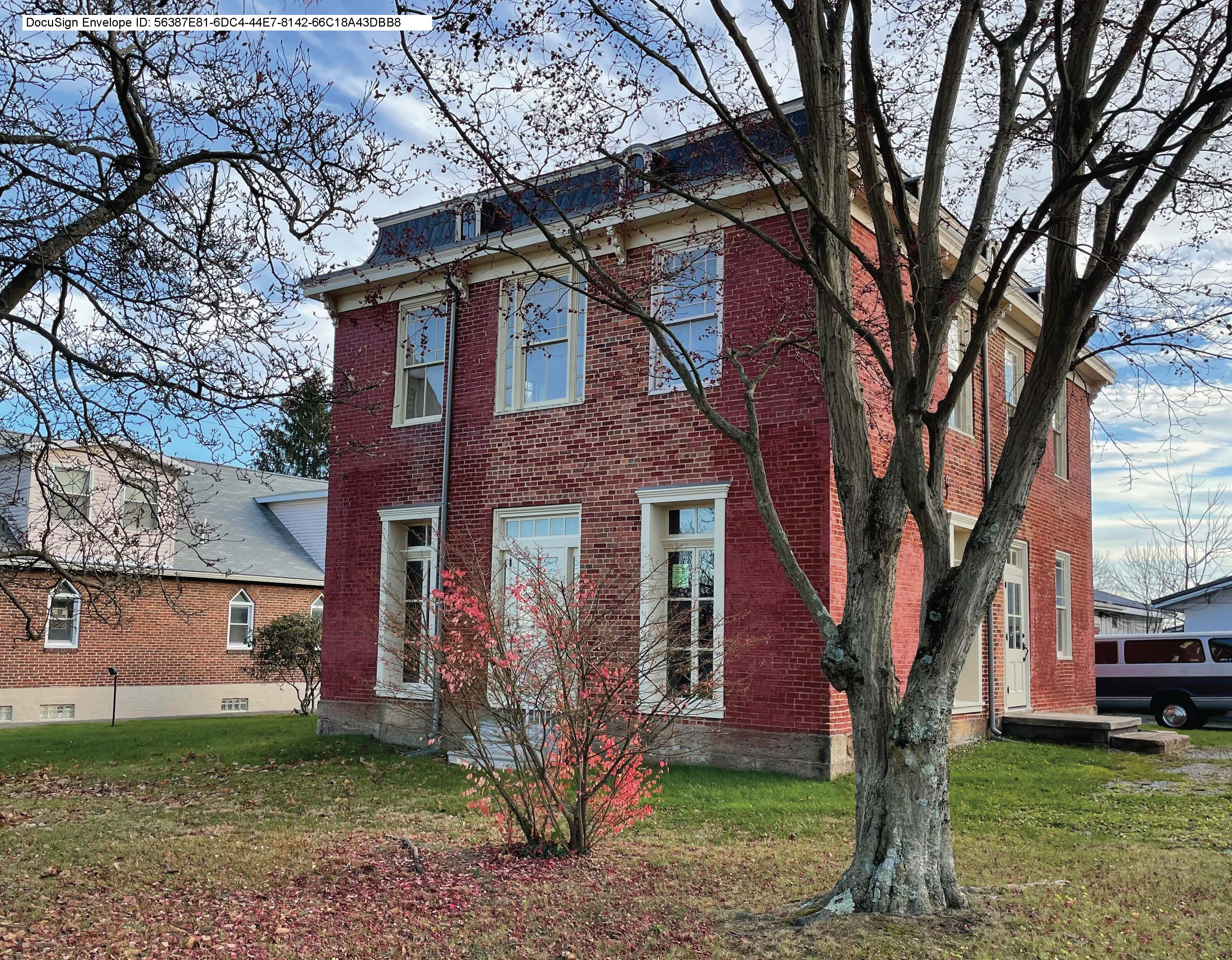

The Academy is significant as one of the oldest buildings in Kingwood, the Preston County seat, which was laid out in 1797 and incorporated in 1811. As renovated in the last half of the 19th century, the building is also a fine example of Second Empire architectural style.

The classical, mid-19th Century academic curriculum at the academy was notable for the high level of its coursework, which today would be considered college preparatory in nature. Parents from across Preston County who wanted further education beyond grammar school for their children enrolled them at the Academy.

The first headmaster was the Scottish-born Rev. Alexander Martin, who later gained fame for creating one of the nation's first statewide public school systems. During his illustrious career, Rev. Martin went on to become the first president of what would become West Virginia University and later, president of Indiana Asbury University, today's DePauw University.

The Academy served as an educational institution until 1875, when it was converted to a private residence. In 1959, the property was purchased by the Preston County Board of Education, which used the building for classrooms and offices until the late 1980s.

In the 1990s, it was all but abandoned, spurring a determined restoration effort by the non-profit organization, The Friends of the Preston Academy.

The Preston Academy was placed on the National Register of Historic Places in 1995 as a contributing resource in the Kingwood Historic District.

== Founding and early history ==
Founded in 1841, the Preston Academy was one of two private schools established in Preston County in the 1840s, the other being in the Brandon School in Brandonville in 1843.

Representation of the Preston Academy as it once looked

In pre-Civil War Virginia, Northwestern Virginia counties like Preston, the "Old Field" subscription school system prevailed. The settlers in an area put up a building at their own expense and employed a teacher.

Such a school was open to all who were able and willing to pay the tuition—usually three cents per day.

Some aid from the state government in Richmond trickled into such schools, but it wasn't much. For example, in 1833 the contribution of the Literary Fund to Preston County's 23 primary schools was a total of only $306.14.

As a result of such scant resources, "Old Field" schools did little more than teach the "Three Rs"—reading, writing, and arithmetic. A given school's term might only be for three months, and attendance was voluntary. Books were rare. Still, illiteracy steadily declined by mid-century.

With the passing of the pioneer era, Preston County residents became increasingly concerned about education. Indeed, educational reforms, including a push for secondary schools, began to sweep through Northwestern Virginia. By the outbreak of the Civil War, 53 private secondary schools known as academies had been established in this part of Virginia.

Preston was one of the earlier counties to push for more education beyond grammar school, and on January 2, 1841, the Virginia legislature passed an act recognizing the Trustees of the Preston Academy in their pursuit of starting a school in Kingwood.

The trustees were among the most well-respected men in the community. They were: political leader William G. Brown, his brother, attorney Thomas Brown, large landowner Buckner Fairfax, merchant Elisha M. Hagans, tavern keeper Solomon P. Herndon, and tanner William Sigler.

Fundraising and construction ensued, with the Academy building open for use in 1844. Students were taught in another building in the years leading up to the new building's opening.

== Advanced classical and modern curriculum ==
From 1841 until the outbreak of the Civil War in 1861, the Preston Academy operated on a tuition basis, providing advanced courses for students whose families could afford to supplement their basic education gained from their neighborhood "Old Field" schools.

An advertisement in the March 23, 1849, edition of the Fellowsville Democrat lists a broad array of secondary school courses available to students attending the Academy:

- French
- Latin
- Greek
- Grammar
- Geography
- Arithmetic
- Surveying and the Sciences

The school year was divided into two terms of five months each, "leaving April and October for vacations". Subscription rates for courses each session included Languages, $12.00; Surveying and the Sciences, $8.00; grammar, geography, and arithmetic, $5.00 per session. Board could be arranged "in town from $1.50 to $2.00 and in the country from $1.25 to $1.75".

== First Headmaster: future first WVU president, the Rev. Alexander Martin ==
In addition to conscientious parents, hardworking students, and the support of community leaders, the Academy benefited tremendously from the efforts of its early headmasters and teachers. Two early headmasters who put their stamp on the school were the first fully-fledged headmaster, the Rev. Alexander Martin, and William Conley.

The Scottish-born Martin came to the school in the fall of 1846 and had great input into the Academy's high-quality, secondary school curriculum. A Methodist Episcopal minister, Martin believed that increased knowledge without commensurate moral improvement could be dangerous. Thus, he emphasized both high academic and moral standards at the Academy. Martin was considered a deep thinking and charismatic educator who sought a well-rounded education for all students, including training in the classical and humanistic subjects as well as newer lessons in the sciences and engineering.

Martin is best known for his later work for the new State of West Virginia. After West Virginia achieved statehood on June 20, 1863, state leaders tapped Martin to create a statewide system of free public schools—one of the nation's first such educational systems.

In 1867, he was named the president of the newly-founded West Virginia University in Morgantown, where he continued his twin emphasis on high academics and strong moral character that he first tested at the Preston Academy two decades before.

Martin later finished his long and accomplished educational career as president of Indiana Asbury University, today's DePauw University.

Following Martin, Major William Conley followed Martin and served as headmaster of the Academy for 14 years. Conley also served locally as a deputy sheriff and contractor, helping to build the Northwestern Turnpike and the Morgantown-Kingwood Turnpike. His son, William Gustavus Conley, served as West Virginia's 18th governor from 1929-1933.

== The academy revived: Civil War and aftermath ==
School continued at the Academy until the Civil War, at which point classes were suspended.

After the Civil War, in the fall of 1866, the Preston Academy reopened on a subscription basis with Professor Benjamin Garvey and his wife, Emily, guiding the school to become a first-class academy.

Garvey was considered a Renaissance man, and, in addition to his daily duties as headmaster, gave a weekly Wednesday night lecture for students and interested townspeople. He also organized the Kingwood Musical Association, holding a concert at the courthouse in Kingwood to raise funds for band instruments.

During the Garvey era, the curriculum had evolved to include four departments of instruction.

The "Primary department" offered instruction in alphabet, grammar, primary arithmetic, and object lessons.

The "Junior department" provided instruction in spelling, reading in second and third readers, mental or oral arithmetic, slate arithmetic—compound numbers, writing, primary geography, and primary grammar.

The "Senior department", which offered courses similar to those first introduced in the 1840s, consisted of two divisions. The "English division" provided instruction in spelling, etymology, reading and elocution, penmanship, arithmetic in all its branches, grammar, geography and history. The "Classical and Mathematical division" gave instruction in Greek, Latin, logic, rhetoric, and composition, bookkeeping, algebra, geometry, trigonometry, calculus, astronomy, and surveying.

The fourth or "extra department" provided instruction in drawing, writing, music, French, Spanish, German, and Italian.

The school year after the Civil War was divided into two terms of 20 weeks each. School was five days per week, six hours per day. Tuition per each twenty-week term was $5.00 for the Primary department, $7.50 for the Junior department, $10.00 for the Senior division of English, $15.00 for the Senior division of Classical and Mathematics, $10.00 for French, Spanish, German, and Italian, $10.00 for instruction in piano or melodeon, and $5.00 for vocal music lessons.

The Academy was governed by a Board of Trustees, a Board of Managers, and the Principal, the title now given to the head of the school.

In addition to providing each student with a progress and attendance report, the principal provided supplies for the teachers hired, disciplined erring students, and opened school each morning by reading a portion of scripture and by prayer, also closing school each afternoon with prayer.

The Academy adopted a student merit/demerit system to enforce discipline similar to the one used by the U.S. Military Academy at West Point. Thus, a student's censure could possibly lead to expulsion. However, the corporal punishment used in the "Old Field" schools was not employed.

By August 1867, negotiations between the Preston County Board of Education and the Academy's Board of Trustees began, with an eye towards the Board taking over the private Academy and developing a free school there. That new free school opened on October 1, 1867. Professor Garvey was retained as a teacher in the free school system.

Fortunately for the students attending the Academy, the new free school curriculum mirrored that which the Academy had developed over the years, with its twin emphasis on classical and modern education. For a rural county to continue to have a broad, high-quality curriculum was rare in the last half of the 19th century.

== The academy building as temporary courthouse ==
From 1867 to 1875, the academy building was used mainly as a public secondary school. This was a challenging period for teachers and students alike, as Preston County's education system was slow in developing.

As a result of opposition to new taxes, the school system was underfunded. The building was in a constant state of bad repair. Funding was so low that the county school board petitioned the state legislature for authorization to sell the building, planning then to donate the proceeds of the sale to help fund the construction of a new schoolhouse.

This sale had to be postponed due to an unexpected and infamous event: On March 7, 1869, the Preston County courthouse was destroyed by fire, presumably by Elihu Gregg, who wanted to prevent foreclosure of his land. The Board of Supervisors of Preston County sought permission from Governor W.E. Stevenson to hold court in the Academy building while a new courthouse was under construction. Governor Stevenson granted their request in a June 21, 1869 proclamation.

The salacious court trial of notorious Elihu Gregg was held at the Preston Academy in 1869. He was found guilty of burning the Preston County Courthouse. Incendiarism then was a capital crime in West Virginia, and Judge John Dille sentenced Gregg to be hanged. Gregg escaped. At Gregg's death in 1887, the mayhem surrounding his life prompted an extensive New York Times article entitled "50 Years A Horse Thief."

Scan of newspaper article "50 Years a Horse Thief"

Another significant event occurring at the Preston Academy was the controversial decision made by the Board of Supervisors during this period. In August 1869, the Board voted to grant licenses to vend "spirituous liquors" throughout the county. Since the court met only periodically, classes may still have met in the Academy building during 1869-70. At that point, the new courthouse was built, ending the Academy building's short, albeit eventful, tenure as the county's makeshift courthouse.

== 1870s through 1980s: continued use as a school and residence ==
Free school sessions were held again in the 1870-71 academic year. A flue fire damaged the building enough to cancel classes. A reporter for the Preston County Journal wrote that "the best thing they could do with the Academy building would be to raze it to the ground and put up a building better adapted for school purposes.“ That didn't happen.

However, by 1874, the Preston County Board of Education voted for a new four-room, red brick schoolhouse near Maplewood Cemetery at the cost of $8,000. This new school became known as the Kingwood Academy and was used for a century as a public school.

In 1875 the Preston Academy's Board of Trustees signed it over to the Preston County Board of Education, with no money changing hands. The Board of Education then sold the property at auction.

From 1875 into the late 1950s, the Preston Academy building was owned by a succession of families. Dr. Bruce Trippett, the first private owner of the Academy, purchased it as a residence at auction for the "stiff price" of $1,186 in August 1875. According to the Journal, in 1877 he removed his office from the Courthouse Square and subsequently used the Academy as both his home and medical office. Dr. Trippett made several needed repairs, including the tin roof, giving it a Second Empire architectural look.

On August 7, 1890, Dr. Trippett and his wife, Laura, sold the "Preston Academy" lot to John M. Crane for "five hundred dollars in hand paid." During Crane's ownership, the Preston Academy building featured the mansard roof with dormer, along with a wraparound porch and cresting, likely iron, along the roof above the mansard.

Crane and his wife, Margaret, held the Preston Academy property until July 14, 1919, when they sold it to Charles H. and Rachel Manown. The fact that the Manowns paid $2,000 for the Academy building suggests that the Cranes had made significant renovations.

After Rachel Manown's passing in 1957, Mr. Manown sold the property on April 2, 1959 to the Preston County Board of Education for $13,000.

The Board of Education used the Academy building once again, this time as an adjunct classroom for the adjacent Kingwood High School for typing, shorthand, and office machine classes.

By the late '60s, the Academy building was used as offices for speech therapists, hearing and sight specialists, and teachers of the gifted, as well as a high school teachers' lounge. By the late 1980s, the building was considered unsafe for these purposes and was used thereafter for storage.

In the 1990s, the building was all but abandoned, spurring a restoration effort by a new, non-profit organization, The Friends of the Preston Academy.

== Friends of the Preston Academy ==
The Friends of the Preston Academy secured multiple grants to rehabilitate the roof, the brick façade, doors and windows, main hallway, bath, and the upstairs rooms. Rooms on the main level are deconstructed awaiting reconstruction. The wrap-around porch awaits construction.

The Friends of the Preston Academy provide cultural and educational opportunities for Preston County in the spirit of the original Preston Academy, begun in 1843. As one example, the Friends of the Preston Academy produced a well-attended play of regional interest on the Academy's lawn, reenacting the trial of Elihu Gregg for burning down the Preston County Courthouse in 1869 and being sentenced to hang.

Historic Structure Report on the Preston Academy from 2002
