= 2nd Polish Corps (2023–present) =

Military unit

2nd Polish Corps, whose full official name is Command of the 2nd Polish Corps – Land Component Command "Lt. Gen. Władysław Anders" (Polish: Dowództwo 2 Korpusu Polskiego - Dowództwo Komponentu Lądowego im. gen. broni Władysława Andersa; D2KP-DKL) is a corps-level tactical unit of the Polish Armed Forces intended to carry out tasks related to planning the use and command of modern tactical units intended for high-intensity activities, assigned to land operations in a multi-domain environment during a crisis situation and war in the national and allied system. The framework of the Polish Corps will follow the example of the US Army Corps.

== History ==
On July 21, 2023, Minister of National Defense Mariusz Błaszczak appointed Divisional General Adam Joks to the position of commanding officer of the 2nd Polish Corps. The aim of forming a new tactical unit is to strengthen interoperability with the United States and its Armed Forces and to strengthen the defense capabilities of the Polish Army. The Corps is formed on the basis of the Land Operations Center - Land Component Command (Polish: Centrum Operacji Lądowych – Dowództwa Komponentu Lądowego) and began operating in November 2023. Its command is located in Kraków, where the 2nd Mechanised Corps was stationed until 2014. The 2nd Polish Corps is directly subordinate to the Armed Forces Operational Command.

== Traditions ==
The name of the Command of the 2nd Polish Corps is derived from the name of the 2nd Polish Corps of the Polish Armed Forces in the West established on 21 July 1943, which, under the command of Lieutenant General Władysław Anders, became famous for the victorious battles for Monte Cassino, Ancona and Bologna.

By decision no. 38/MON of 14 May 2024, a commemorative badge, recognition signs and a pennant for the soldiers' beret were introduced in D2KP-DKL. By decision no. 39/MON of 14 May 2024, D2KP-DKL was named after Lieutenant General Władysław Anders and the holiday was established on 18 May.

By decision no. 56/MON of 29 April 2025, the Command of 2KP-DKL took over and honorably cultivates the heritage of the tradition of:

- II Kraków Corps of Gen. Józef Hauke-Bosak (1863–1864);
- 2nd Polish Corps in Russia (1917–1918);
- General District Kraków (1918–1921);
- 2nd Polish Army (1920–22);
- Corps District No. V (1921–1939);
- Kraków Army (1939);
- 2nd Polish Corps (1943–1947);
- 2nd Polish Army (1944–45);
- Kraków Military District (1992–1998);
- Airborne Mechanized Corps (1999–2001);
- 2nd Mechanised Corps named after Gen. Władysław Anders (2001–2014);
- Land Operations Center – Land Component Command (2014–2024).
Insignia

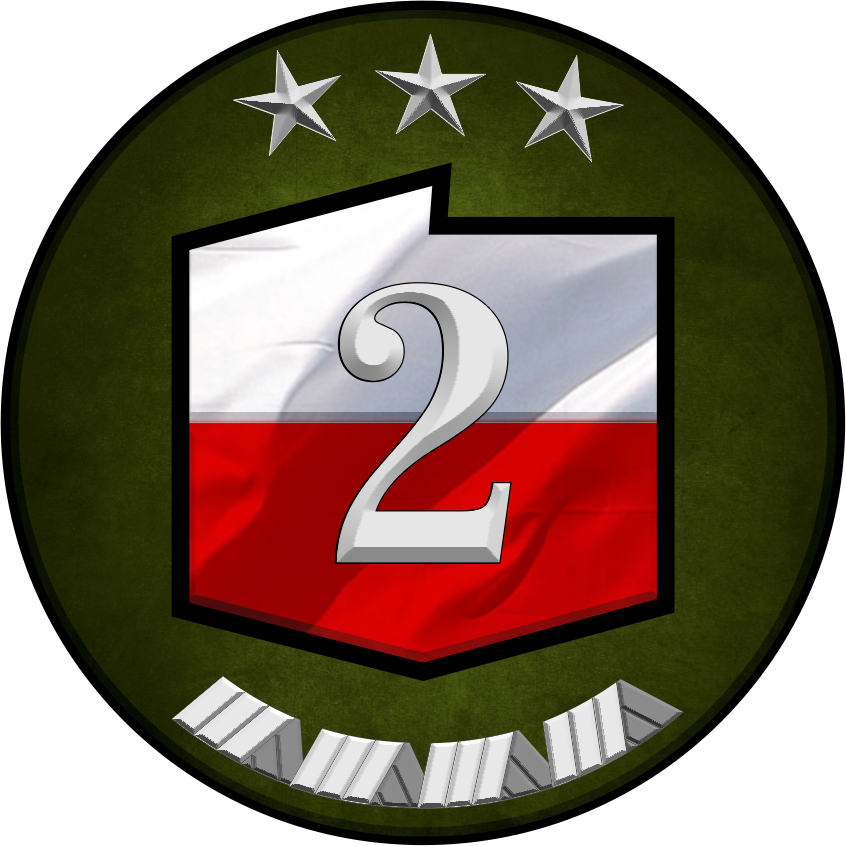
Logo (2023)

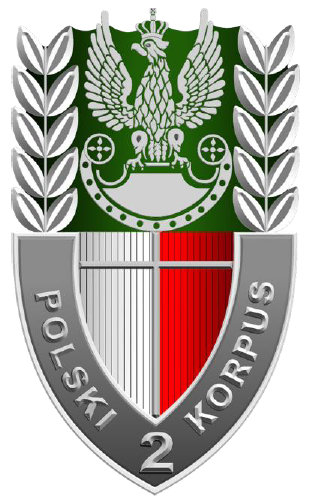
Commemorative badge (2024)

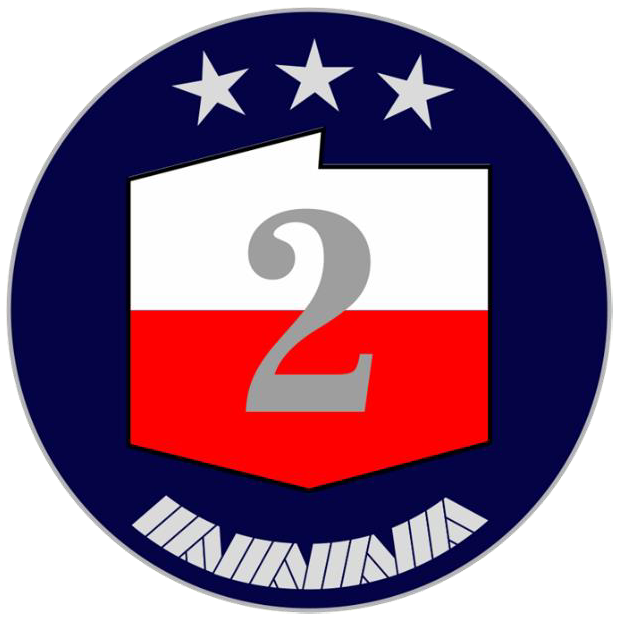
Identification badge for dress uniform (2024)

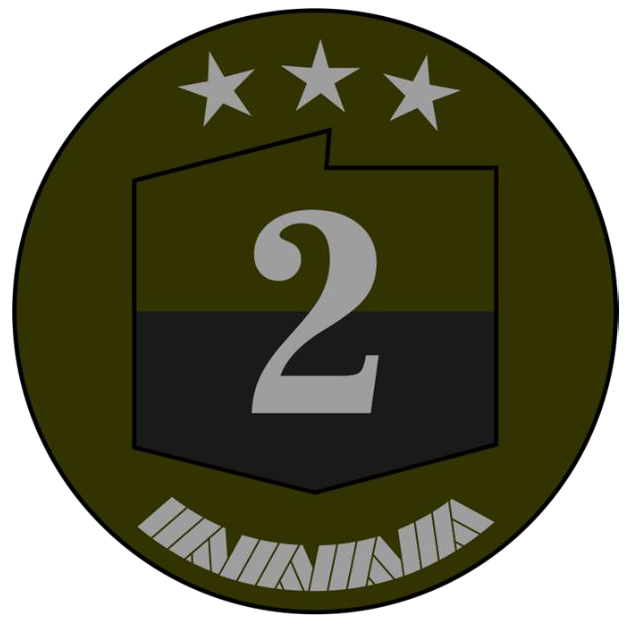
Identification badge for field uniform (2024)

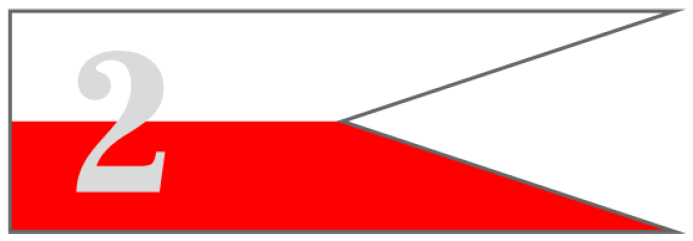
Beret pennant (2024)

== Commanders ==
- General of Arms Adam Joks (since August 2023)
