= Alexander Martin (academic) =

7th President of Indiana Asbury/DePauw University
- In office 1875–1889
- Preceded by: Reuben Andrus
- Succeeded by: John Price Durbin John

1st President of President of West Virginia University
- In office 1865–1875
- Preceded by: Position created
- Succeeded by: John Rhey Thompson

Personal details
- Born: January 24, 1822 Nairn, Scotland
- Died: December 16, 1893 (aged 71) Greencastle, Indiana, U.S.
- Spouse: Carrie Hursey
- Children: 5
- Education: Allegheny College

Alexander Martin (January 24, 1822 – December 16, 1893) was a Scottish-born American educator and minister who was the first president of West Virginia University (1867–1875) and president of Indiana Asbury University, which changed its name to DePauw University during his tenure (1875–1889).

== Early life ==
Martin was born in Nairn on January 24, 1822. His family moved to Jefferson County, Ohio when Martin was fourteen and he received his elementary education there. He spent three years as a tanning and leather dressing apprentice. In 1847, he graduated from Allegheny College.

== Ministry ==
After graduating, Martin became a minister with the Pittsburgh Methodist Episcopal Conference and was assigned to a church in Charleston, West Virginia. He then worked in Clarksburg, Moundsville, Wheeling, and Parkersburg. During the American Civil War, Martin was president of the West Virginia branch of the United States Christian Commission.

== Academia ==
In 1846, Martin supervised the Preston Academy in Kingwood, West Virginia. While in Clarksburg, he spent six years as the principal of the Northwest Virginia Academy. From 1854 to 1864, he was a professor of Greek at Allegheny College.

In 1865, Martin was unanimously elected by West Virginia University's board of trustees to serve as its first president. Martin developed the university's first rules, regulations, course of study, and professorships and the school grew rapidly under his leadership. He also served as a professor of mental and moral science and taught courses in astronomy and physics. Political changes in West Virginia led Martin to resign in June 1875.

In 1875, Martin became the president of Indiana Asbury University. In 1884, the university changed its name to DePauw University in honor of its president of the board of trustees, Washington C. DePauw. Under Martin's leadership, the university expanded from 30 acres to 120, from two buildings to nine, and from six professors to over fifty. He also grew the school's endowment from $120,000 to over $1 million. He resigned as president in 1889, but remained at DePauw as chair of systemic theology until his death from pneumonia on December 16, 1893.
