= Preston High School (West Virginia) =

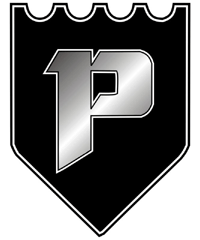

Location
- 400 Knight Drive; Kingwood, West Virginia 26537; United States; 39°27′37.56″N 79°40′39.99″W

Information
- Type: Public, Coeducational high school
- Established: 1992
- School district: Preston County Schools
- Superintendent: Bradley Martin
- CEEB code: 490675
- Principal: Todd Seymour
- Teaching staff: 72.00 (FTE)
- Grades: 9–12
- Student to teacher ratio: 14.67
- Campus type: Fringe Rural
- Colors: Silver and Black
- Mascot: Knight
- Team name: Knights
- Website: www.prestoncountyschools.com/o/phs

Preston High School is a four-year public high school in Kingwood, West Virginia, United States. It houses nearly 1,200 students from the entirety of Preston County, West Virginia. The school colors are black and silver and the mascot is the Knight. Preston High School was recognized by the Blue Ribbon Schools Program, the highest award an American school can receive.

== School history ==
Preston High School came into being with the consolidation of Bruceton High, Central Preston High, East Preston High and West Preston High. The school was built in Kingwood on the same campus as the existing vocational and academic center. This consolidation and the building of the new campus opened in 1992. Originally, Preston High only enrolled students from grades 10–12, but in the fall of 1998, the middle school concept was established in Preston County, and ninth graders joined the student body. The school enrollment has been approximately 1,400 since then. The high school was also the home of Central Preston Middle School from 2005 to 2015, due to building issues in the old middle school facility.

=== Blue Ribbon school ===
For the 1994–96 school years, Preston High School was recognized with the Blue Ribbon School Award of Excellence by the United States Department of Education.

== Extra-curricular activities ==
The school is home to a wide variety of extra-curricular, activities including the fine arts as well as sports and athletics. The school's athletics compete in baseball, basketball, football, cross country, golf, soccer, softball, track, volleyball, and wrestling. Lacrosse is a club sport.

=== Football ===
The Preston Knights football team ended a 21-game losing streak dating back to the playoffs of 2008 by defeating the Hampshire Trojans 20–19 on August 26, 2011. Preston's records for the last four years is 7–3 in 2007, 6–5 in 2008 with playoff, 0–10 in 2009, 0–10 in 2010, all under Ralph Wilson. The current head coach is Johnathan Tennant. Since Tennant's arrival the Knights have had 3–7 and 5–5 seasons.

=== Marching band ===
The "Marching Knights" participate in the Tournament of Bands. They are in Category 4 in Chapter 13, which means they have over 100 members marching and they compete in the Chapter 13 region according to the maps of the TOB Commissioners. In the 2004 marching season, the percussion section was awarded with the Grand Champion drum, and the band placed second overall in the Chapter 8 Championships at Baldwin High School, Baldwin, Pennsylvania.

=== Track and field ===
Student Kaylyn Christopher won 2006 state championships in three events: the 800m, 1600m (5:00.18) and 3200m, with state records set in the two longer distance events. Christopher became the first female in West Virginia to the 1600m in under five minutes (4:58.18). With Christopher's record-breaking performance leading the way, the Preston High School track team won the 2007 West Virginia Class AAA State Track Championship. Christopher won the 1,600 state championship for her third straight year and won the 800 in a state record time of 2:13.67. Preston's cross country team, coached by Paul Martin, placedthird at States in 2011 overall, with Peter Schwarzenberg taking third and Kaitlyn Workman taking fifth.

=== JROTC ===
The school's JROTC Rifle Team won the West Virginia high school rifle championship in 2007, the sixth consecutive year that the team earned the title. The team competed in the 2007 JROTC Eastern Championships held in Fort Benning, Georgia.

=== Automotive ===
Justin Lewis won the 2008 Ford/AAA Auto Skills competition.
