= Statue of Wojtek the Bear (Warsaw) =

Sculpture in Warsaw, Poland

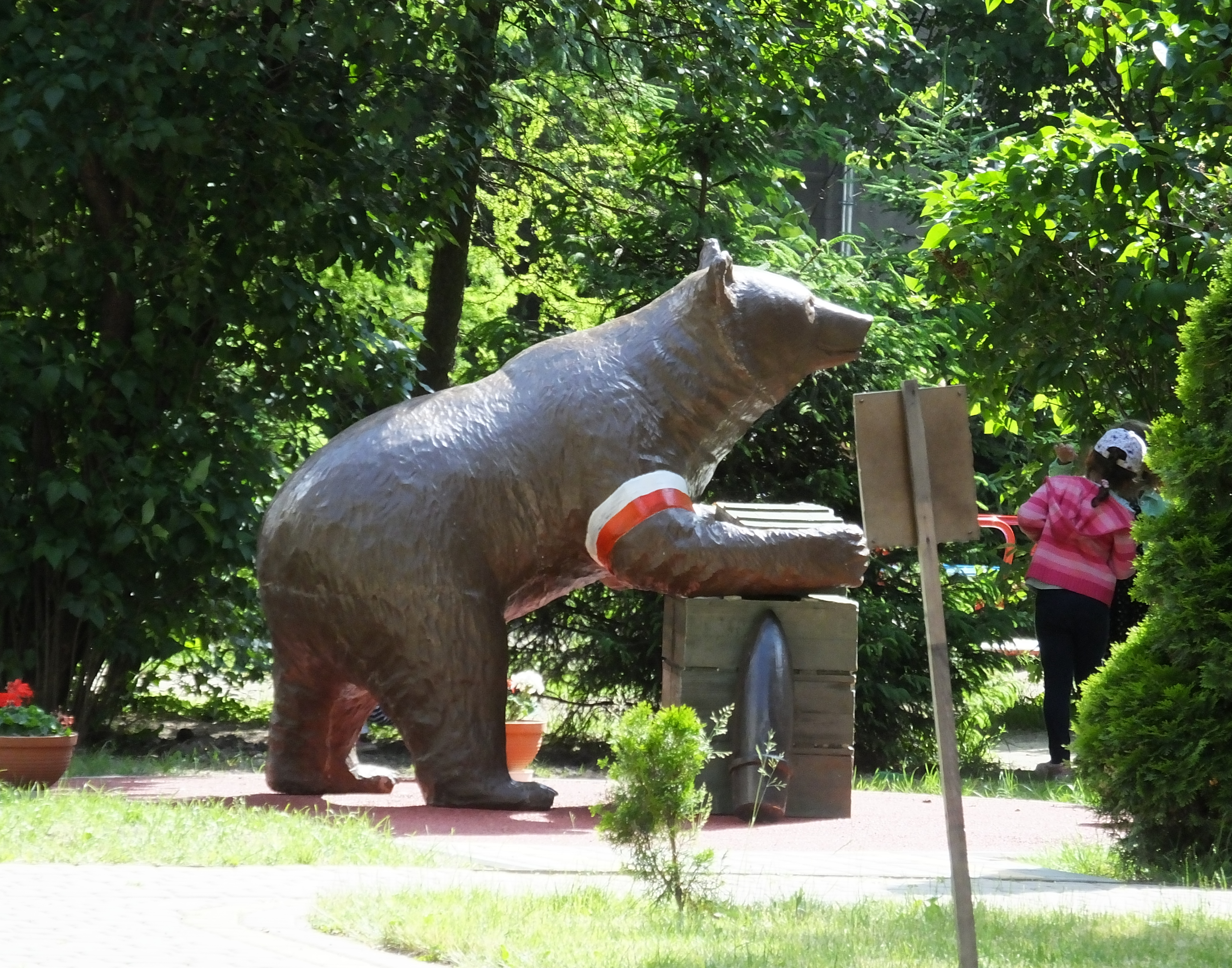
- The statue in 2017.
- Interactive map of Statue of Wojtek the Bear
- Location: 3 Siewierska Street, Ochota, Warsaw, Poland
- Coordinates: 52.212726°N 20.976311°E
- Type: Statue
- Opening date: 30 May 2017
- Dedicated to: Wojtek

The statue of Wojtek the Bear (Polish: Pomnik misia Wojtka) is a bronze sculpture in Warsaw, Poland, within the neighbourhood of Old Ochota. It is placed at 3 Siewierska Street, in front of the Wojtek the Bear Kindergarten no. 99. The monument is dedicated to Wojtek (1942–1963), a Syrian brown bear which accompanied the 2nd Polish Corps during World War II. It was unveiled on 30 May 2017.

== History and design ==
The statue was unveiled on 30 May 2017 in front of the Wojtek the Bear Kindergarten no. 99. The statue depicts the namesake of the building, Wojtek, a Syrian brown bear standing on his hind legs, stacking a pile of crates of ammunition, with am artillery shells rested on its side.
