= Preston County Schools =

School district in Preston County, West Virginia

Location
- Kingwood, West Virginia; United States

District information
- Type: Public School District
- Superintendent: Bradley Martin
- School board: Bruce Huggins, President; Pamela Feathers, Vice-President; Cross Kisner; Lucas Tatham; Jeff Zigray

Other information
- Website: https://www.prestoncountyschools.com

Preston County Schools is the operating school district within Preston County, West Virginia. It is governed by the Preston County Board of Education. The school system serves 4,329 students and maintains 10 schools.

== Schools ==
- Preston High School
- Aurora School
- Bruceton School
- Central Preston Middle School
- Kingwood Elementary School
- Rowlesburg Opportunity Center (est. 2025)
- South Preston School
- Terra Alta East Preston School
- West Preston School

== Former Schools ==
High Schools:

- Albright High
- Arthurdale High
- Aurora High (closed 1977)
- Bruceton High (closed 1991)
- Central Preston High (closed 1991)
- East Preston Senior High (closed 1991)
- Fellowsville High (closed 1972)
- Kingwood High (closed 1977)
- Masontown High
- Newburg High (closed 1977)
- Rowlesburg High (closed 1991)
- Terra Alta High (closed 1977)
- Tunnelton High (1914 - 1977)
- Valley High (closed 1977)
- West Preston High (closed 1991)

Middle/Junior High Schools:

- Arura Junior High
- Central Preston Junior High (1977 - 1990)
- South Preston Junior High (1991 - 1997)
- South Preston Middle School (1998 - 2013)
- West Preston Middle School

Prek-8 Schools:

- Rowlesburg School (closed 2025)

Elementary Schools:

- Aurora Elementary School
- Denver Elementary School
- Fellowsville Elementary School (closed 2025)
- Newburg Elementary School
- Tunnelton-Denver Elementary School (closed 2013)
- Valley Elementary School

One-room schools include:

- Arthurdale School
- Bruceton School
- Cherry Grove School
- Chestnut Ridge School
- Crane School
- Deep Hollow School
- Guthrie School (1780-1930)
- Howesville School
- Lantz Ridge School (closed 1955)
- Lick Run School
- Mt. Nebo School
- Preston Academy (1844-1875)
- Preston County Institute
- Reedsville School (closed 1915)
- Sell School
- Sugar Valley School

== History ==
By 1907, there were a total of 180 schools throughout Preston county. Only two were constructed in brick (Kingwood and Terra Alta), and the rest were framed. This would also be the year that Newburg and Rowlsburg High school would be constructed. In 1914, Tunnelton High School would also be completed.

Preston county had two known Summer Normal schools - Terra Alta and Kingwood.
