= Robert Halbritter =

American judge and politician (1930–2022)

Robert C. Halbritter (May 28, 1930 – July 7, 2022) was an American judge and politician.

Halbritter was born in Grafton, West Virginia. He went to Potomac State College of West Virginia University, West Virginia University and then received his law degree from West Virginia University College of Law in 1954. Halbritter served in the United States Army from November 1954 to November 1956 and was stationed at West Point, New York.

He lived in Kingwood, West Virginia with his wife and family and practiced law in Kingwood. Halbritter served on the Kingwood City Council from 1962 to 1964 and in the West Virginia House of Delegates from 1966 to 1971. He then served as a judge in the West Virginia State Circuit Court from 1971 to 1995. He died at his home in Kingwood, West Virginia.
