= Henryk Jordan =

Polish philanthropist and physician

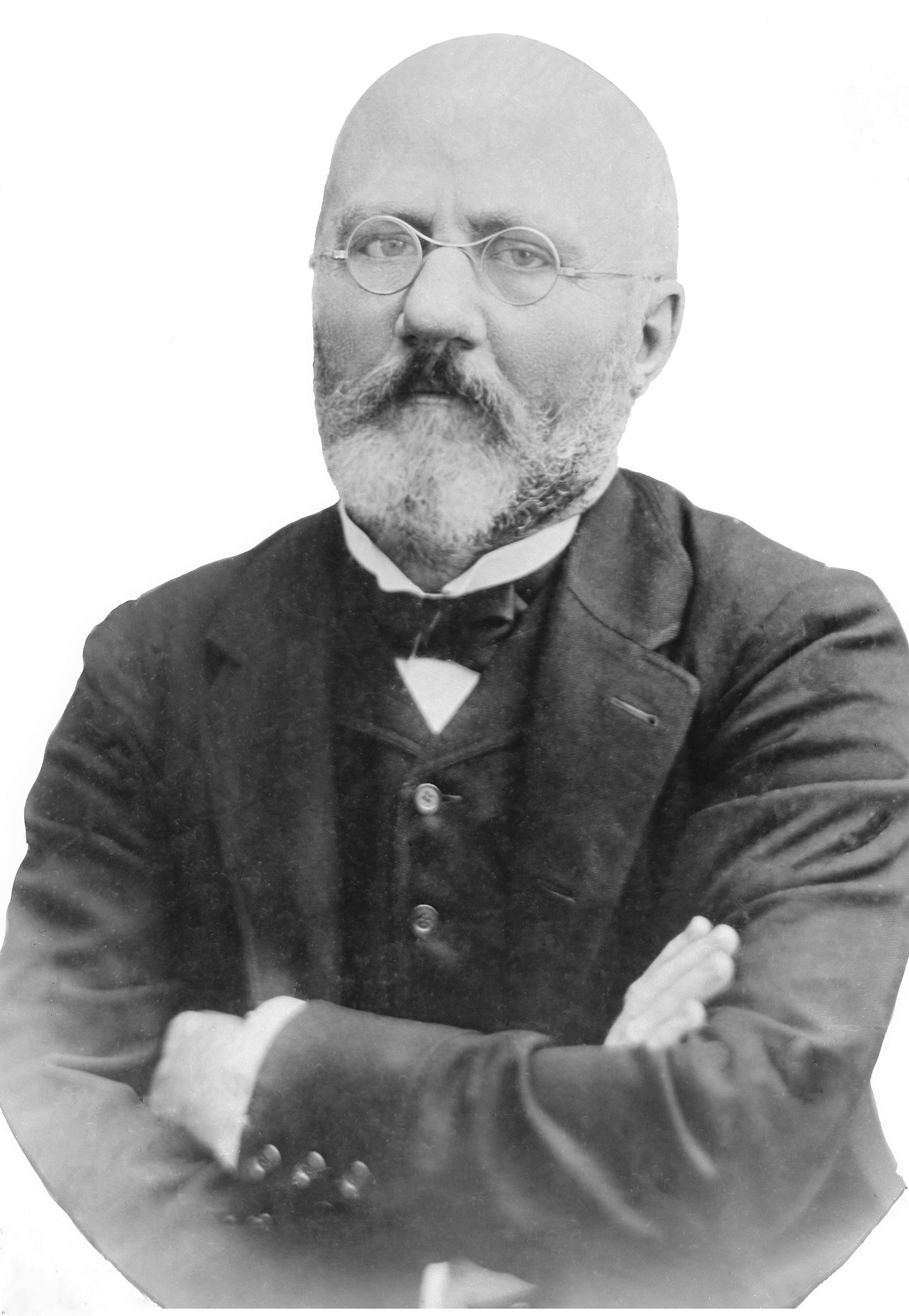
Henryk Jordan, founding father of the Polish physical education movement

Henryk Jordan (23 July 1842 in Przemyśl – 16 May 1907 in Kraków) was a Polish philanthropist, physician and pioneer of physical education. A professor of obstetrics from 1895 at Kraków's Jagiellonian University, Jordan became best known for organizing children’s playgrounds, called "Jordan's parks" after him.

== Life ==
Henryk Jordan was born into an impoverished noble family from the village of Zakliczyn, which over time moved to other places in Polish Galicia (for example Przemyśl). His father, Bonifacy Jordan, gave private lessons. His mother, Salomea Wędrychowska, was a homemaker.

Jordan received his high-school education in Tarnopol and Tarnów. In 1861, however, he took part in pro-Polish demonstrations for which he was threatened with expulsion from school. In 1862 he moved to Trieste and a year later passed his high-school examinations, in Italian, with honors.

Jordan began his university studies in Vienna, and from 1863 continued them at Kraków's Jagiellonian University. He passed his science examinations in 1867 but did not receive his master's degree due to pneumonia. He went to Berlin and from there to New York City. While there, Jordan for the first time encountered the "Swedish school of gymnastics" for girls and young women, which became an area of interest for him.

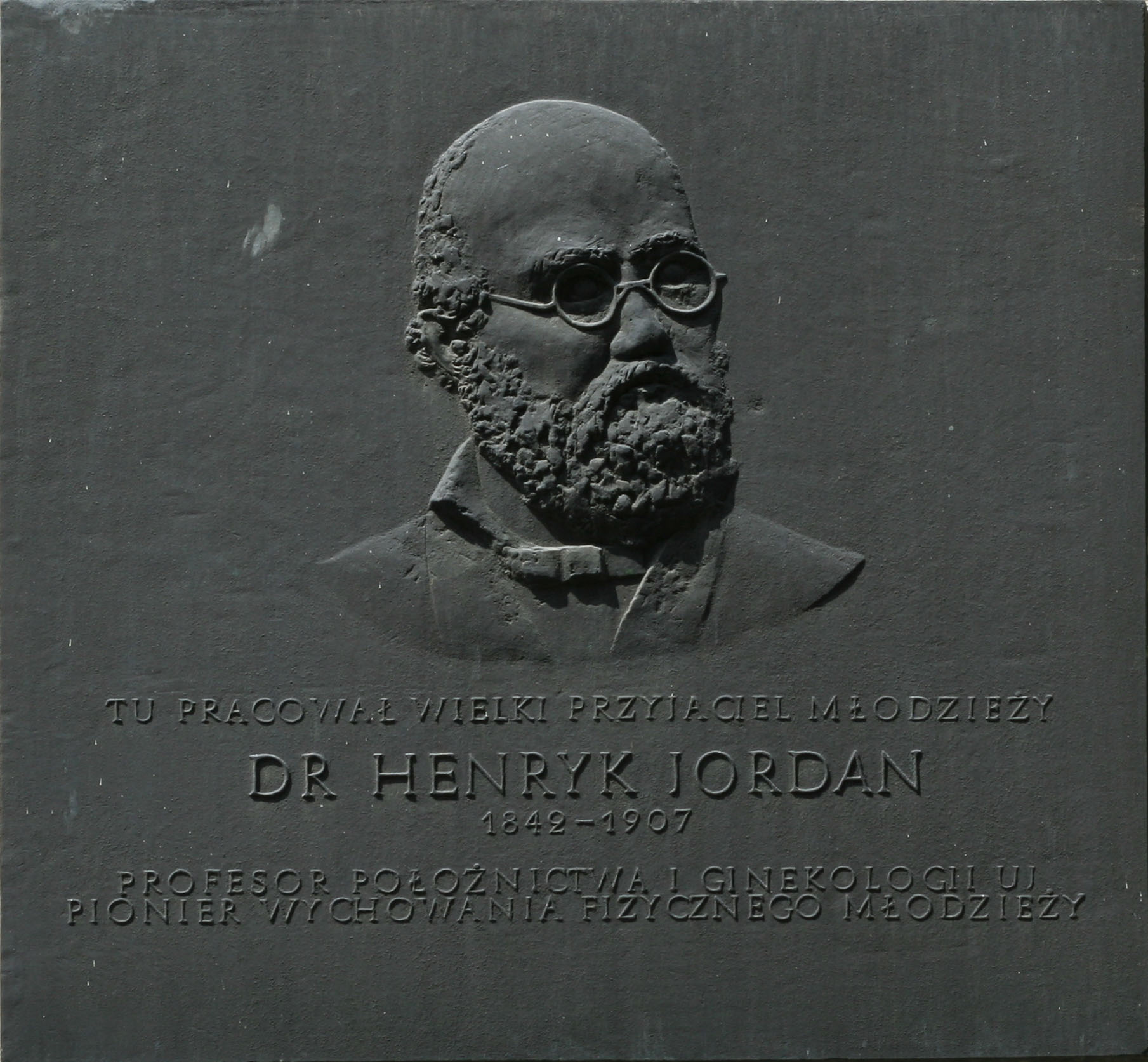
Plaque commemorating Henryk Jordan, on Kraków's Wiślna Street

While in the United States, Jordan began his medical practice and also opened a school for midwives. After returning to Europe, he continued to work first in England, then in Germany. Back in Kraków, Jordan took on a number of leadership positions. From 1895 to 1901 he was a Member of Parliament representing the city at the Polish Diet of Galicia and Lodomeria. In addition, Jordan presided over the Kraków Gynecological Society, as well as the Society of Medical Doctors, and the Association of Polish Teachers of Higher Education (a precursor to the Polish Teachers' Union). Thanks to his efforts, physical education classes were introduced as compulsory into all Polish schools.

Jordan's biggest achievement was to set up a public playground in 1889, with exercise fixtures modeled after playgrounds in the USA, the first in Kraków and perhaps the first in Europe. The Jordan's Garden built on the grounds of Kraków’s Błonia included a swimming pool, 12 playing and soccer fields, as well as numerous running and exercise tracks. Facilities were added for indoor activities in 1906, in case of bad weather. The park was equipped with locker rooms and showers. On top of that, a free meal service was established for the children.

== Legacy ==
Jordan believed that "Being serious and working all the time is humanly impossible. A tired body requires rest, as does an overburdened spirit striving for joy."

"Jordan’s gardens" took off like wildfire. They were opened in Warsaw, Płock, Kalisz and Lublin. In 1928 a Society for Jordan's Gardens was established to oversee the construction of recreational facilities in interwar Poland.

== See also ==
- History of Poland (1795–1918)
- Science in Poland
- Culture of Kraków
