= James Clark McGrew House =

Historic house in West Virginia, United States

- U.S. National Register of Historic Places
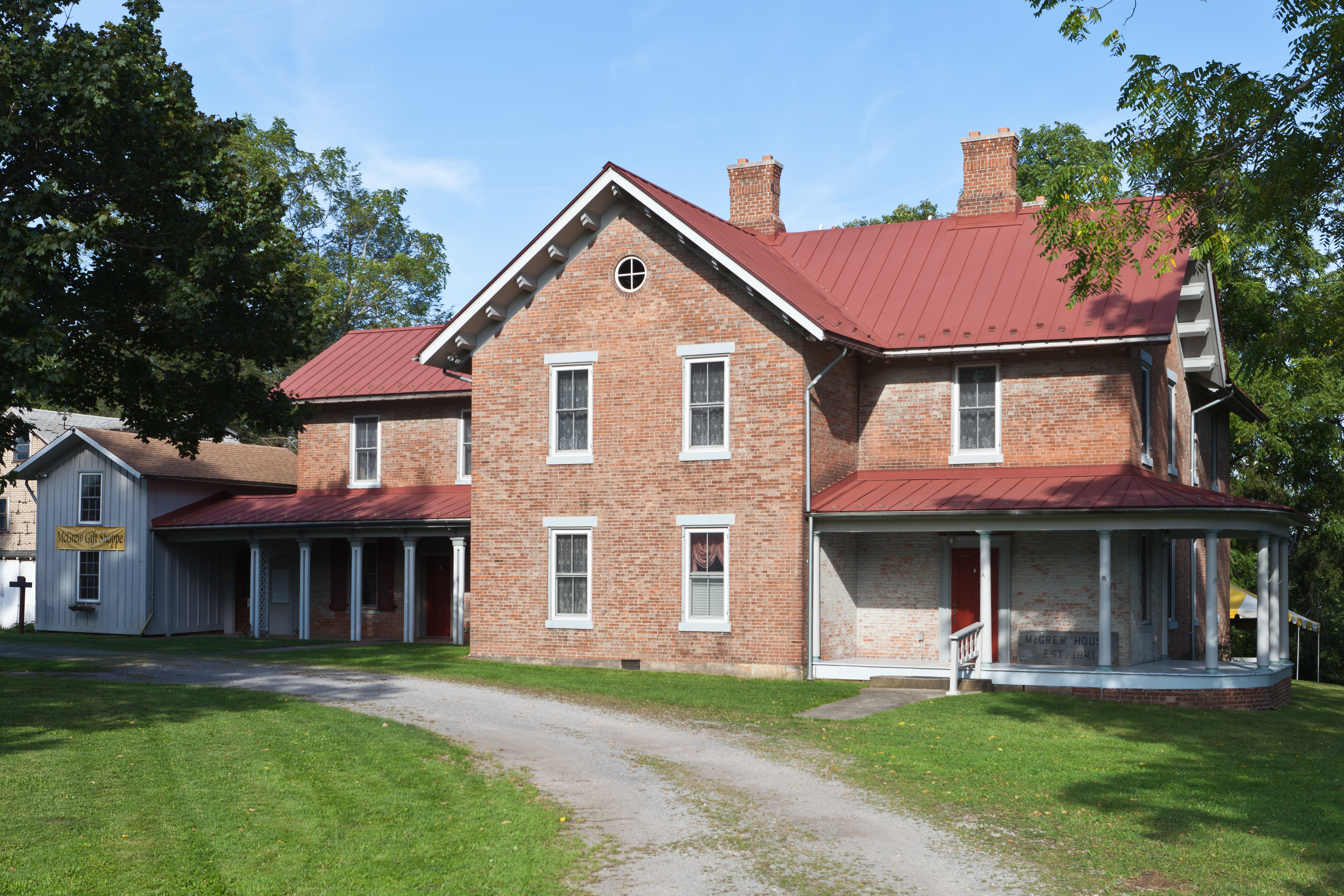

- Location within West Virginia Location within the United States
- Location: 109 E. Main St., Kingwood, West Virginia
- Coordinates: 39°28′20″N 79°41′11″W
- Area: 2.8 acres (1.1 ha)
- Architectural style: Italianate, Federal, Gothic Revival
- NRHP reference No.: 93000618
- Added to NRHP: July 9, 1993

James Clark McGrew House, also known as the Gibson Property, is a historic home located at Kingwood, Preston County, West Virginia. The house consists of a large main two-story block and a low two-story ell. The oldest section is the northern ell, built in 1841. The main block was built about 1870. Also on the property are a contributing two-story barn/outbuilding connected to the house with a breezeway and a two-story Gothic Revival barn/carriage house. The house was built by James McGrew (1813 – 1910), a founding father of West Virginia.

It was listed on the National Register of Historic Places in 1993.
