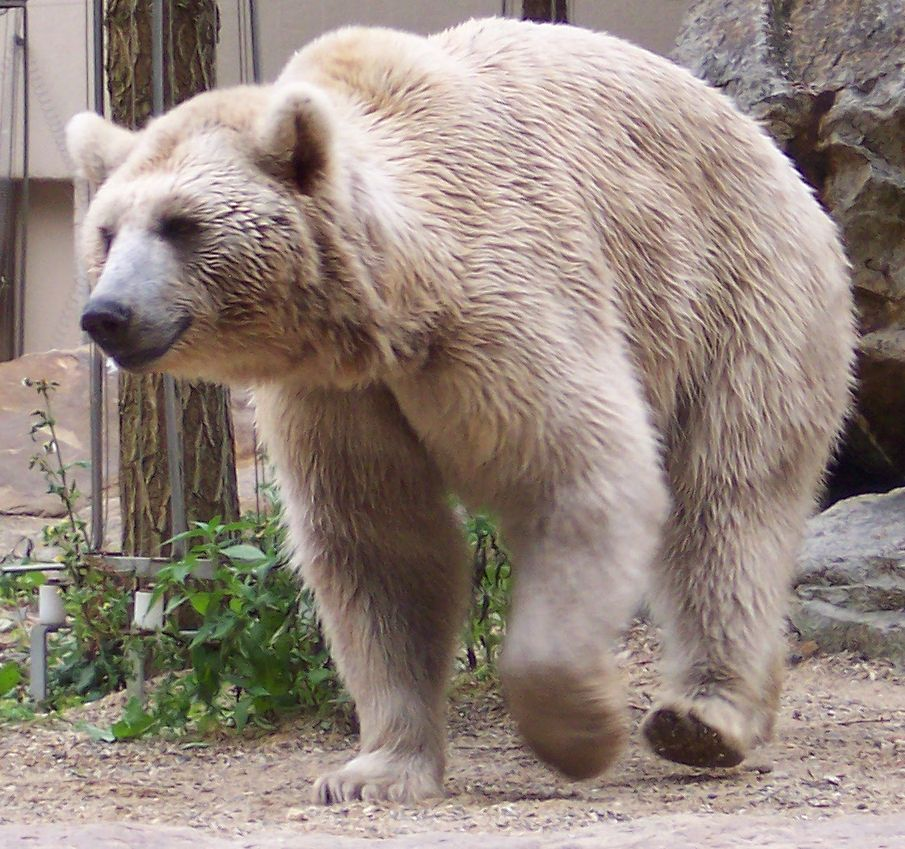

Conservation status
- Endangered (IUCN 3.1)

Scientific classification
- Kingdom: Animalia
- Phylum: Chordata
- Class: Mammalia
- Order: Carnivora
- Family: Ursidae
- Genus: Ursus
- Species: U. arctos
- Subspecies: U. a. syriacus

Trinomial name
- Ursus arctos syriacus Hemprich & Ehrenberg, 1828
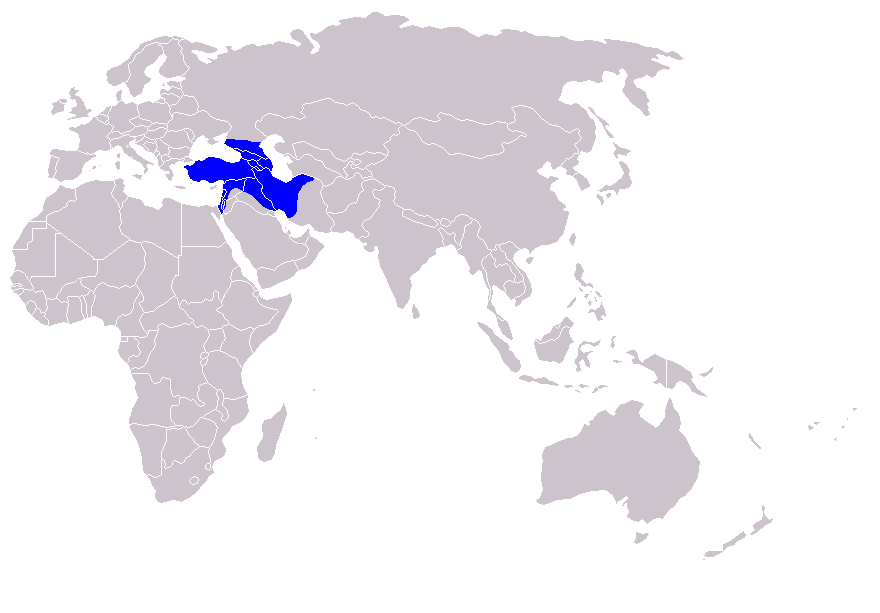
- Historical distribution

Synonyms
- caucasicus Smirnov, 1919 dinniki Smirnov, 1919 lasistanicus Satunin, 1913 meridionalis Middendorff, 1851 persicus Lönnberg, 1925 schmitzi Matschie, 1917 smirnovi Lönnberg, 1925

= Syrian brown bear =

Subspecies of mammal

The Syrian brown bear (Ursus arctos syriacus, formally Ursus arctos arctos ) is a medium-sized and endangered subspecies of brown bear native to the Middle East and West-Central Asia, particularly around the Caucasus Mountains.

== Characteristics ==
The Syrian brown bear's fur is usually very light brown and straw-coloured. The hair on the withers is longer, with a grey-brown base, and is often a different shade from the rest of the body, seen in some individuals as a dark stripe running across the back. The lighter colors usually appear at higher altitudes. Their legs are commonly darker than the rest of their body. It is the only known bear in the world to have white claws. It is a rather small bear. Adult males have skulls measuring approximately 30–40 cm (12–16 in). The Syrian brown bear weighs up to 550 lb (250 kg), and measures from 101–140 cm (40–55 in) from nose to tail.

Populations in the Caucasus were thought to belong to Ursus arctus syriacus, and to overlap parts of the Eurasian brown bear's range. Eurasian brown bears are larger in size with coats that are considerably darker, likely due to living in more frigid climates, as darker pigmentation helps to absorb heat from the sun. These mixed bears are thought to have originated during the Holocene, when Syrian brown bears supposedly migrated northward and interbred with the larger northern brown bears. Today, that hypothesis is considered by experts to be unfounded. After breeding, the highly protective mother bear gives birth in a den; litter sizes range from one to three cubs.

== Distribution and habitat ==
Historically, the brown bear occurred in the Middle East from Turkey to Turkmenistan. Today, the brown bear is considered extremely rare (possibly absent) in its namesake Syria, and has been extirpated from Algeria, Belgium, Denmark, Egypt, Germany, Hungary, Ireland, Israel, Jordan, Liechtenstein, Lithuania, Luxembourg, Mexico, Moldova, Monaco, Morocco, Netherlands, Palestine, Portugal, San Marino, Tunisia, and the United Kingdom. The bear survives only in Armenia, Azerbaijan, Georgia, Iran, Iraq, Turkey, and Turkmenistan.

Syrian Brown Bears were thought to be extinct in Syria and Lebanon since the 1950s until the 2000s, when brown bear tracks were recorded in the snow in the Anti-Lebanon Mountains (Syria) in 2004, and again in February 2011. As for Lebanon, the first encounter of a brown bear since the 1950s was recorded in 2017.

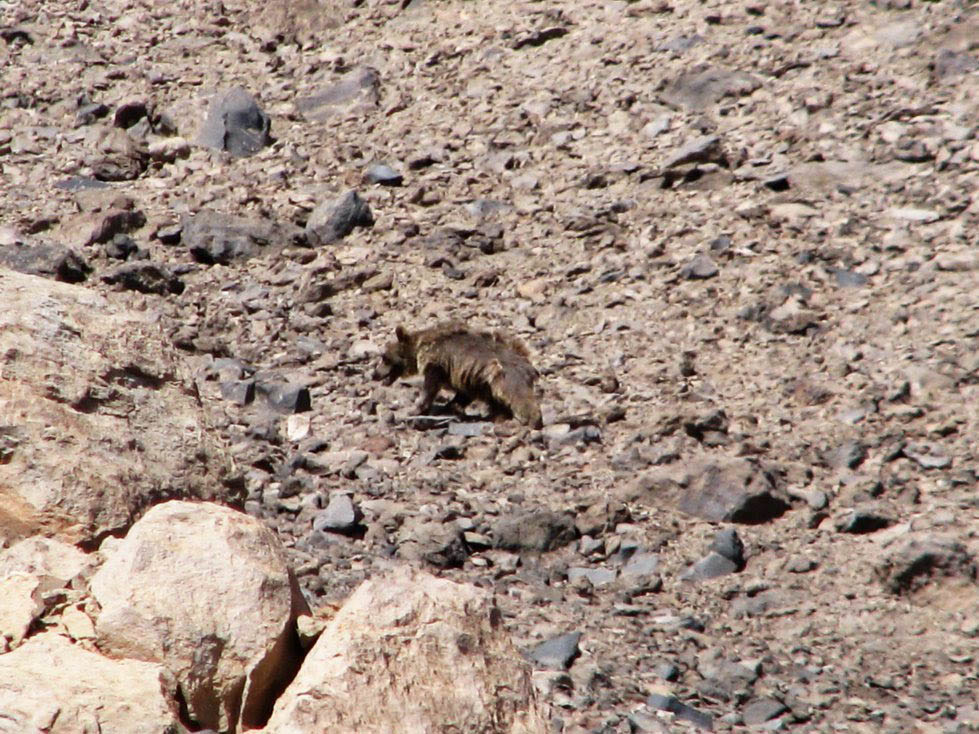
A brown bear in Lar National Park, northeast of Mount Damavand, Iran

In Turkey, important habitats are Mediterranean belt forests, deciduous, and conifer forests in the Black Sea region and northeastern Turkey, oak and pine forests in the hinterlands of the Black Sea, and dry forests in East Anatolia. In elevation, these habitats range from 500 to 2,700 m (1,600 to 8,900 ft). In Iran, it is present in the Central Alborz Protected Area (south of the Caspian Sea), and in the Zagros Mountains. In these regions, it prefers higher altitudes and northern aspects with access to water resources.

== Threats ==
In Turkey, the bear is threatened by large-scale forest fragmentation, habitat degradation, and persecution in areas where it damages beehives and livestock. Local people in the Black Sea region hunt bears illegally for bear fat, which is thought to have medicinal value. Occasionally, bears are killed during hunts for wild boar using dogs, and by poisoned baits and snares set illegally for red deer, roe deer, wolf, or lynx.

In 2018, a sleeping Syrian brown bear was killed by Iraqi forces at the Iraq-Syria border.

In the spring of 2015, three Syrian brown bears were shot and killed in the northern Iranian county of Savadkuh.

== In culture ==
The Syrian brown bear is the bear mentioned in the Bible. The protectiveness of a mother bear towards her cubs is cited proverbially three times (2 Sam. 17:8; Hos. 13:8; Prov. 17:12) in the Hebrew Bible. Two female Syrian brown bears are also mentioned in 2 Kings 2:23-25, mauling 42 young boys to death for 'mocking' Elisha's baldness.

Insignia of the 22nd Artillery Supply Company of 2nd Polish Corps depicting Wojtek carrying an artillery shell

Wojtek (/ˈvɔj.tɛk/; 1942–1963), a Syrian brown bear purchased as a cub by Polish soldiers in Iran during World War II, became the unofficial mascot of the Polish II Corps with the rank of private. Known for his friendly demeanor and unique behaviors, Wojtek often showered, traveled in truck cabs, and wrestled with soldiers. He had his own allotment of cigarettes, which he chewed, and enjoyed fruits, sweet syrups, marmalade, honey, and beer as rewards. Though he sometimes caused mischief, such as rummaging through provisions and stealing female undergarments, he was generally gentle and trusted by the soldiers. Wojtek ate, slept, and spent time with the soldiers, preferring their company at night even after being provided his own sleeping quarters. According to stories, Wojtek detected an Arab spy at one point and carried artillery shells during the Battle of Monte Cassino. He was subsequently promoted to corporal. After the war, Wojtek retired to the Edinburgh Zoo, where he became a popular and beloved attraction. His military service is memorialized in Poland, Scotland, England, and Italy.
