= Kingwood, West Virginia =

City in West Virginia, US

- City
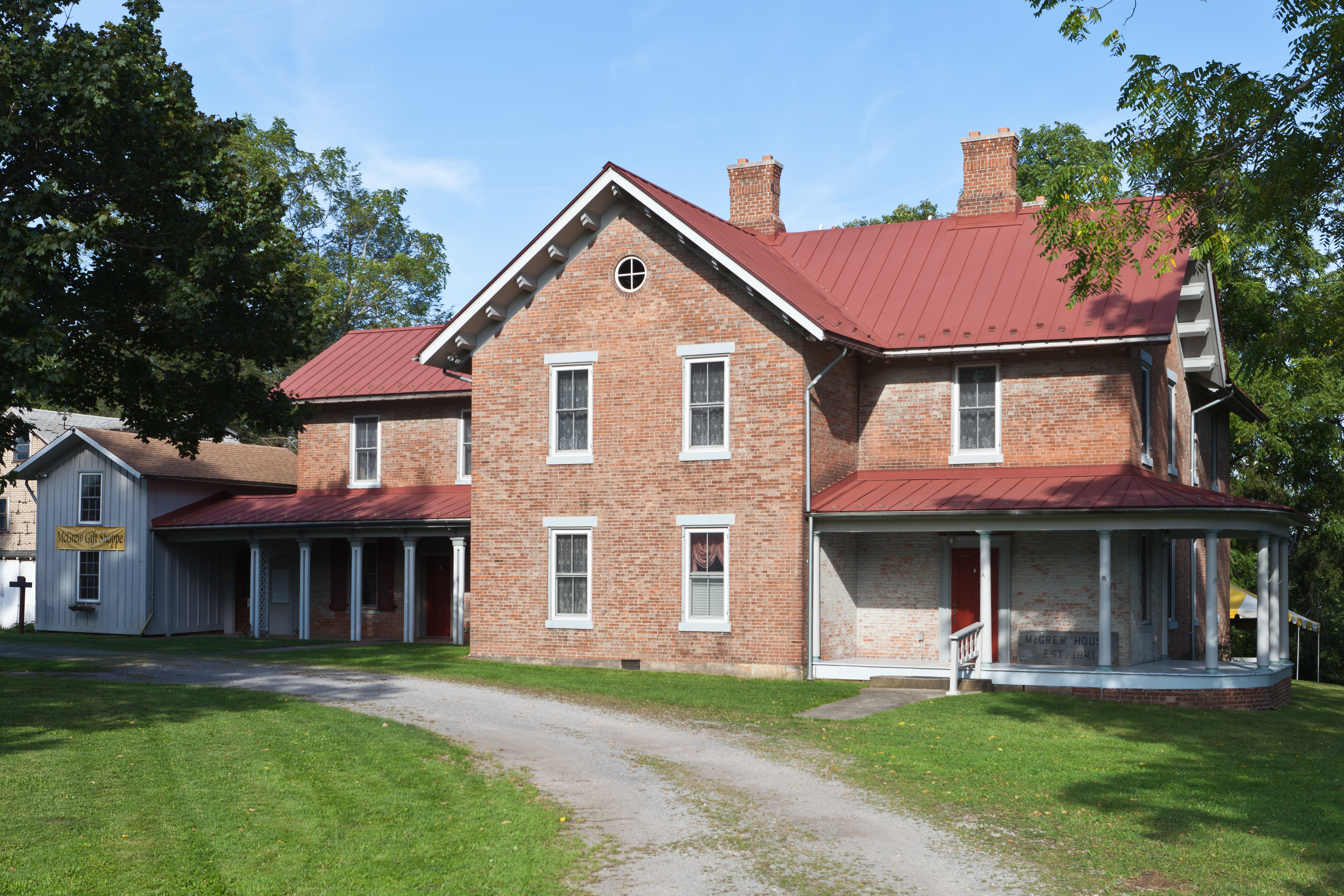
- James Clark McGrew House
- Interactive map of Kingwood, West Virginia
- Location in West Virginia Location in the United States
- Coordinates: 39°28.3′N 79°41.1′W
- Country: United States
- State: West Virginia
- County: Preston
- Settled: 1807
- Incorporated (town): January 23, 1811
- Incorporated (city): 1853
- Named after: A grove of tall, stately trees

Area
  - Total: 2.43 sq mi (6.29 km^{2})
  - Land: 2.43 sq mi (6.29 km^{2})
  - Water: 0 sq mi (0.00 km^{2})
- Elevation: 1,814 ft (553 m)

Population (2020)
  - Total: 2,980
  - Estimate (2021): 3,090
  - Density: 1,258.0/sq mi (485.73/km^{2})
- Time zone: UTC-5 (Eastern (EST))
  - Summer (DST): UTC-4 (EDT)
- ZIP code: 26537
- Area code: 304
- FIPS code: 54-44044
- GNIS feature ID: 1541229
- Website: www.kingwoodwv.org

Kingwood is a city in Preston County, West Virginia, United States, and its county seat. The population was 2,980 at the 2020 census. The city sits within the Allegheny Mountains above the Cheat River valley. It hosts the annual Preston County Buckwheat Festival, a county fair known for making buckwheat pancakes.

== History ==
The site of Kingwood was once a forest owned partly by John Miller and Hugh Morgan. The Northwestern Turnpike leading from Winchester to Morgantown passed through the area. Kingwood was settled sporadically in the 1790s and 1800s until it was formally established by the Virginia General Assembly on January 23, 1811. It was named for a grove of tall, stately trees. The town was made the county seat of the new Preston County in 1818, and chartered in 1853.

The James Clark McGrew House was listed on the National Register of Historic Places in 1993; the Kingwood Historic District was added in 1994.

== Geography ==
Kingwood is located at 39°28.3′N 79°41.1′W (39.4713, -79.6848).

According to the United States Census Bureau, the city has a total area of 2.43 square miles (6.29 km^{2}), all land. It has a warm-summer humid continental climate (Dfb) and average monthly temperatures range from 28.7 °F in January to 70.2 °F in July. The local hardiness zone is 6a.

== Demographics ==
Historical population
| Census | Pop. | Note | %± |
|---|---|---|---|
| 1880 | 365 | | — |
| 1900 | 700 | | — |
| 1910 | 800 | | 14.3% |
| 1920 | 1,417 | | 77.1% |
| 1930 | 1,709 | | 20.6% |
| 1940 | 1,676 | | −1.9% |
| 1950 | 2,186 | | 30.4% |
| 1960 | 2,530 | | 15.7% |
| 1970 | 2,550 | | 0.8% |
| 1980 | 2,877 | | 12.8% |
| 1990 | 3,243 | | 12.7% |
| 2000 | 2,944 | | −9.2% |
| 2010 | 2,939 | | −0.2% |
| 2020 | 2,980 | | 1.4% |
| 2021 (est.) | 3,090 | | 3.7% |
U.S. Decennial Census

=== 2020 census ===
As of the 2020 census, Kingwood had a population of 2,980. The median age was 45.4 years. 20.8% of residents were under the age of 18 and 25.4% of residents were 65 years of age or older. For every 100 females there were 88.5 males, and for every 100 females age 18 and over there were 82.3 males age 18 and over.

0.0% of residents lived in urban areas, while 100.0% lived in rural areas.

There were 1,257 households in Kingwood, of which 28.0% had children under the age of 18 living in them. Of all households, 44.3% were married-couple households, 15.5% were households with a male householder and no spouse or partner present, and 31.8% were households with a female householder and no spouse or partner present. About 31.5% of all households were made up of individuals and 15.8% had someone living alone who was 65 years of age or older.

There were 1,443 housing units, of which 12.9% were vacant. The homeowner vacancy rate was 2.5% and the rental vacancy rate was 10.3%.

Racial composition as of the 2020 census
| Race | Number | Percent |
|---|---|---|
| White | 2,812 | 94.4% |
| Black or African American | 13 | 0.4% |
| American Indian and Alaska Native | 2 | 0.1% |
| Asian | 6 | 0.2% |
| Native Hawaiian and Other Pacific Islander | 1 | 0.0% |
| Some other race | 5 | 0.2% |
| Two or more races | 141 | 4.7% |
| Hispanic or Latino (of any race) | 36 | 1.2% |

=== 2010 census ===
As of the census of 2010, there were 2,939 people, 1,291 households, and 818 families living in the city. The population density was 1,209.5 inhabitants per square mile (467.0/km^{2}). There were 1,454 housing units at an average density of 598.4 per square mile (231.0/km^{2}). The racial makeup of the city was 97.3% White, 0.9% African American, 0.1% Native American, 0.5% Asian, 0.1% from other races, and 1.0% from two or more races. Hispanic or Latino of any race were 0.5% of the population.

There were 1,291 households, of which 27.2% had children under the age of 18 living with them, 47.1% were married couples living together, 11.8% had a female householder with no husband present, 4.5% had a male householder with no wife present, and 36.6% were non-families. 30.5% of all households were made up of individuals, and 15.2% had someone living alone who was 65 years of age or older. The average household size was 2.28 and the average family size was 2.80.

The median age in the city was 43.8 years. 19.6% of residents were under the age of 18; 8.7% were between the ages of 18 and 24; 23.4% were from 25 to 44; 28.5% were from 45 to 64; and 19.9% were 65 years of age or older. The gender makeup of the city was 46.8% male and 53.2% female.

=== 2000 census ===
As of the census of 2000, there were 2,944 people, 1,283 households, and 844 families living in the city. The population density was 1,192.9 people per square mile (460.2/km^{2}). There were 1,417 housing units at an average density of 574.2 per square mile (221.5/km^{2}). The racial makeup of the city was 97.69% White, 1.02% African American, 0.44% Asian, 0.07% from other races, and 0.78% from two or more races. Hispanic or Latino of any race were 0.34% of the population.

There were 1,283 households, out of which 28.7% had children under the age of 18 living with them, 50.5% were married couples living together, 12.3% had a female householder with no husband present, and 34.2% were non-families. 31.1% of all households were made up of individuals, and 15.6% had someone living alone who was 65 years of age or older. The average household size was 2.28 and the average family size was 2.83.

In the city, the population was spread out, with 22.3% under the age of 18, 7.5% from 18 to 24, 25.6% from 25 to 44, 26.3% from 45 to 64, and 18.3% who were 65 years of age or older. The median age was 42 years. For every 100 females, there were 84.1 males. For every 100 females age 18 and over, there were 81.8 males.

The median income for a household in the city was $29,155, and the median income for a family was $36,313. Males had a median income of $30,658 versus $18,190 for females. The per capita income for the city was $16,299. About 16.3% of families and 17.0% of the population were below the poverty line, including 25.2% of those under age 18 and 13.6% of those age 65 or over.

== Arts and culture ==
The Kingwood National Bank Building (1908), part of the Kingwood Historic District

The annual Preston County Buckwheat Festival takes place in Kingwood over the last weekend of September. Farmers in the county grew buckwheat during the Great Depression to stimulate agricultural economic growth, with the festival starting in 1938 as an end-of-harvest celebration. The festival resembles a county fair, with livestock exhibitions and carnival rides. The festival also features three days of parades. Thousands of the namesake buckwheat pancake meals are prepared for the event.

Kingwood is home to Hovatter's Wildlife Zoo, also known as the West Virginia Zoo.

== Education ==
Kingwood contains three public schools serviced by the Preston County Schools:

- Kingwood Elementary School – grades K-4
- Central Preston Middle School – grades 5-8
- Preston High School – grades 9-12

== Notable people ==
- Robert E. Lee Allen, U.S. Representative from West Virginia's 2nd district
- William G. Brown Sr., U.S. Representative from Virginia's 15th, Virginia's 10th, and West Virginia's 2nd district
- William G. Brown Jr., U.S. Representative from West Virginia's 2nd district
- William G. Conley, 18th Governor of West Virginia
- Robert E. Cowan, lawyer, member of the Virginia House of Delegates from Preston County
- T. Stephen Crawford, chemical engineer known for his research in coal, coal tar and coal gasification
- Jonathan P. Dolliver, U.S. Senator from Iowa
- Robert Halbritter, member of the West Virginia House of Delegates and judge of the West Virginia Circuit Courts
- Izetta Jewel, actress and women's rights advocate
- Trena King, professional archer
- James McGrew, U.S. Representative from West Virginia's 2nd district and founding father of West Virginia
- Melvin C. Snyder, U.S. Representative from West Virginia's 2nd district and later judge
- Christopher Sperandio, artist
- David Sypolt, member of the West Virginia Senate from the 14th district
- William B. Zinn, member of the Virginia and West Virginia House of Delegates, and West Virginia Senate from Preston County; founding father of West Virginia

== See also ==
- List of cities in West Virginia
