= 2nd Mechanised Corps (Poland) =

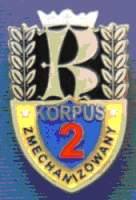
- Corps Badge
- Active: 2002–2014
- Country: Poland
- Branch: Polish Army
- Role: Mechanized infantry

The 2nd Mechanized Corps of Lieutenant General Władysław Anders (Polish: 2 Korpus Zmechanizowany imienia generała broni Władysława Andersa) was a corps-level formation of the Polish Army.

The 2nd Mechanised Corps was formed on the basis of the Air-Mechanized Corps and divisional units of the Silesian and the Pomeranian Military District. Two divisions and units of the types of forces and services were initially part of the corps. The body was ready for action with effect from 1 January 2002. The command of the garrison was located in Kraków. As part-owned structures in the period 1 January 2002 – 1 April 2004 2 Mechanized Corps was operational-tactical compound designed to conduct combat operations in the area of NATO alone and in cooperation with allied troops, fighting with enemy ground and air, as well as co-participation in resolving the situation crisis.

After the transfer in April 2004 of subordinate tactical and other military units in direct subordination of the commander of the Land Forces, the command of the 2nd Mechanised Corps was dedicated to the organization and conduct training and exercises for selected commands and operational-tactical units of the Land Forces and ad hoc task forces created clusters.

The 2nd Mechanised Corps cooperates with similar Headquarters within NATO. 2nd Mechanised Corps was the first operational-tactical compound of the Polish Army, which received the affirmation of NATO during the exercise "Cannon Cloud 2002" (November 2002). Thus it confirmed its readiness to command allied operational groups and to participate in allied exercises in the role of leadership of the body. At the level of the Allied Command of the 2nd Mechanized Corps, together with the I. German/Dutch Corps and the Italian NRDC-IT part of the working group set up by the Allied Command Operations in the field of exercise, training and coordination of the development of normative documents.

The godmother of the standard 2 KZ was the actress Anna Dymna.

== Corps commanders ==
- gen. dyw. Mieczysław Stachowiak (2001–2004)
- gen. broni Mieczysław Bieniek (2004–2007)
- gen. dyw. Włodzimierz Potasiński (cz.p.o. 2007)
- Brigadier General Andrzej Knap (p.o. 2007)
- gen. dyw. Edward Gruszka (2007–2009)
- gen. dyw. Zbigniew Głowienka (2009–2010)
- gen.dyw. dr Jerzy Biziewski (1 June 2010 – 26 July 2013)
- Brigadier General Andrzej Knap (26 July 2013 – 19 February 2014)
- gen.dyw. Janusz Adamczak (19 February 2014 – 1 July 2014) Last
