= Henryk Jordan Park =

City park in Kraków, Poland

Coordinates: 50°03′46″N 19°54′58″E

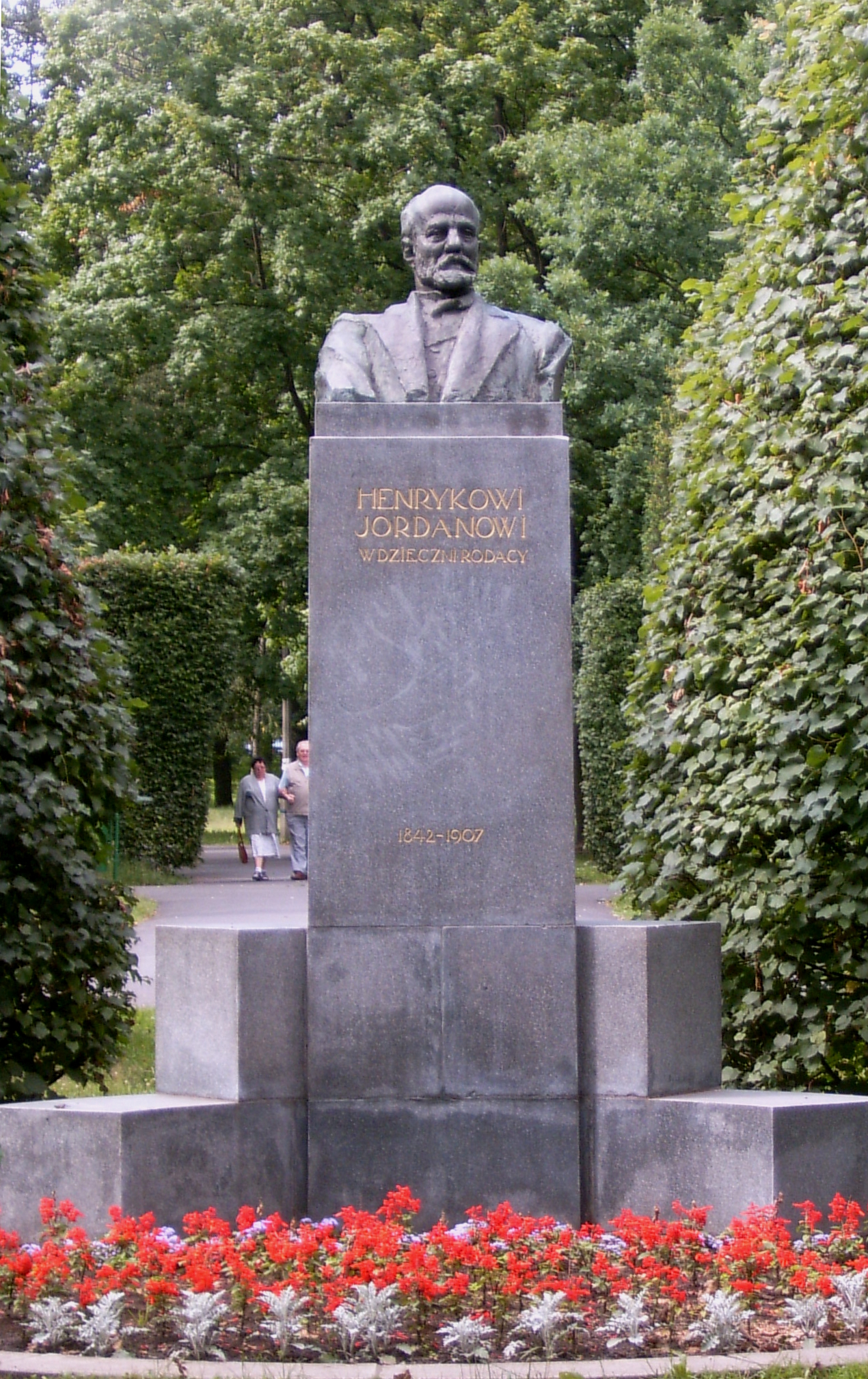
Monument to Jordan in Kraków's Jordan Park

Henryk Jordan Park (Polish: Park im. Henryka Jordana w Krakowie) was established in 1889 as the first public playground in Kraków, Poland, and the first of its kind in Europe. It was equipped with exercise fixtures modeled after those of similar playgrounds in the United States. The park is located in Kraków’s Błonia (municipal grasslands that had previously served as cattle pasture).

== History ==
The original Jordan Park included a swimming pool, 12 playing and soccer fields, as well as numerous running and exercise tracks. Facilities were added for indoor activities in 1906, in case of bad weather. The park was also equipped with locker rooms and showers. On top of that, a free meal service was established for the children.

Jordan Park was set up by physician and physical education pioneer Dr. Henryk Jordan, brought to completion with the help from the director of Kraków City Parks, Bolesław Malecki.

The concept of Jordan’s Gardens became very popular throughout interwar Poland. Similar gardens were opened in Warsaw, Płock, Kalisz and Lublin. In 1928 the Society of Jordan’s Gardens was established to oversee the building of all recreational facilities in the country.

== Concept ==
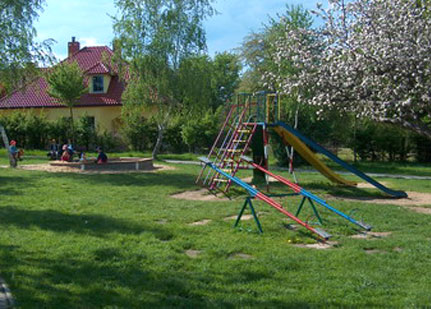
A contemporary Polish Jordan park

The most innovative aspect of Jordan's idea of public parks was perhaps the change in public's perception: stressing the importance of physical education and making people realize that physical exercise is equally important to the intellectual development of children while shaping their personality.

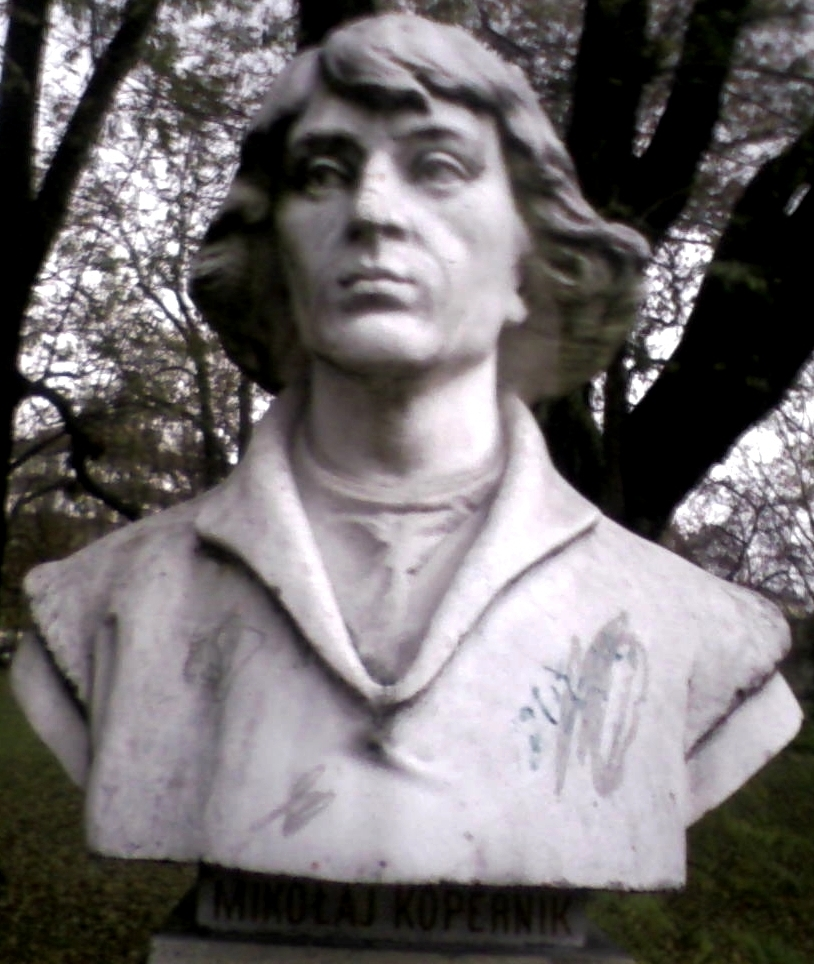
Bust of Mikołaj Kopernik in Kraków's Jordan Park

Since the beginning, Jordan Park ran programs based solely on games and exercises. Classes were originally run by students of Kraków's universities, whose work was supervised personally by Jordan. There were 14 fields of different shapes and sizes in the park and many gymnastics devices. The main focus was on games so that the participants wouldn't feel pressured but rather spent time exercising in a pleasant way. They practiced the javelin throw, archery, and organized walking on stilts, but also played team sports based on field competition. Soccer, cricket and tennis were introduced, as well as common games such as "Chinese wall", "cat and mouse" and many others. Activities were to be learned and practiced outside the park as well, even if there weren't any sport facilities nearby.

In the middle of the park was a circular labyrinth of trimmed hornbeams (bot. Carpinus betulus) with a flower bed in its center. From 1907, there were 45 busts of famous Poles displayed in the park, ordered by Jordan and made by sculptors Alfred Daun and Michal Korpal.

On 21 June 1914 a monument of the founder Henryk Jordan, designed by Jan Szczepkowski, was unveiled in the center of the labyrinth on the park's 25th anniversary. During World War II the park was devastated but the 22 busts and the monument of Jordan were saved by F. Łuczywo. After the war, the area of the park was enlarged to 21 hectares (52 acres), and the Society of Jordan’s Gardens reestablished. New playing fields and sports venues were added, including a toboggan slide, amphitheatre, and bicycle tracks. The center point of the park is a man-made pond, a place for group activities such as boat rowing and water bicycles.

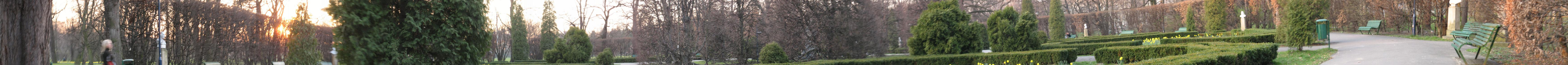
Panorama of Jordan Park walkway, Kraków
