= Cultural impact of the Falklands War =

Effect of the 1982 conflict on culture in Britain and Argentina

The cultural impact of the Falklands War spanned several media in both the United Kingdom and Argentina. The 1982 conflict produced films, television dramas and documentaries in both countries, as well as novels, poetry, comics, plays, war art and a substantial body of popular music. It also shaped press coverage, sporting rivalries and public commemoration, and left a mark on the English language through terms such as "yomp" and "Exocet".

On 4 May 1982, the British tabloid newspaper The Sun ran the headline "Gotcha" in reference to the sinking of the General Belgrano. The headline has been described as an encapsulation of a section of British opinion at the time and has become a widely cited example of British front-page history.

== Arts, entertainment, and electronic media ==
=== Films and television ===
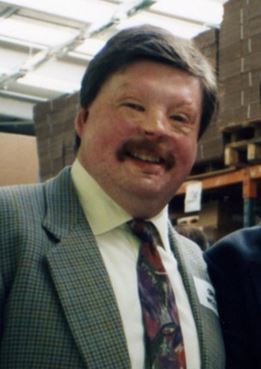
Simon Weston, British war veteran

A number of films and television productions emerged from the conflict. Notable examples include:

- Simon Weston, a Welsh Guardsman who had suffered serious burns during the bombing of Sir Galahad, became a popular figure due to British media coverage. A series of television documentaries followed the progress of rehabilitation and eventual recovery from his injuries, the first being Simon's War (6 April 1983) in BBC One's QED series.
- The 1983 British film The Ploughman's Lunch is set in the media and political world at the time of the war, which it compares to the 1956 Suez War.
- "A Game of Soldiers," by Jan Needle, a three-part story in the Thames Television schools series Middle English, was broadcast on the ITV network in September–October 1983. It tells the story of a group of Falkland children who find a wounded Argentinian conscript in hiding after the cessation of hostilities because he is afraid to surrender to the British.
- The first Argentine film about the war was Los chicos de la guerra (The Boys of the War), directed by Bebe Kamin in 1984.
- The film version of Whoops Apocalypse (1986) features a conflict very similar to the Falklands War between the United Kingdom and the fictional Caribbean country of Maguadora over the equally fictional Santa Maya.
- The BBC drama Tumbledown (31 May 1988) told the story of Robert Lawrence MC, a junior officer in the Scots Guards (Colin Firth) left paralysed down his left side by a gunshot wound to the head inflicted by an Argentine soldier on Mount Tumbledown, during the final push for Stanley, and his adjustment to disabled life after the war.
- Harley Cokeliss' horror film Dream Demon (1988) depicts a planned marriage between the main character and a Falklands War veteran.
- The 1989 British film Resurrected, directed by Paul Greengrass, had David Thewlis as a British soldier previously presumed dead in the war reappearing alive weeks after the end of the conflict.
- In the American/British film For Queen and Country (1989) starring Denzel Washington, Reuben is a St. Lucia-born British ex-para finding it difficult to adjust to civilian life some years after the war. The film deals with the poverty, crime, and racism that Reuben encounters back home and how he is ignored by both society and government despite his service.
- The BBC film An Ungentlemanly Act (13 June 1992) depicts the events leading up to and during the initial occupation of the Islands by Argentine forces. Based on true events, the film was produced to mark the 10th anniversary of the conflict and starred actors Ian Richardson as Governor Rex Hunt and Bob Peck as Major Mike Norman.
- The Cracker episode "Brotherly Love" (1995) features a psychologically damaged veteran from the Falklands War, Barney (Ron Donachie), who gets into a brief argument with DS Jimmy Beck (Lorcan Cranitch) and flies into an insane rage when Beck shows no interest in Barney's exploits in the war.
- Although the drama by Ian Curteis that became known simply as The Falklands Play was originally commissioned by the BBC in 1983, it was then temporarily set aside until 1985. The Corporation subsequently gave a number of reasons why it could not be made, including that it would have been broadcast too close to the 1987 General Election. Curteis maintained that the generally sympathetic portrayal of Margaret Thatcher and his refusal to include material that was contrary to both the official record and what his interviews with the major protagonists had revealed, went against a perceived BBC anti-government bias, citing the fact that Tumbledown — which he and others claimed was more "anti-establishment" — was made and broadcast. Curteis' play was eventually recorded in a truncated form and screened by the digital satellite channel BBC Four in 2002.
- The 2005 Argentine film Iluminados por el fuego (literally "Lit by Fire", released in English speaking countries as Blessed by Fire), directed by Tristán Bauer and starring Gastón Pauls, is a docudrama based on the autobiographical novel of the same name by Argentine Falklands veteran Edgardo Esteban, who fought in the conflict as an 18-year-old conscript. It received a San Sebastián Festival special award. The film tells about a veteran's memories, re-awakened after he learns of the suicide of a former soldier comrade. The movie gave a realistic portrait of the extreme weather and psychologically stressful conditions the Argentine soldiers faced in the field, the brutality and indifference to the suffering of the soldiers by their leaders, and the horrors of modern conflict. The movie won several awards, including a Goya.
- The 2006 British film This Is England, directed by Shane Meadows, is set in July 1983 in a small town in England and includes documentary footage and extracts from radio broadcasts about the Falklands War. The main character of the film is 12-year-old Shaun, whose father was killed fighting in the war.
- The British science fiction series Ashes to Ashes uses the Falklands War as a backdrop during its second series.
- BBC motoring show Top Gear visited Argentina in 2014 to film a Christmas special episode. However, the presenters' cars' number plates were seen as references to Falklands War. Presenter Jeremy Clarkson's Porsche 928's original number plate "H982 FKL" was seen as a direct reference to the conflict. Upon reaching Ushuaia, from where the General Belgrano departed on its final voyage, an angry mob confronted them. The three presenters were forced to abandon their cars, which were pelted with rocks from demonstrators, and catch the last plane to Buenos Aires and flee to Chile. A film crew of 30, which was left behind, was escorted to the Chilean border by local police overland.
- The Falklands War is a significant episode of the 2011 biographical film The Iron Lady, depicting the life and career of former British Prime Minister Margaret Thatcher.
- The 2013 Argentine miniseries Combatientes (Combatants), depicting an Argentine conscript.
- In the 2015 TV show Blunt Talk protagonist, Walter Blunt (Played by Patrick Stewart) is a former Royal Marines major and veteran of the Falklands War along with his valet Harry Chandler (Played by Adrian Scarborough), a former Royal Marines lance corporal.
- In episodes 4 and 5 of the fourth season of the Netflix series The Crown the Falklands War plays a major role. In episode 4 Margaret Thatcher demands action to recover the Falkland Islands after the invasion by Argentina. In episode 5 she discusses the recapture with the Queen and organizes a victory parade without inviting the Queen to attend.
- The 2020 Argentine documentary Good Night Malvinas (Spanish: Buenas noches Malvinas) focuses on the Falklands War.
- The 2025 adaptation of The Eternaut depicts flashbacks of the war experienced by Juan Salvo, a veteran with PTSD.

=== Games ===
- The computer games Harrier Attack (1983) and Yomp presented unofficial portraits of the fighting.
- The naval strategy game Strike Fleet (1987) includes a scenario set in the Falklands, where the player takes control of British destroyers under attack from Argentine submarines.
- The naval strategy game Janes' Fleet Command includes a scenario set in the Falklands, where the player controls the entire naval force, from Carriers to Destroyers and Aircraft.
- The naval tactical game Harpoon 4 has an extension book named "South Atlantic War: Battle for the Falklands" which comprises numerous scenarios and historical details about the conflict. The second edition was published in 2002 by Clash of Arms Games.
- Malvinas 2032, developed by Sabarasa, is a real-time strategy game, in which the player has to command the Argentine forces and re-take the Falkland Islands for Argentina.
- The Falklands War - 1982 scenario collection, created with the Harpoon3 naval warfare simulator, is intended to accurately recreate the real-life war from 1982.
- The Falklands War 1982 was published by Shrapnel games.
- Port Stanley: Battle for the Falklands (1984), a battalion level board war game of the land campaign, was published by 3W.
- John Tiller's Squad Battles Falklands is a turn-based, realistic videogame based on the Falklands land war.
- Falklands '82 (1986) by Personal Software Services.
- Project Reality v1.4 includes multiple maps based on the Falkland conflict

=== Literature ===
==== Fiction ====
- Jack Higgins' thriller Exocet (1983) deals with one of the war's most famous "buzz-words"; for many years afterwards, "Exocet" became synonymous with "missile" in the UK. ("Yomp" and "Task Force" also entered the lexicon.)
- Pierre Boulle's novel La Baleine des Malouines (1983), translated in the UK as The Falklands Whale and in the US as The Whale of the Victoria Cross, is about a blue whale which befriends the British task force.
- The comic strip Bloom County featured several story lines taking place during the Falklands War.
- Raymond Briggs' picture book The Tin-Pot Foreign General and the Old Iron Woman (1984) is a satire of the Falklands War.
- On Foreign Ground (1986) by Eduardo Quiroga, a novel in diary/letter form, tells of the war from the viewpoint of a young Argentine soldier.
- In Stephen King's novella The Langoliers (1990), the character Nick Hopewell is a Falklands veteran.
- Falklands 2: Argentina's Back and This Time It's Different (1997) by Jim Thorn is a technothriller about a fictional second invasion of the Falkland Islands.
- Las Islas (The Islands, 1998; translated 2012), a novel by Carlos Gamerro, is a satire of the war and the Argentine dictatorship, narrated by an Argentine veteran of the war.
- The first chapters of Chris Ryan's novel Land of Fire (2002) are set in the Falklands War, while the latter part involves a plot by a new military junta to re-invade the islands.
- The novel Ghost Force (2006) by Patrick Robinson depicts the Argentines reinvading the Falklands.
- David Mitchell's bildungsroman Black Swan Green (2006) is set in Worcestershire, England, in 1982, and contains many references to the Falklands War.
- Daniel E. Arias' novel That Forgotten Little War (2012) is about the intertwined lives of 14 participants in the Falkland War.
- The Captain's Story (2012) by Ray J. Cowling is a Falklands War novel about fictional Commander Mike Mansfield of the fictional Type 42 destroyer HMS Devonport.
- A Stone's Throw (2015) by Lee Watts is set mainly in Belfast during the troubles but has several chapters concerning the Falklands conflict and Mount Longdon.
- Ian McEwan's novel Machines Like Me (2019) is set in an alternate history in which Argentina won the Falklands War.
- Steven Taylor's novel Rock Scorpion (2024) is a spy thriller set in Gibraltar during the early stages of the Falklands War about a secret Argentine operation to sink the fictional supply ship RFA Fort Edward in Gibraltar harbour.

==== Non-fiction ====
The war provided a wealth of material for writers, and many dozens of books came from it; in the United Kingdom (UK) an account was Max Hastings and Simon Jenkins' The Battle for the Falklands. Major General Julian Thompson, of the Royal Marines, wrote his own account as commander in his 1985 book No Picnic: 3 Commando Brigade in the South Atlantic. Other titles focused on the Sea Harrier (Sharkey Ward's Sea Harrier over the Falklands), the land battles leading up to the Argentine surrender (Christian Jennings and Adrian Weale's Green Eyed Boys), and the general experience of battle and life in the surrounding area (Ken Lukowiak's A Soldier's Song and Marijuana Time). Vincent Bramley's "Forward into Hell" offers a less apologetic account of the War. In Argentina, one of the best-known is Commodore Pablo Carballo's Halcones de Malvinas, a collection of personal experiences of fighter pilots and many others and mandatory reading for admission to the FAA's Escuela de Aviación Militar.

==== Poetry ====
The Argentine writer Jorge Luis Borges, himself partly of British descent and raised bilingually in Spanish and English, wrote a short poem, called Juan López y John Ward (1985), about two fictional soldiers (one from each side), who died in the Falklands, in which he refers to "islands that were too famous". He also said about the war: "The Falklands thing was a fight between two bald men over a comb."

A large amount of poetry has been written on both sides, regarding the war. An Argentine example is "Elegy for the Argentine Dead Boys, in the South Atlantic" by Salvador Oria.

==== Comics ====
- The comic book Hellblazer, which unlike other comics, takes place in real time and shows present day crisis and contains social commentary about Britain. The Falklands War is one of those themes that were portrayed and mentioned upon in various issues and story arcs.
- The mini-series "Butcher, Baker, Candlestick Maker," later collected as Volume 10 of The Boys features the central character, Billy Butcher, as an enlisted man in the Falklands War. Butcher frequently refers to the other side as "Argeys."

=== Music ===
Music referencing the war includes:

- The song "El Aguante" by Puerto Rican band Calle 13 from their album Multi Viral, which references the war among other events that Latin America and the world have had to "deal with" or "endure" ("aguante" in Spanish).
- The Scottish Gaelic lament "Nam Aonar le mo Smuaintean" ("Alone with my Thoughts") was written in memory of Gordon MacPherson of Argyll, a boy fresh out of school who was killed in the Battle of the Two Sisters during the Falklands War. It reflects the grief Rev. Iain Macleod felt while writing in the wake of devastation the war left.
- The song "Glad It's All Over" (1984) by Captain Sensible, is about the Falklands War.
- The Argentine punk-rock band Los Violadores wrote the song "Comunicado #166" at their album Y ahora qué pasa ¿eh?. The song is critical of the military Junta, and the role of the United States. Pil Trafa, the lead singer, commented in 2001 that Argentina should not try to annex the islands, but rather improve as a country, so that the Falklanders themselves would emigrate to Argentina.
- The song "The Right Side Won" by Dutch reggae group "What Fun!", was inspired by the Falklands War. It made the BBC Radio 1 playlist, but was quickly removed when the content of the lyrics became apparent.
- The Falklands War provided much of the subject matter for Pink Floyd's album The Final Cut (1983), written by Roger Waters. The lyrics are highly critical of what it portrays as British jingoism and of the Thatcher government's actions. A specific lyric (from the song "Get Your Filthy Hands Off My Desert") protesting the sinking of ARA General Belgrano reads: "...Galtieri took the Union Jack. And Maggie, over lunch one day, took a cruiser with all hands... apparently to make him give it back."
- Pop musician Elvis Costello wrote the song "Shipbuilding" (1983) with Clive Langer in response to the Falklands War. The song was originally written for Robert Wyatt, whose version was released as a single in August 1982, a couple of months after the war had ended: Wyatt's recording was a Top 40 hit on the UK Singles Chart. Written from the point of view of workers in a depressed shipbuilding town, it points out that their jobs only come at the expense of the lives lost in the war. 1984's "Peace in Our Time" (released under Costello's alias The Imposter) also references the "tiny island invaded".
- Argentine rock musician Charly García recorded the song "No Bombardeen Buenos Aires" ("Do not bomb Buenos Aires") during the war and released it in his album Yendo De La Cama Al Living. The song is about the socio-political climate in Argentina during the war.
- Much material produced around this time by the anarchist punk band Crass was extremely critical of the war and its aftermath, in particular the album Yes Sir, I Will (1983) and the singles "Sheep Farming in the Falklands" and "How Does it Feel to be the Mother of 1,000 Dead?" The latter, intended as a statement directed at Mrs. Thatcher, led to questions in Parliament and a request for prosecution for obscenity from Conservative MP for Enfield North, Timothy Eggar. Crass were also responsible for Thatchergate, a hoax tape, originally attributed to the Soviet KGB, on which the spliced voice of Margaret Thatcher appears to imply that the destroyer HMS Sheffield was deliberately sacrificed in order to escalate the conflict.
- The folk rock band The Levellers wrote and produced the song "Another Man's Cause" featuring the lyrics "Your daddy well he died in the Falklands."
- Manchester group The Fall released the single "Marquis Cha-Cha" (1983), which tells the story of a Lord Haw-Haw type figure who broadcasts from Argentina but meets a sticky end.
- The song "Diego Paz wor nüngzehn" by German rock band BAP is about the Falklands War.
- British heavy metal band Iron Maiden recorded for their album Virtual XI (1998) a song called "Como Estais Amigos", about the Falklands War.
- Macclesfield-based punk band The Macc Lads penned a typically un-PC song called "Buenos Aires (1982, Falklands War Mix)" which included lyrics such as "Costa Mendez lives in fear / Of real men who can hold their beer!" and "hey hey hey / The lads are on their way / With their bayonets and tommy guns / and their bellies full of Boddingtons."
- Scottish anarcho-punk band Oi Polloi's song about one of the victims Simon Weston is also a clear condemnation of the war.
- Joe Jackson's song "Tango Atlantico" (from the 1986 album Big World) represents a look back at the Falklands War.
- The title track of The Exploited's album Let's Start a War (1983) directly addresses the Falklands War, implying Margaret Thatcher started it almost on a whim, for her own benefit and to take the focus away from other problems Britain was facing at the time, such as unemployment.
- On their album From Here to Eternity: Live (1999), The Clash substitute a line in the song "Career Opportunities" for "I don't wanna die, fighting in the Falkland Strait" which was a common ad-lib during their set at the time.
- Some people in Britain took the song "Six Months in a Leaky Boat" by the New Zealand pop group Split Enz to be a criticism of the war, and the song was banned by the BBC. The group denied that this was the song's intent particularly because the song was recorded earlier in 1982.
- "Fields of Fire" by Big Country, is about the Falklands War.
- The Dire Straits song "Brothers in Arms", written by Mark Knopfler, is about the Falklands War.
- Billy Bragg's song "Island of No Return", originally released on his 1984 album Brewing Up with Billy Bragg, was written from the point of view of a young soldier serving in the Falklands.
- Super Furry Animals' song "The Piccolo Snare" from their 2004 album Phantom Power was partly inspired by frontman Gruff Rhys' childhood memories about the Falklands War, as well as contemporary observations of the Iraq War.
- Los Angeles punk band NOFX's song "Ronnie & Mags" off of their 2012 album Self Entitled mentions the Falklands War multiple times, as it focuses on Ronald Reagan and Margaret Thatcher's relations.
- Vin Garbutt's song "Dark side of the Moon" on the 1999 album Word of Mouth
- The Sabaton song "Back in Control" on their 2006 album Attero Dominatus.
- Vampire Weekend's song "Mansard Roof" on their 2008 eponymous album references the conflict in the second verse of the song.
- John Cale's album Words for the Dying was written in 1982 as a response to the Anglo-Argentinian Falklands War, using poems written by fellow Welshman Dylan Thomas.
- The Fixx song "Liner" from the 1983 album Reach the Beach was heavily influenced by the Falklands War: "Island in a forgotten latitude and with colonial attitude they took the chance for repossession".
- Danish singer-songwriter C.V. Jørgensen included the song "Postkort fra Port Stanley" ("Postcard from Port Stanley") on his 1982 album Lediggang a go go, lambasting Margaret Thatcher.
- The Clash song "This Is England" mentions the overlook of social and economic major issues plaguing the UK due to the rise of British patriotism from the Falklands War, with the line, "I see no glory, when will we be free".
- In 2021, the Argentine pianist and composer Gabriel Lococo and the British musician Mark Slater created the album Temas Unidos, an anti-war conceptual album about the Falklands War whose royalties went to the families who lost their homes in Patagonia due to a forest fire.

=== Theatre ===
- British playwright Steven Berkoff wrote the highly critical satirical play Sink the Belgrano! (1986) about the British decision to go to war and the sinking of the Argentine cruiser General Belgrano.
- Lola Arias' play Minefield (2016) is a form of verbatim theatre project that brings together real soldiers from the war to perform and reimagine their experiences, exploring "what is left of [the Falklands/Malvinas war] in their heads 34 years later".

=== Visual arts ===
Linda Kitson was the official war artist accompanying British troops during the Falklands Conflict. She created over 400 drawings of the troops' daily life, many of which are now part of the Imperial War Museum's art collection and were exhibited to the general public in November 1982. They were featured again in the Museum's exhibition Women War Artists, in 2011–2012. All of Kitson's drawings which were not retained by the Museum were sold.

== Football ==
Tottenham Hotspur's popular Argentine midfielder Ossie Ardiles had helped beat Leicester City in an FA Cup semi-final one day after the invasion: whilst Ardiles was booed by the Leicester fans, who chanted "England, England, England" whenever he touched the ball, the Tottenham supporters responded by chanting "Argentina, Argentina, Argentina" in support of Ardiles. Two days later he left England to return to Argentina: according to him, this had already been arranged before the war so he could prepare with the Argentina national football team ahead of the 1982 FIFA World Cup. Whilst Tottenham's manager Keith Burkinshaw wanted Ardiles to return to the club for the next season, Ardiles felt unable to do this, and as a compromise it was agreed that he would instead go on loan to Paris Saint-Germain. However he would subsequently return to Tottenham, remaining with the club until 1988 and winning the UEFA Cup with them in 1984. His cousin José Ardiles, a fighter pilot, was killed during the early stages of the air campaign, becoming the first Argentine pilot to die in the war. Ardiles' countryman and Tottenham team-mate, Ricardo Villa, also chose to miss the 1982 FA Cup Final, and subsequently left the club in 1983. White, Blue and White, a documentary on Ardiles and Villa's experiences in England, including the period of the conflict, was produced for ESPN's 30 for 30 series.

Elsewhere, Stockport County stopped using their blue-and-white kit inspired by the Argentina national team, stating that playing in it "hardly seems appropriate, given the current circumstances". The war also created heightened passions between Argentina and England at the 1986, 1998 and 2002 FIFA World Cups, involving players such as Diego Maradona, Peter Shilton and David Beckham.

== State recognition ==
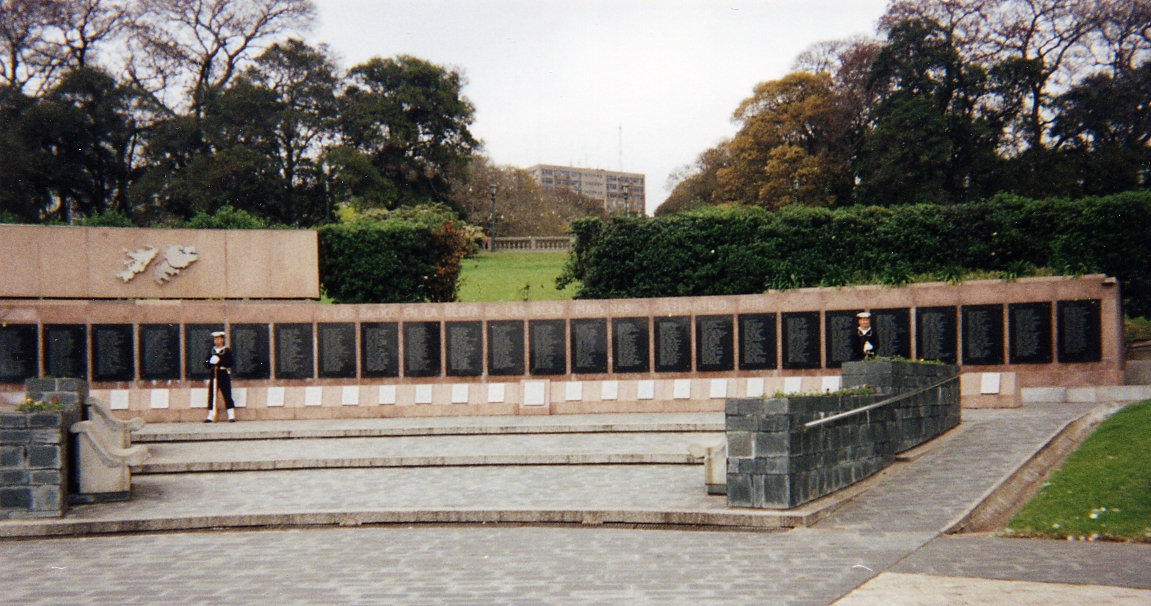
Monument to the Fallen Soldiers, Buenos Aires

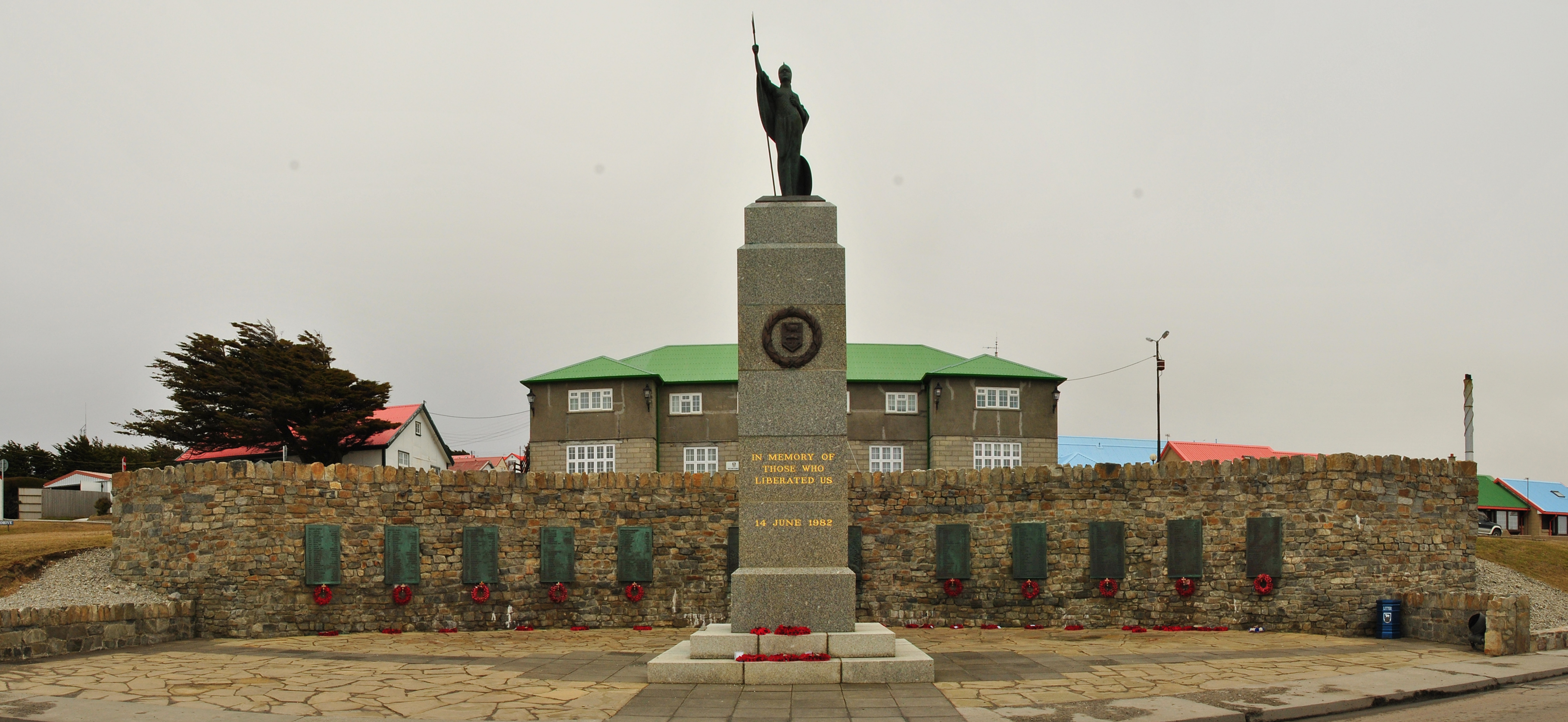
Liberation Memorial, Stanley

=== Holidays ===
The war is commemorated as Día del Veterano de Guerra y los Caídos en Malvinas (Veterans and Fallen Soldiers of the Falklands Day), a public holiday in Argentina, on 2 April. It is sometimes referred to as Malvinas Day.

In Britain, those who lost their lives are remembered as part of Remembrance Sunday.

In the Falkland Islands themselves, two holidays commemorate the war: Liberation Day on 14 June (or the first Monday afterward, if it falls on a weekend), a public holiday in the Falkland Islands, and Margaret Thatcher Day on 10 January.

=== Memorials ===
In the United Kingdom, there is a national memorial at Pangbourne College, a small co-educational public school in Berkshire; it is titled the Falkland Islands Memorial Chapel.

There are several memorials in the Falkland Islands, the most prominent of which is the 1982 Liberation Memorial in Stanley which was unveiled on 14 June 1984 (the second anniversary of the end of the war and liberation of the Falkland Islanders).

When the war started, a Buenos Aires street, "Calle Inglaterra" (England Street), was renamed "Calle 2 de Abril" (2 April Street), after the start date of the war. In November 2013, the street briefly reverted to its original name "Calle Inglaterra". But due to the resulting denunciations and fierce protests caused by this name, the same street was finally renamed in March 2014 as the "Pasaje 2 de Abril" by the Buenos Aires government, also because another street named "Calle 2 de Abril" already exists in Buenos Aires.

In 1982, after the Falklands War ended, the clock tower "Torre de los Ingleses" (Tower of the English), which was a gift from the local British community to the city of Buenos Aires in commemoration of the centennial of the May Revolution of 1810, was renamed as the "Torre Monumental" (Monumental Tower). At the same time, the "Plaza Británica" (British Square), where the tower is situated, was renamed as the "Plaza Fuerza Aérea Argentina" (Argentine Air Force Square). The Monument to the Fallen Soldiers was built in this square.

== Terminology ==
This war is occasionally written as The Falklands/Malvinas War, recognising the international split over the Islands' name. Other names such as Falklands Conflict and Falklands Crisis have also been used. The term Guerra de las Malvinas or Malvinas War is the one normally used in Spanish-speaking countries and has also been used by some socialist groups in English-speaking countries.

The name "Guerra del Atlántico Sur", meaning "War of the South Atlantic" is also used in Spanish. Unlike the term "Falklands/Malvinas War", this reflects the fact that some of the conflict occurred in South Georgia (which at the time was a dependency of the Falklands), and the deep ocean.
