= Liberation Day =

Holiday marking a country's liberation

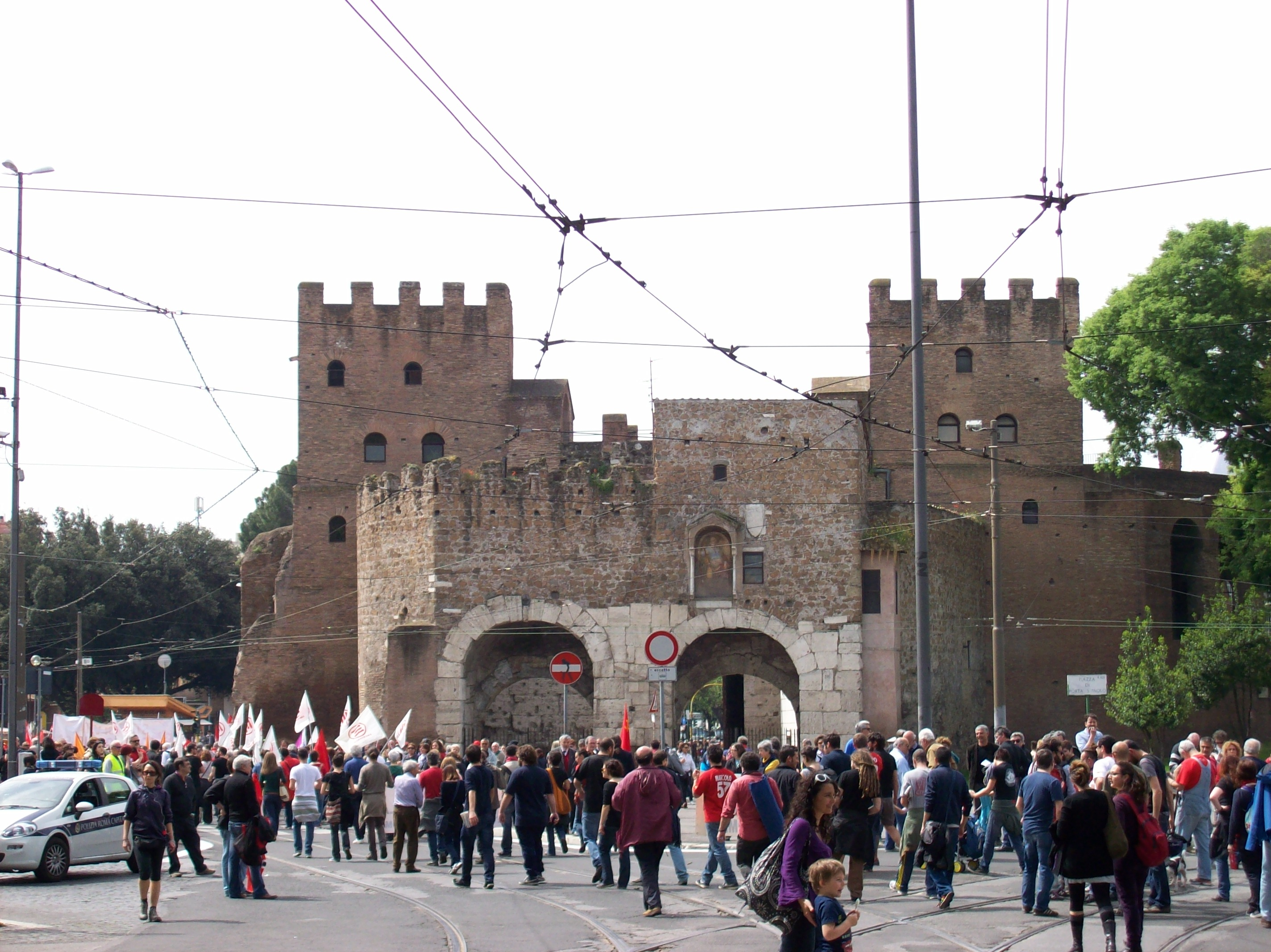
Celebrations of the Italian Liberation Day at Porta San Paolo in Rome, 2013

Liberation Day is a day, often a public holiday, that marks the liberation of a place, similar to an independence day, but differing from it because it does not involve the original creation of statehood. It commemorates the end of an occupation (as in the Falkland Islands) or the fall of a regime (as in Portugal) or the liberation from both a foreign occupation and a collaborationist regime (as in France and Italy).

== List ==
Country	Date	Year	Event	Name of holiday
Afghanistan	February 15	1989	Soviet Union withdrawal from Afghanistan	
Albania	November 29	1944	Liberation from Nazi Germany	Dita e Çlirimit or Liberation Day
Bangladesh	December 16	1971	Liberation from Pakistan	Bijoy Dibosh in Bangladesh and Vijay Diwas in India's West Bengal, or Victory Day
Belarus	July 3	1944	Liberation from Nazi Germany	Republic Day or Independence Day
Bulgaria	March 3	1878	Creation of the Principality of Bulgaria	Liberation Day
Cambodia	January 7	1979	Liberation from the Khmer Rouge	Victory Day
Congo, Democratic Republic of the	May 17	1997	Takeover of Kinshasa by Laurent-Désiré Kabila following the First Congo War	Liberation Day
Cuba	January 1	1959	Cuban Revolution under the leadership of Fidel Castro	Triunfo de la Revolución or Triumph of the Revolution
Czech Republic	May 8	1945	Liberation from Nazi Germany	Den osvobození (Liberation Day)
Denmark	May 5	1945	Liberation from Nazi Germany	Befrielsesdagen or Liberation Day
Falkland Islands	June 14	1982	Liberation from Argentina	Liberation Day
France	August 25	1944	Liberation from Nazi Germany and the end of the Vichy Regime	
Greece	October 12	1944	Liberation from Nazi Germany	
Guam	July 21	1944	Liberation from Japan	Liberation Day
Guernsey (Channel Islands)	May 9	1945	Liberation from Nazi Germany	Liberation Day
Hong Kong	Last Monday in August	1945	Liberation from Japan, celebrated between 1945 and 1996 (no longer a holiday as of 1997)	Liberation Day (V-J Day 30 August)
Hungary	April 4	1945	Siege of Budapest, celebrated between 1950 and 1989 (no longer a holiday as of 1990)	Liberation Day
India	December 19 (Goa only)	1961	Liberation of Goa from Portugal	Goa Liberation Day
Indonesia	May 1	1963	United Nations Temporary Executive Authority transferred control of Western New Guinea to Indonesia in accordance with the terms of the New York Agreement following the joint Soviet–Indonesian invasion of Dutch New Guinea. The Act of Free Choice in 1969 would unanimously confirm the Indonesian annexation of the territory.	
Israel	28 Iyar	1967	Reunification of Jerusalem in the Six-Day War	Yom Yerushalayim (Jerusalem Day)
Italy	April 25	1945	The victory of the Italian resistance movement against Nazi Germany and the Italian Social Republic, puppet state of the Nazis and rump state of the fascists, culmination of the liberation of Italy from German occupation and of the Italian Civil War, in the latter phase of World War II.	Festa della Liberazione
Iraq	April 9	2003	Fall of Ba'athist Iraq.	"Baghdad Liberation Day"
Jersey (Channel Islands)	May 9	1945	Liberation from Nazi Germany	Liberation Day
North Korea; South Korea	August 15	1945	Liberation from Japan	Gwangbokjeol
Kuwait	February 26	1991	Liberation from Iraq	
Lebanon	May 25	2000	Withdrawal of the Israeli Forces from Lebanon	Liberation Day
Libya	October 23	2011	Muammar Gaddafi killed, ending the 2011 Libyan civil war	
North Macedonia	October 11	1941	Uprising Day in North Macedonia, the beginning of the National Liberation War of Macedonia	
Mali	November 19	1968	End of Modibo Keïta's regime	
Moldova	August 24	1944	Liberation from Nazi Germany	Liberation Day
Netherlands	May 5	1945	Liberation from Nazi Germany	Bevrijdingsdag or Liberation Day
Nicaragua	July 19	1979	Nicaraguan Revolution	
Northern Mariana Islands	July 4	1945	Liberation from Japan	
Norway	May 8	1945	Liberation from Nazi Germany	
Poland	November 11	1918	Gained independence from German Empire, Russian Empire, Austria-Hungary in the end of World War I after 123 years of occupation.	Dzień Niepodległości (Independence Day)
Portugal	April 25	1974	Fall of the Estado Novo (New State) fascist regime: known locally as the Carnation Revolution (Revolução dos Cravos)	Freedom Day
Rwanda	July 4	1994	Victory of the RPF, ending the Rwandan genocide	Liberation Day
Slovakia	May 8	1945	Liberation from Nazi Germany	Deň víťazstva nad fašizmom
South Georgia and the South Sandwich Islands	April 25	1982	Liberation from Argentina	
Syria	December 8	2024	End of the Ba'athist regime and Assad family rule	Liberation Day
Togo	January 13	1967	Military coup under the leadership of Etienne Eyadema	Jour de la Libération
Turkey	August 30	1922	End of the Turkish War of Independence	Zafer Bayramı (Victory Day)
Uganda	January 26	1986	End of Tito Okello's regime and the capture of power by the Museveni regime	
Ukraine	October 28	1944	Liberation from Nazi Germany completed as Red Army captures Chop	Liberation Day (Ukraine)
United States of America	April 2	2025	"Liberation Day" tariffs announced by United States president Donald Trump	
Vietnam	April 30	1975	"Day of liberating the South for national reunification"	Reunification Day

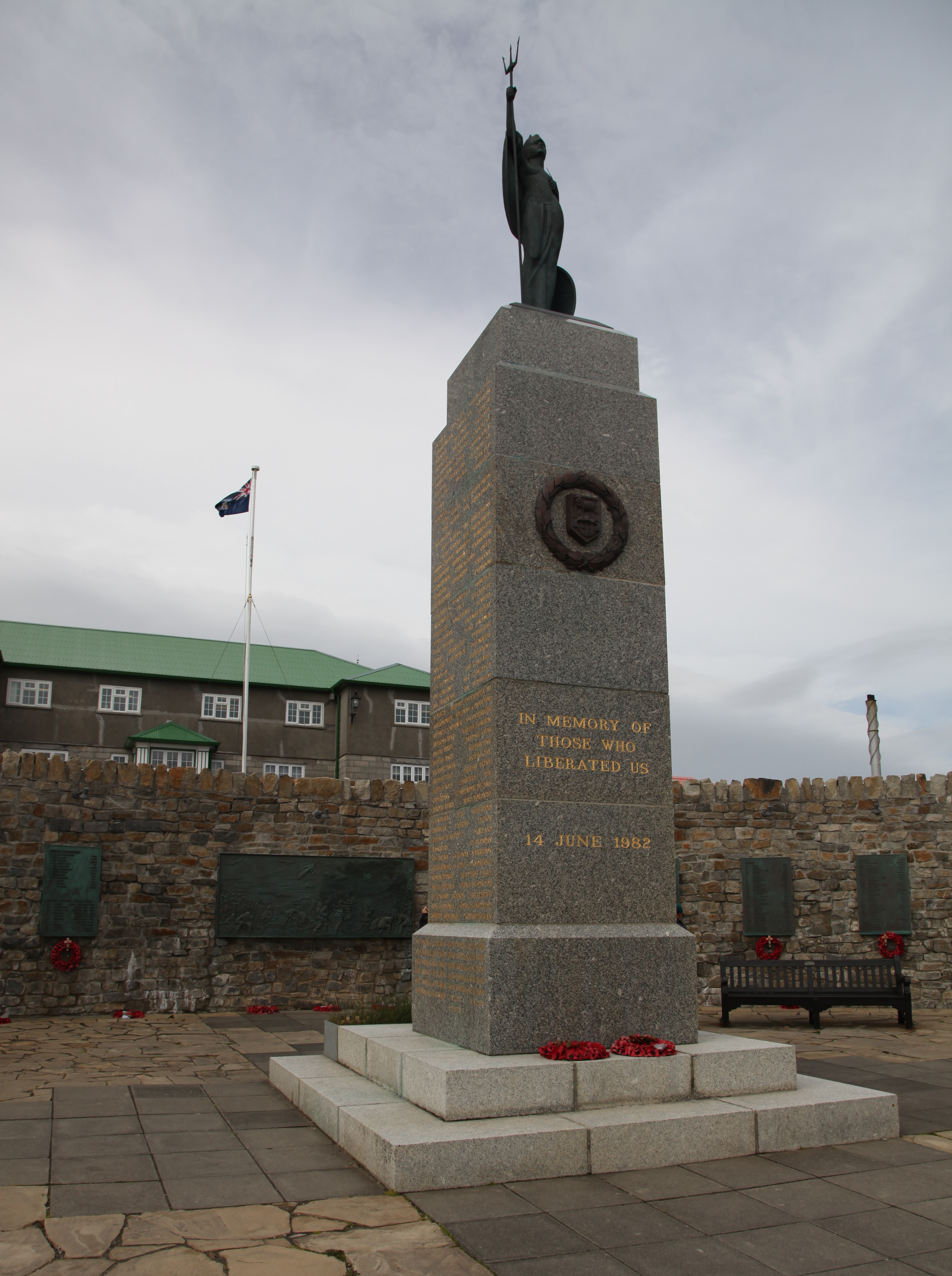
Liberation Memorial in Stanley, Falkland Islands

== See also ==
- National Day
- Revolution Day
