= The Falklands Play =

2002 British television play

- BBC DVD Cover
- Genre: Docudrama
- Written by: Ian Curteis
- Directed by: Michael Samuels
- Starring: Patricia Hodge; James Fox; Jeremy Child; Bob Sherman; John Standing
- Country of origin: United Kingdom
- Original language: English

Production
- Executive producer: Richard Fell
- Producer: Jeremy Howe
- Editor: Martin Sharpe
- Running time: 90 minutes

Original release
- Network: BBC Four
- Release: 10 April 2002

Related
- Tumbledown; An Ungentlemanly Act

The Falklands Play is a dramatic account of the political events leading to and during the 1982 Falklands War between the United Kingdom and Argentina. The play was written by Ian Curteis, who had started his television career in drama but had increasingly come to specialise in dramatic reconstructions of history. It was originally commissioned by the BBC in 1983 for production and broadcast in 1986, but was subsequently shelved by controller of BBC One Michael Grade due to its supposed support for the prime minister Margaret Thatcher and jingoism. This prompted a press furore over media bias and censorship. The play was not staged until 2002, when it was broadcast in separate adaptations on BBC Television and Radio. It was aired again on BBC4 on 1 December 2020, over 18 years after it was last transmitted.

== Plot ==
The play focuses on the British Prime Minister Margaret Thatcher and the British government's handling of the diplomatic breakdown over the Argentine invasion of the Falkland Islands (Spanish: Islas Malvinas), which was the United Kingdom's largest foreign affairs emergency since the 1956 Suez Crisis. In particular, it charts the behind-the-scenes dealings within Thatcher's Conservative government and between it and its military and the United States and Argentine governments in the diplomatic breakdown that gave way to war and an eventual British victory. In response to the Argentine invasion, the Thatcher government calls for a total maritime exclusion zone around the islands and directs a large naval force to set sail for the islands.

Lord Carrington offers his resignation as Foreign Secretary, taking responsibility for the failure to foresee the invasion, and Thatcher reluctantly accepts; his replacement Francis Pym is a reticent member of the war cabinet and cautions Thatcher against a military response, including in the presence of an American delegation under Alexander Haig. Haig enters the affair to attempt to mediate the dispute between Thatcher and the Argentine side, the latter led by the military dictator Leopoldo Galtieri. Secretary of State for Defence John Nott, acting on behalf of his government, demands the total withdrawal of the Argentine garrisons, in compliance with UN Resolution 502.

British response to the involvement of United Nations Secretary-General Pérez de Cuéllar is also portrayed. Other dramatic elements include portrayal of the internal dynamics of the war cabinet and the government's representations in the House of Commons in response to Argentine landings on the British island of South Georgia and their subsequent reclaiming by British forces, the sinking of the Argentine naval cruiser, the ARA General Belgrano, and the losses of British life when the British guided missile destroyer HMS Sheffield was struck by an Argentine Exocet missile. The drama ends with Thatcher's declaration of the end of hostilities in the House of Commons.

== Cast ==
- Patricia Hodge as Margaret Thatcher MP (Prime Minister)
- James Fox as Lord Carrington KCMG MC PC (Foreign Secretary)
- John Standing as William Whitelaw CH MC MP (Home Secretary)
- Michael Cochrane as Nicholas Ridley MP (Financial Secretary to the Treasury)
- Jeremy Child as Francis Pym MC MP (Lord President of the Council / Foreign Secretary)
- Rupert Vansittart as Sir Robert Armstrong (Cabinet Secretary)
- Jonathan Coy as Richard Luce MP (Minister of State, Foreign Office)
- Clive Merrison as John Nott MP (Secretary of State for Defence)
- Peter Blythe as Sir Michael Havers QC MP (Attorney-General)
- Jeremy Clyde as Sir Nicholas Henderson (Ambassador to the United States)
- Colin Stinton as Alexander Haig (US Secretary of State)
- Shaughan Seymour as Admiral Sir Henry Leach (First Sea Lord)
- Anthony Calf as Robin Fearn (Head of South America Department, Foreign Office)
- Jasper Jacob as John Wilkinson MP (Parliamentary Private Secretary to John Nott)
- Richard Cordery as Thomas O. Enders (US Assistant Secretary of State for Inter-American Affairs)
- Bob Sherman as Ronald Reagan (President of the United States)
- Lorelei King as Jeane Kirkpatrick (US Ambassador to the UN)
- Garrick Hagon as Vernon Walters (Senior Adviser to the US Secretary of State)
- Robert Hardy as Sir Anthony Parsons (HM Ambassador to the UN)
- Arturo Venegas as Javier Pérez de Cuéllar (UN Secretary-General)
- Vernon Dobtcheff as Nicanor Costa Méndez (Argentine Minister of External Relations)
- Robert Bowman as Hamilton Whyte (member, British Mission to the UN)
- John Woodvine as Admiral of the Fleet Sir Terence Lewin (Chief of the Defence Staff)
- Tom Chadbon as Admiral Sir John Fieldhouse (C-in-C Fleet)
- Gordon Langford Rowe as George Thomas MP (Speaker of the House of Commons)
- Patrick Godfrey as Michael Foot MP (Leader of the Opposition)
- Ron Meadows as Peter Shore MP (Shadow Chancellor of the Exchequer)
- Renny Krupinski as David Lambie MP (Labour)
- David Fleeshman as Denis Healey CH MBE MP (Deputy Leader of the Labour Party)
- Charles McCurdy as John Browne MP (Conservative)
- Martin Oldfield as Enoch Powell MP (Ulster Unionist)
- Geoffrey Wilkinson as Sir Anthony Meyer Bt MP (Conservative)
- Alan Rothwell as John Wells MP (Conservative)
- Geoff Holman as Tony Benn MP (Labour)

=== Uncredited ===
- Ray Donn as a government minister
- Leonard Silver as a government minister

== Production ==
On 22 October 1982, at a meeting of the Writer's Luncheon Club, BBC Director General Alasdair Milne gave a speech during which he praised Curteis's TV play Suez 1956 (shown three years earlier), which had dealt with the Suez Crisis from the political and diplomatic perspective, rather than the "action" on the ground. Curteis – who was present at the meeting – then sent Milne a copy of the published play, and as an afterthought said: "In a few years' time, I would like to write a similar sort of play about the Falklands Crisis." Milne immediately commissioned the play, and after months of careful negotiation the contract was signed on 6 April 1983. During discussions between Curteis and Keith Williams, the BBC Head of Plays, Cedric Messina was chosen as producer, but it was quickly realised that tempers were still running high about the War, particularly in relation to the BBC's conduct during it, and so it was mutually agreed to put the project on hold.

Curteis recommenced work on the play at the start of 1985, meeting many of the key players and visiting most of the locations that would be portrayed in the play. His research also involved reading most of what had already been published about the War, biographies of the chief protagonists, Hansard for the relevant Parliamentary debates, official reports, and the contemporary press coverage. He delivered the fourth draft of the script to the BBC in April 1986. The budget of £1 million was approved, Messina officially appointed as producer, and David Giles as director. Studio time was booked in TC1 at BBC Television Centre (one of the largest television studios in Europe) for 24 January to 8 February 1987 inclusive, with a planned transmission date of the following 2 April, the fifth anniversary of the Argentinian invasion. It was planned to last for around three hours, with a half-hour break for the Nine O'Clock News.

At a meeting with Milne on 2 June 1986, Curteis raised the question of the general election that was expected to happen the following year, and asked whether it might compromise the planned transmission date of the play. Milne dismissed the possibility of an election before the Autumn of 1987 at the earliest, and stated: "I don't see that transmission in April presents any problem."

In early July the new Head of Plays Peter Goodchild (whose background was in documentaries, rather than drama) requested considerable modifications to the script, amongst them objecting to the portrayal of Thatcher's "private and instinctive self" – as opposed to the "bellicose Iron Lady of the public scenes" – and requesting the inclusion of discussions between members of the government about the possible effect of the War on the 1983 general election. Curteis declined the latter on the grounds that none of the relevant people he had interviewed had alluded to such conversations, and that there was no other record of them. In addition, he considered that attributing such fictional dialogue to real people could be libellous, although he had been willing to do that for conversations between – variously – members of the Argentinian Junta, American envoy Alexander Haig, and the Pope due to the lack of source material.

On 21 July, while Curteis was on holiday in Ireland, the BBC cancelled the play, citing the forthcoming General Election. Curteis mounted a robust defence, and as the press became involved at the end of September, pressure mounted on the BBC, especially when it was discovered that they were going ahead with Charles Wood's Tumbledown, which was claimed to have an "anti-Mrs-Thatcher's-Government theme," even though at that point Wood's script had not been published and few people could have read it. Tumbledown had a planned transmission date in October 1987, closer to – if not coinciding with – the General Election than the planned broadcast of Curteis's play.

Bill Cotton, the BBC's Managing Director of Television, issued a statement claiming: "Ian Curteis completed the first draft of his Falklands Play three and a half years after we had commissioned it... In our professional opinion, it is not a completed commission." He also said it would be "irresponsible of the BBC at a time when the country is leading up to an election to embark on a play portraying a Prime Minister in office, other serving ministers and MPs." He finished by denying the play had been cancelled for any other reason, and refuted suggestions that Goodchild had asked for amendments that would change the political slant of the script. A second statement by a BBC spokesman also referred to Curteis's "draft script," and claimed: "No bookings had been made for studio time. It was too early for this to be done. There had been no commitment to the production of this play." All of these claims either misrepresented the facts, or were completely contrary to either them or the assurances Milne had previously given to Curteis.

Cotton later reiterated most of these points in a letter to The Sunday Telegraph on 22 February 1987, in which he also claimed that the BBC would be quite happy to release their rights to the play to another broadcaster, but they had had no such requests. In fact, there had been an approach from Anglia Television to buy the rights on the day the cancellation was announced, but it had been categorically refused "off the record" by Michael Grade, then Controller of BBC One. This was denied by Grade in a TV interview in 2002.

Coupled with the decision to continue with Tumbledown (although its transmission was eventually delayed until 31 May 1988), the whole furore led to accusations of censorship and left-wing bias at the BBC, particularly as the play depicted Thatcher as both a strong and sympathetic character. As arranged prior to the cancellation, the play was published in 1987 as a paperback by Hutchinson, but with the addition of an introduction by Curteis in which he gave his account of the whole affair.

In 1991, as part of a wider season of programmes about censorship, Channel 4 included a reading of some dialogue from the play in the documentary The Liberal Conspiracy, in which Curteis was also interviewed. Channel 4 was subsequently criticised on its viewer comment programme Right to Reply for not having made their own full production of the play for the same season, as they had done with another banned BBC programme (an episode of Duncan Campbell's Secret Society).

The Falklands Play was eventually produced simultaneously for both radio and television with almost identical casts, broadcast by BBC Radio 4 on 6 April and the digital TV channel BBC Four on 10 April 2002. The television version was an amended and abridged 90-minute version of the script, omitting all of the material involving the Junta and the Pope. The TV transmission was preceded by a half-hour programme on the controversy surrounding the original production, and was followed by a studio debate on the issues raised by both the cancellation and the play itself.

Hutchinson Paperback (1987 first edition).

== Media information ==
=== Script book ===
- Curteis, Ian (1 February 1998). The Falklands Play: A Television Play. Hutchinson. ISBN 978-0-09-170611-1.

=== DVD release ===
- Released on Region 2 DVD by BBC Video on 26 March 2007.
- The series was included in The Falklands 25th Commemorative Box Set with Tumbledown.

== See also ==
- Tumbledown
- An Ungentlemanly Act
- Cultural impact of the Falklands War
