= Wallace & Gromit: The Curse of the Were-Rabbit (soundtrack) =

2005 film soundtrack album

Wallace & Gromit: The Curse of the Were-Rabbit (Original Motion Picture Soundtrack)

Film score by Julian Nott
- Released: 11 October 2005
- Venue: London
- Studios: AIR Studios; Abbey Road Studios
- Genre: Film score
- Length: 48:11
- Label: Varèse Sarabande
- Producers: Hans Zimmer; Mark Wherry

Julian Nott chronology
Gifted (2003)	Wallace & Gromit: The Curse of the Were-Rabbit (2005)	Shoot the Messenger (2006)

Wallace & Gromit: The Curse of the Were-Rabbit (Original Motion Picture Soundtrack) is the soundtrack album scored by Wallace & Gromit series composer Julian Nott for the film of the same name and released by Varèse Sarabande on 11 October 2005. The soundtrack won the Annie Award for "Outstanding Achievement for Music in a Feature Production".

== Background and production ==
Julian Nott served as the film's composer for Wallace & Gromit: The Curse of the Were-Rabbit, having previously worked with Park on the three short films. Nott considered the score as the "biggest, most colourful score" blending traditional themes with gothic elements, along with choirs and pipe organs to provide horror elements.

The original theme for the film was a last minute improvisation for eleven hours. He wrote the theme hours before the recording and composed it within a single session. Since Wallace often lacks control over chaotic situations, he didn't have a specific theme while other characters had distinct themes. Especially for Feathers McGraw, one of the antagonists, had simple musical motifs to suggest underlying cunningness and menace using a Bernard Herrmann-style chord.

Julian Nott steered away from utilizing traditional animated music that mimics every action and treated those characters as real people in high stake scenarios often seen in live action films, though he utilizes comedic music in every slapstick situations. He took inspirations from Sergei Rachmaninoff's Piano Concerto No. 2 for the romantic moments, traditional British heroic styles reminiscent of Edward Elgar and William Walton to depict Gromit as a hero, and Thunderbirds as another inspiration for the gadget-heavy sequences.

Hans Zimmer served as the score producer, whose musical team from Remote Control Productions associated with the production; this included Rupert Gregson-Williams, James Dooley, Lorne Balfe and Alastair King writing additional music and expanding Julian Nott's themes to create a more cinematic and orchestral sound.

== Reception ==
Christian Clemmensen of Filmtracks wrote "On the whole, however, this score is seemingly targeting the crowd of listeners that defend Chicken Run to the death, and to their pleasure, they will find Wallace and Gromit: The Curse of the Were-Rabbit to be a generally superior and more consistent effort." Ian Lace of Music Web International described the soundtrack to be "ripping, racy and hillarious" and "never a dull moment". AllMusic wrote "Appropriately for the first full-length Wallace and Gromit feature film, the soundtrack is a sumptuous affair, all traditional British orchestral pomp and circumstance, with the accent on brash brass sounds for the action featuring our cheese-addicted hero Wallace and his faithful dogsbody, Gromit, and sylvan strings to herald the object of his affections, the delectable Lady Tottington."

== Track listing ==
No.	Title	Writer(s)	Length
1.	"A Grand Day Out"	Nott; Dooley	1:54
2.	"Anti-Pesto to the Rescue"	Nott; Gregson-Williams; Dooley	3:18
3.	"Bless You, Anti-Pesto!"	Nott; Dooley	1:56
4.	"Lady Tottington & Victor"	Nott; Gregson-Williams; Dooley; Balfe; King	2:03
5.	"Fire Up the Bun-Vac 6000"	Nott; Gregson-Williams	1:47
6.	"Your Ladyship"	Nott; Gregson-Williams; Dooley; Balfe	1:07
7.	"Brainwash & Go"	Nott; Gregson-Williams	2:28
8.	"Harvest Offering"	Nott; Gregson-Williams; Balfe	2:30
9.	"Arson Around"	Nott; Dooley; King	2:23
10.	"A Big Trap"	Nott; Gregson-Williams; Balfe	3:27
11.	"The Morning After"	Nott; Dooley	1:44
12.	"Transformation"	Nott; Balfe	4:05
13.	"Ravaged in the Night"	Nott; Gregson-Williams; King	1:45
14.	"Fluffy Lover Boy"	Nott; Gregson-Williams; Dooley	4:36
15.	"Kiss My Artichoke"	Nott; Gregson-Williams; Dooley	4:31
16.	"Dogfight"	Nott; Balfe	3:39
17.	"Every Dog Has His Day"	Nott; Dooley	2:43
18.	"All Things Fluffy"	Nott; Gregson-Williams	1:07
19.	"Wallace & Gromit"	Nott	1:08
Total length:			48:11

== Personnel ==
Credits adapted from liner notes:

- Music composers – Alastair King, James Michael Dooley, Julian Nott, Lorne Balfe, Rupert Gregson-Williams
- Music producer – Hans Zimmer, Mark Wherry
- Orchestrator – Nic Raine
- Orchestra conductor – Gavin Greenaway
- Orchestra contractor – Isobel Griffiths Ltd.
- Orchestra leader – Gavyn Wright
- Choirmaster – Jenny O'Grady
- Technical engineer – Mark Wherry
- Assistant engineer – Chris Barratt, Ian Wood, Jake Jackson, Nick Cervonaro, Richard Lancaster
- Recording – Geoff Foster, Peter Cobbin, Rupert Coulson, Simon Rhodes
- Mixing – Geoff Foster
- Mastering – Bruce Maddocks
- Music editor – Michael Connell, Simon Changer
- Executive producer – Robert Townson
- Music coordinator – Julie Imboden Keel*, Ken "Kaz" Smith*
- Production coordinator – Becky Bentham
- Music preparation – Tony Stanton, David Walter, Richard Robson, Roland Heap
- Package design – Matthew Joseph Peak
- Technician – Tristan Lillingston
- Technical assistance – Abhay Manusmare, Tom Broderick
- Executive music assistance – Andrew Zack
- Music clearance – Jo Miller, Julie Butchko
- Executive in charge of music – Sunny Park
- Music business affairs – Gareth Overton-Edwards, Jennifer Schiller, Lenny Wohl

== Chart performance ==
Chart performance for Wallace & Gromit: The Curse of the Were-Rabbit
Chart (2005–2026)	Peak position
UK Soundtrack Albums (Official Charts)	9

== Accolades ==
Group	Award	Recipients	Result
33rd Annie Awards	Best Music in an Animated Feature Production	Julian Nott	Won
