= Hugo Swire =

British politician (born 1959)

The Right Honourable The Lord Swire KCMG PC
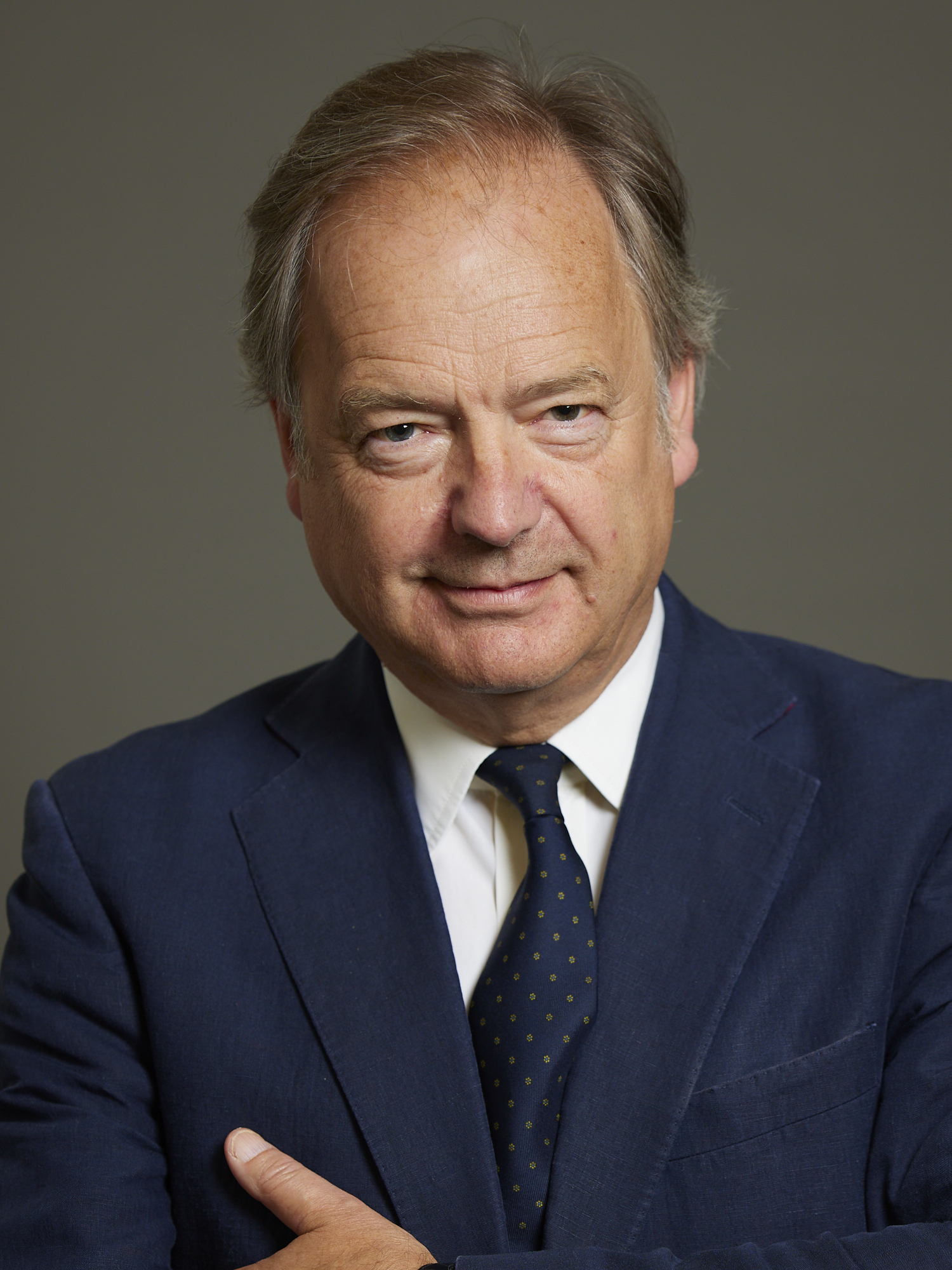
- Official portrait, 2023

Minister of State for Europe and the Americas
- In office 4 September 2012 – 15 July 2016
- Prime Minister: David Cameron
- Preceded by: Jeremy Browne
- Succeeded by: Alan Duncan

Minister of State for Northern Ireland
- In office 12 May 2010 – 4 September 2012
- Prime Minister: David Cameron
- Preceded by: Paul Goggins
- Succeeded by: Mike Penning

Member of the House of Lords
- Lord Temporal
- Life peerage 1 November 2022

Member of Parliament for East Devon
- In office 7 June 2001 – 6 November 2019
- Preceded by: Peter Emery
- Succeeded by: Simon Jupp

Shadow portfolios
- 2005–2007: Shadow Minister for the Olympics
- 2005–2007: Shadow Secretary of State for Culture, Media and Sport

Personal details
- Born: 30 November 1959 (age 66) Marylebone, London, England
- Party: Conservative
- Spouse: Sasha Nott (m. 1996)
- Children: 2
- Education: Eton College
- Alma mater: University of St Andrews; Royal Military Academy Sandhurst
- Website: Official website

Military service
- Allegiance: United Kingdom
- Branch/service: British Army
- Years of service: 1980–1983
- Rank: Lieutenant
- Unit: Grenadier Guards

Hugo George William Swire, Baron Swire, KCMG, PC (born 30 November 1959) is a British politician. He served as the Member of Parliament (MP) for East Devon from 2001 until 2019. A member of the Conservative Party, he has had several ministerial roles, most recently as Minister of State for Europe and the Americas, a role he held until July 2016. Swire is currently the Deputy Chairman of the Commonwealth Enterprise and Investment Council. He retired from the House of Commons at the 2019 general election. Since 2022 he has been a member of the House of Lords.

== Early life and education ==
Swire was born on 30 November 1959. His great-great-great-grandfather, John Swire (b. 1793), was the founder of the Liverpool textile trading business that later became the Swire Group, the multi-billion USD conglomerate based in Hong Kong. He is son of Humphrey Roger Swire (1934–2004), and Philippa Sophia Swire (born 1935), daughter of George Jardine Kidston-Montgomerie of Southannan. His mother remarried in 2004 George Townshend, 7th Marquess Townshend.

He is the brother of Sophia Swire.

Swire was privately educated at St. Aubyns School, a preparatory school in Rottingdean, East Sussex, and at Eton College. He studied at the University of St Andrews for a year before attending the Royal Military Academy Sandhurst.

== Career ==
Swire served in the Grenadier Guards for three years, between 1980 and 1983, before working as a financial consultant. He became the first Head of Development for the National Gallery in 1988, before working at the auction house Sotheby's from 1992, where he became a Director in 1996. He held this role when standing for election in 2001.

Swire was non-executive chairman of Photo-Me International prior to joining the Government.

== Member of Parliament ==
He contested Greenock and Inverclyde in 1997, finishing fourth. In 2001 he won the seat of East Devon. Two years after his election to Parliament, Swire became an Opposition whip. In 2004, he was promoted to become Shadow Culture Minister. He joined the Shadow Cabinet on 8 December 2005, when new leader David Cameron appointed him Shadow Secretary of State for Culture, Media and Sport.

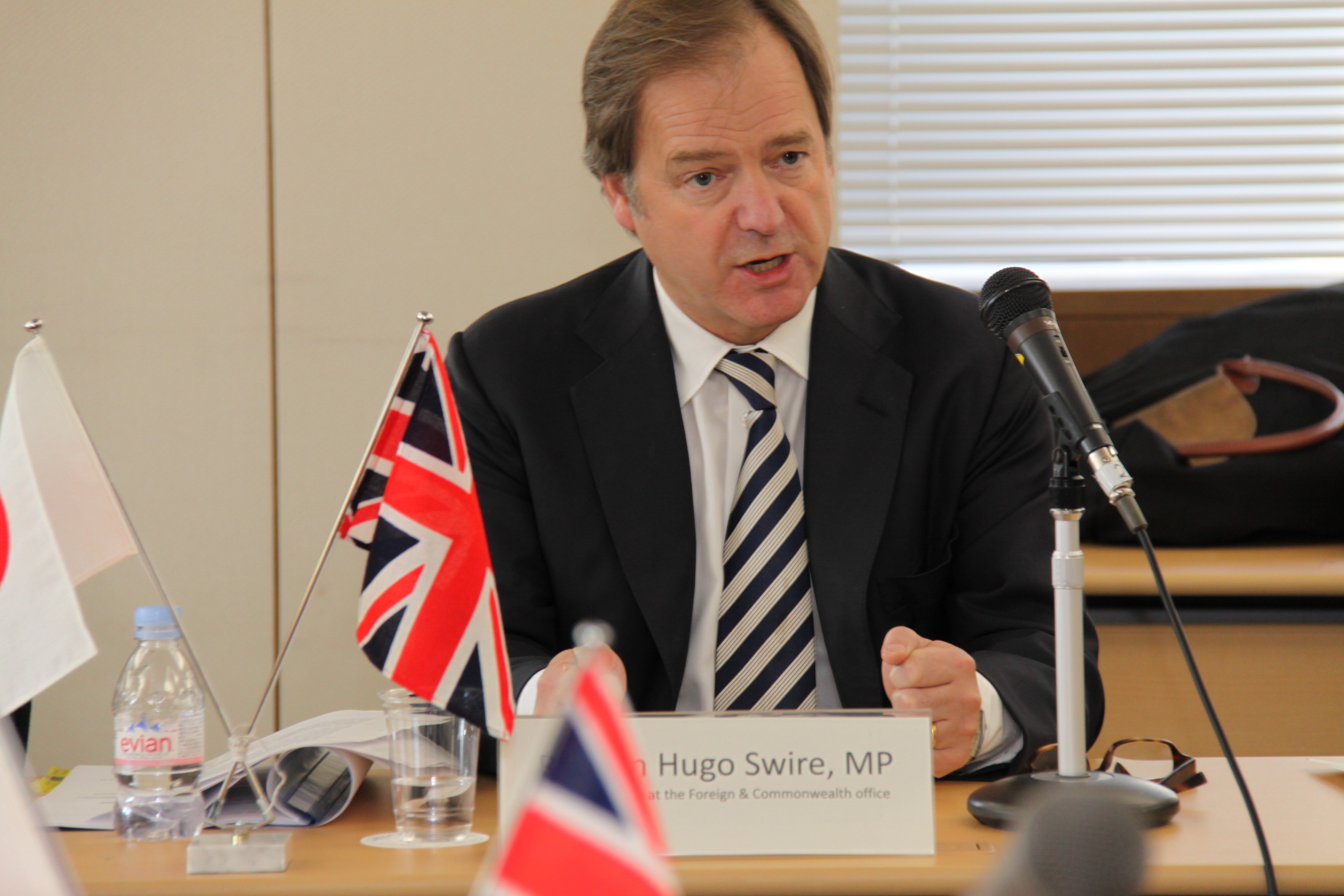
Swire opens the 12th UK-Japan Politico-Military Talks in 2013.

Swire was sacked in the July 2007 Conservative frontbench reshuffle for suggesting his party would scrap free museum entry. He returned to the backbenches, and amongst other roles became Hon. Secretary of the Conservative Middle East Council.

=== Minister of State for Northern Ireland ===
In May 2010 he was appointed Minister of State for Northern Ireland in the newly elected Conservative-Liberal Democrat coalition government headed by Prime Minister David Cameron.

=== Minister of State for Europe and the Americas ===
Swire was made Minister of State for Europe and the Americas on 4 September 2012. On 6 September 2013, he sent letters to the South China Morning Post and Ming Pao, commenting on the universal suffrage of Hong Kong SAR, emphasising the importance of democracy. Moreover, he added that he would provide any support towards the establishment of universal suffrage in Hong Kong.

In January 2015, Hong Kong's leaders caused diplomatic outrage after declining to meet him to discuss political reform. Swire believed the Chinese government feared it would cause pro-democracy unrest, though the purpose of the visit was also to support trade. He resigned from his ministerial post on 15 July 2016, following the sacking of several other ministers who were considered to be close to David Cameron. He had tweeted: "Not a good time to be a Cameroon. The tumbrils are rolling again!"

Swire was made a Knight Commander of the Order of St Michael and St George in the 2016 Prime Minister's Resignation Honours.

=== Conservative Middle East Council ===
Swire became Chairman of the Conservative Middle East Council (CMEC) in September 2016, having previously been a member of the group. In June 2016, he accepted a donation of £10,000 from the wife of a billionaire with links to the leadership of Saudi Arabia. The journalist Peter Oborne has criticised the direction of CMEC away from its earlier focus on Palestine, to greater interest on the Gulf States, including Saudi Arabia.

=== Expenses ===
Various aspects of Swire's parliamentary expenses have generated adverse comments from critics. He was criticised for having the joint highest Additional Cost Allowance in the country in 2002/03, but argued that it was legal and that he had not financially benefited from the arrangement as he only rented the property in his constituency that the bulk of the costs related to. He was featured in articles on questionable expenses claims in The Telegraph, The Guardian and the BBC website in 2009, with attention made to his claims for a designer laptop case, an opera booklet and a satellite navigation system. Swire argued that the claims were sound and that he had not been asked to pay any of them back.

Although Parliament banned new MPs from employing family members from June 2017, Swire continued to employ his wife as his Senior Researcher/Parliamentary Assistant until his retirement. He stated in 2009 that family members could add value and that his wife has an 'extraordinary knowledge of the constituency having worked for me'.

=== Other ===
Swire correctly predicted in November 2016 that Donald Trump would win the election for President of the United States of America.

Although a eurosceptic, Swire supported the official position of his party and campaigned for the United Kingdom to remain in the European Union before the EU membership referendum on 23 June 2016. After the result was announced, Swire continued to support the party leadership and advocated leaving the European Union.

== House of Lords ==
It was announced on 14 October 2022, that as part of the 2022 Special Honours, Swire would be appointed a life peer. On 1 November 2022, he was created Baron Swire, of Down St Mary in the County of Devon.

== Personal life ==
Swire married Alexandra (Sasha) Nott, the daughter of Sir John Nott (former Conservative Secretary of State for Defence, whose tenure included the Falklands War) in December 1996 in Kensington. The couple have two daughters (born May 1997 and August 2001). Julian Nott is one of Swire's brothers-in-law. Swire is distantly related to Australian musician Rob Swire.

Parliament of the United Kingdom
Preceded by Peter Emery	Member of Parliament for East Devon; 2001–2019	Succeeded by Simon Jupp
Political offices
Preceded by Theresa May	Shadow Secretary of State for Culture, Media and Sport; 2005–2007	Succeeded by Jeremy Hunt
New office	Shadow Minister for the Olympics; 2005–2007	Succeeded by Jeremy Hunt
Preceded by Jeremy Browne	Minister of State for Europe and the Americas; 2012–2016	Succeeded by Alan Duncan
Orders of precedence in the United Kingdom
Preceded by The Lord Roberts of Belgravia	Gentlemen; Baron Swire	Followed by The Lord Verdirame
