= John Nott =

British politician (1932–2024)

The Right Honourable Sir John Nott KCB
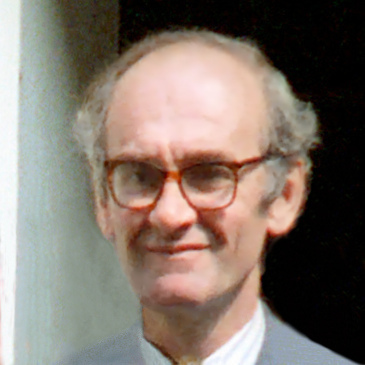
- Nott in 1982

Secretary of State for Defence
- In office 5 January 1981 – 6 January 1983
- Prime Minister: Margaret Thatcher
- Preceded by: Francis Pym
- Succeeded by: Michael Heseltine

Secretary of State for Trade; President of the Board of Trade
- In office 4 May 1979 – 5 January 1981
- Prime Minister: Margaret Thatcher
- Preceded by: John Smith
- Succeeded by: John Biffen

Member of Parliament for St Ives
- In office 31 March 1966 – 13 May 1983
- Preceded by: Greville Howard
- Succeeded by: David Harris

Personal details
- Born: John William Frederic Nott; 1 February 1932 Bromley, Kent, England
- Died: 6 November 2024 (aged 92)
- Party: Conservative (1968-2016)
- Other political affiliations: National Liberal Party (1966–1968)
- Spouse: Miloska Sekol (m. 1959)
- Children: 3, including Julian and Sasha
- Education: Bradfield College
- Alma mater: Trinity College, Cambridge

Military service
- Branch: British Army
- Service years: 1952–1956
- Rank: Lieutenant
- Unit: 2nd Gurkha Rifles

Sir John William Frederic Nott (1 February 1932 – 6 November 2024) was a British politician who served as Secretary of State for Defence from 1981 to 1983 (during the Falklands War). A member of the National Liberal (until 1968) and Conservative parties, Nott served as Member of Parliament (MP) for St Ives from 1966 to 1983.

== Early life ==
Nott was born in Bromley, south-east London (part of Kent until 1965), to Richard Nott, a rice broker from a military family, and Phyllis Francis, and was educated at Bradfield College.

In 1952 he was commissioned as a regular officer in the 2nd Gurkha Rifles, serving in the Malayan Emergency after a period of service with the Royal Scots. In 1956 he left the army to study law and economics at Trinity College, Cambridge, where he was president of the Cambridge Union Society. He was called to the bar at the Inner Temple in 1959.

== Career ==
=== Early parliamentary career ===
In 1966 Nott was elected as a National Liberal and Conservative MP for the Cornwall constituency of St Ives, the last person elected under the National Liberal label. The party was formally absorbed into the Conservatives in 1968, after which Nott sat as a Conservative MP. He was the last surviving former National Liberal MP.

In 1968 he was one of the few MPs to vote against the Commonwealth Immigrants Act 1968, thinking it "disgraceful that people who had British passports should have them taken away".

=== Ministerial career ===
Nott served in the government of Edward Heath as Minister of State at the Treasury. After a brief spell working as a City of London consultant and focusing on managing his Cornish estate, where he grew flowers commercially, he joined the Shadow Cabinet in 1976. He was made Secretary of State for Trade after Margaret Thatcher won the 1979 general election and became a privy councillor. The Department of Trade was responsible for shipping and aviation and the privatisation of British Airways, the first privatisation of the Thatcher government. Overseeing the Department of Prices and Consumer Protection, Nott was also responsible for repealing the prices and incomes policy and played a leading role in the abolition of exchange control.

In the January 1981 reshuffle, Nott became Secretary of State for Defence. Short-term commitment to cost savings meant that defence decisions were made based on affordability at the expense of naval husbandry since prior to the Argentine invasion of the Falklands in 1982, the government had been unwilling to consider such a strategic risk. Time was of the essence and, by prioritising reduced public spending, the government acknowledged the more immediate risk of national bankruptcy against the less pressing strategic analysis of another war. Nott was widely criticised by Royal Navy chiefs over the 1981 Defence White Paper for his decision to cut back on forward government naval expenditure during the severe economic recession of the early 1980s; the reductions originally included the proposed scrapping of the Antarctic patrol ship HMS Endurance and the reduction of the surface fleet to 50 frigates and from three to two aircraft carriers. He switched the resultant savings to nuclear submarines, naval weapon systems and air defence. He famously walked out of an interview with Robin Day during the 1982 Conservative Party conference after Day referred to him as a "here today, gone tomorrow politician", although he retained a sense of humour about the incident, later naming his memoir Here Today, Gone Tomorrow.

In his white paper Command 8758 "The Falkland Campaign: The Lessons", Nott announced a major rebuilding programme costing around £1 billion to replace all the ships, Harrier aircraft and helicopters lost during the Falklands War, including the building of five new Type 22 frigates. He also closed Chatham Dockyard and ended the mid-life modernisation of old frigates. He took through Parliament the upgrading of the nuclear deterrent to the current Trident system (D5).

=== Resignation ===
Nott offered his resignation to Thatcher following the Argentine invasion of the Falklands in 1982. Unlike the Foreign Secretary, Lord Carrington, however, his resignation was not accepted. Nott remained as defence secretary throughout the four-month conflict. He was eventually replaced in January 1983 by Michael Heseltine after he decided not to seek re-election at the 1983 general election. On retirement he was appointed a knight commander of the Order of the Bath (KCB).

=== Business career ===
From 1985 to 1989 Nott was chairman and chief executive of Lazard Brothers. This coincided with the cabinet crisis on the future of Westland Helicopters, which rocked the Thatcher government. Lazard Brothers acted for Westland against Michael Heseltine's proposal for a European consortium. Among the other well-publicised events that occurred while Nott was at Lazard was the takeover of Guinness. He also served as chairman of Hillsdown Holdings, a multinational food company, and of the Canadian firm Maple Leaf Foods, and was deputy chairman of Royal Insurance. In addition, he was an adviser to APAX Partners and Freshfields.

=== Books ===
Nott published his autobiography, Here Today, Gone Tomorrow, in 2002. Other works include: Mr Wonderful Takes a Cruise (2004), Haven't We Been Here Before (2007), Mr Wonderful Seeks Immortality (2014) and Memorable Encounters (2018).

== Personal life ==
In 1959 Nott married Miloska Sekol, whom he met at the University of Cambridge. They had two sons (including the film composer Julian Nott) and a daughter, Sasha (wife of Hugo, Baron Swire).

He was a supporter of Brexit. In 2016 he had criticised the "poisoned EU debate" in the Conservative Party and suspended his party membership until there was a change of leadership.

Nott spent much of his retirement restoring his 200-acre (81 ha) farm in Cornwall. He died on 6 November 2024, at the age of 92.

At the time of his death, he, John Major and Malcolm Rifkind were the only surviving members of the Thatcher cabinet not sitting in either house of Parliament.

== In popular culture ==
Nott was interviewed about the rise of Thatcherism for the 2006 BBC TV documentary series Tory! Tory! Tory!

He was portrayed by Clive Merrison in the 2002 BBC production of Ian Curteis's controversial The Falklands Play, and by Angus Wright in the film The Iron Lady.

== Published works ==
- — (2002). Here Today, Gone Tomorrow: Recollections of an Errant Politician. Politico's. ISBN 978-1-84275-030-8.
- — (2004). Mr Wonderful Takes a Cruise: The Adventures of an Old Age Pensioner. London: Ebury. ISBN 978-0-09-189834-2.
- — (2007). Haven't We Been Here Before. Discovered Authors. ISBN 978-1-905108-49-7.
- — (2014). Mr Wonderful Seeks Immortality. SilverWood Books. ISBN 978-1-78132-198-0.
- — (2018). Memorable Encounters. Pen & Sword Politics. ISBN 978-1-5267-5115-7.

== See also ==
- "Rejoice", a 1982 remark made by Margaret Thatcher following a statement read by Nott

Parliament of the United Kingdom
Preceded by Greville Howard	Member of Parliament for St Ives; 1966–1983	Succeeded by David Harris
Political offices
Preceded by John Smith	Secretary of State for Trade; 1979–1981	Succeeded by John Biffen
Preceded by Francis Pym	Secretary of State for Defence; 1981–1983	Succeeded by Michael Heseltine
