= Miloska Nott =

British-Slovenian fundraiser (born 1935)

Miloška Nott, Lady Nott
- Born: Miloška Sekol-Vlahović; 1935 (age 89–90); Maribor, Slovenia
- Occupation: Charity fundraiser
- Known for: Humanitarian aid
- Notable work: Set up Fund For Refugees in Slovenia
- Spouse: John Nott (m. 1959; died 2024)
- Children: 3 (including Julian and Sasha)
- Father: Lujo Vlahović

Miloška Nott, Lady Nott, OBE (née Sekol-Vlahović; born 1935), is a British-Slovenian charity fundraiser.

== Biography ==
Born as an illegitimate daughter out of a short liaison between Ludvik (nicknamed Lujo) Vlahović, a wealthy inn-keeper in Maribor, of Croatian descent, and Ljudmila Rosato, née Sekol, his waitress and lover of Slovenian origin. Coming from different social circles, Vlahović being the son of a newly prospered bourgeois inn-keeper in Maribor, and Ljudmila being the illegitimate daughter of modest parents, their short relationship would have not been welcomed by the Vlahović family. They went their separate ways, married other people, Ljudmila moved to Como, Italy, and put their daughter into foster care for a few years. Miloška, christened Ljudmila same as her mother, grew up in Maribor with the Vlahović family. Her father was interned in the Dachau concentration camp for helping anti-Nazi Slovene Partisans during the Second World War. Once a teenager she moved to Italy and subsequently to the United Kingdom, for studies, and settled there.

During the Bosnian War she set up The Fund For Refugees in Slovenia, which organises humanitarian aid, schooling and homes for people who were forced to flee the war.

She was awarded an OBE in the Queen's birthday honours in 2012 for her humanitarian work.

== Personal life ==
In 1959 she married John Nott (1932−2024), later Secretary of State for Defence, whom she met at the University of Cambridge. They had two sons (including the film composer Julian Nott) and a daughter, Sasha.

After her husband was made a Knight Commander of the Order of the Bath in 1983, she became known as Lady Nott.
