= An Ungentlemanly Act =

1992 British television film by Stuart Urban

- Odyssey Video DVD Cover
- Genre: Historical drama
- Written by: Stuart Urban
- Directed by: Stuart Urban
- Starring: Ian Richardson; Bob Peck; Rosemary Leach; Ian McNeice
- Theme music composer: Russell King
- Country of origin: United Kingdom
- Original language: English

Production
- Producers: Bradley Adams; Franc Roddam; Michael Wearing
- Cinematography: Peter Chapman
- Running time: 135 minutes

Original release
- Network: BBC2
- Release: 13 June 1992

An Ungentlemanly Act is a 1992 BBC television film about the first days of the invasion of the Falkland Islands in 1982.

== Production ==
The film was written and directed by Stuart Urban. It was commissioned to mark the tenth anniversary of the Falklands War. The film was closely based on the historical record, and all of the major incidents portrayed were drawn from contemporary accounts by those who took part. Filming took place on the Falkland Islands and at Ealing Studios. Urban is a fluent Spanish-speaker, and plays an uncredited role as an Argentine radio operator.

Ian Richardson replaced Ian Holm as Falklands Governor Rex Hunt after Holm dropped out of the production at the last minute. Bob Peck plays Major Mike Norman, the commander of the Royal Marines based at Stanley, while Norman himself acted as advisor on the production, and has a small part as a member of the Falkland Islands Defence Force (FIDF). Don Bonner, who was Governor Hunt's chauffeur at the time of the conflict, cameos in a scene set in Stanley store where he says "Hello Don" to the actor playing him.

== Reception ==
The film was well-received on release and is generally considered to be an accurate and even-handed portrayal of events. It won the BAFTA Award for Best Single Drama the following year, and was later shown on television in Argentina.

=== Awards ===
- BAFTA Awards 1993
  - Won: BAFTA TV Award for Best Single Drama: Bradley Adams & Stuart Urban
  - Nominated: BAFTA TV Award for Best Actor: Ian Richardson
- Royal Television Society 1993
  - Nominated: RTS Television Award for Best Actor (Male): Ian Richardson

== Cast ==
- Ian Richardson .... Governor Rex Hunt
- Bob Peck .... Maj. Mike Norman
- Rosemary Leach .... Mavis Hunt
- Ian McNeice .... Dick Baker
- James Warrior .... Don Bonner
- Marc Warren .... Tony Hunt
- Elizabeth Bradley .... Nanny
- Kate Spiro .... Connie Baker
- Holly Barker .... Baker Girl #1
- Claire Slater .... Baker Girl #2
- Hugh Ross .... Maj. Garry Noott
- Ian Embleton .... Cpl. 'Geordie' Gill
- Aidan Gillen .... Marine Wilcox
- Richard Graham .... Cpl Lou Armour
- Matthew Ashforde .... Marine Farnworth
- Richard Long ... Marine Dorey
- Garry Cooper ... Colour Sgt. Muir
- Phil Atkinson ... Sgt. Short
- Christopher Northey ... Maj. Phil Summers (FIDF)
- Chris Walker ... 'Ex-Marine' Jim Fairfield (as Christopher Walker)
- Mike Norman ... F.I.D.F. Stalwart
- Christopher Jaffray ... F.I.D.F. Youth 1
- Simon Godwin ... F.I.D.F. Youth 2
- Jonathan Cohen ... Marine #1
- Lee Alliston ... Marine #2
- Alex Norton ... Chief of Police Ronnie Lamb
- Gary Clement ... Butcher
- Harry Jones ... Henry Halliday
- Trevor Cooper ... Des King
- Morag Siller ... Alison King
- Flip Webster ... Mrs King
- Mike Grady ... Patrick Watts (FIBS DJ)
- Tom Hodgkins ... Tom Olsen
- Anne Reid ... Mrs. Mozeley
- Simon Fisher-Becker ... Prisoner
- Adam Godley ... P.C. Anton Livermore
- Janet Robertson ... Sonia
- Helen Blades ... Sonia's Friend
- Antonio Valero ... Vice-Commodore Hector Gilobert
- Fulgencio Saturno ... Vice-Adm. Carlos Büsser
- Alan Turner ... Maj. Patricio Dowling
- Arturo Venegas ... Capt. Pedro Giachino
- Ricardo Vélez ... Lt. Lugo
- Vincent S. Boluda ... Lt. Quiroga
- Robert Reina ... Medic Ernesto Urbina
- Juan Martinez ... Marine
- Paul Geoffrey ... Simon Winchester
- Stuart Urban ... Argentinian 'snatch squad' radio operator (uncredited)
- Crew of British yacht Creighton's Naturally ... Argentine Marines (uncredited)

== See also ==
- Cultural impact of the Falklands War
- The Falklands Play
- Tumbledown
