= Public holidays in the Falkland Islands =

Public holidays in the Falkland Islands are determined by the Executive Council of the Falkland Islands. There are currently nine annual public holidays in force in the Falklands, with several other observances throughout the year. When a public holiday falls on a Saturday or Sunday, the holiday is carried over to the following Monday.

== Public holidays ==
| Date | Holiday | Notes |
|---|---|---|
| 1 January | New Year's Day | |
| Variable | Good Friday | Commemorates the Crucifixion of Jesus Christ. |
| 14 June | Liberation Day | The anniversary of the liberation of the Falkland Islanders from Argentine military occupation at the end of the Falklands War in 1982. |
| First Monday in October | Peat Cutting Day | Public holiday since 2002. |
| 14 November | King's Birthday | Observed on the day of King Charles III birth rather than his official birthday. The holiday was previously held on 21 April during the reign of Queen Elizabeth II. |
| 8 December | Battle Day | The anniversary of the Battle of the Falkland Islands in 1914. |
| 25 December | Christmas Day | Commemorates the birth of Jesus Christ. |
| 26 December | Boxing Day | |
| 27 December | Christmas Holiday | Additional public holiday after Christmas Day and Boxing Day. |
| 30 December | Government Holiday | Not public holidays, but days on which all Government Departments (other than those providing essential services) are closed. Should these days fall on the weekend, they are moved to the previous Thursday/Friday. |
| 31 December | Government Holiday | Not public holidays, but days on which all Government Departments (other than those providing essential services) are closed. Should these days fall on the weekend, they are moved to the previous Thursday/Friday. |

== One-off public holidays ==
A one-off public holiday was declared for 19 September 2022, the day of Queen Elizabeth II's funeral.
