= Sasha Swire =

English author and journalist

The Right Honourable The Lady Swire
- Born: Alexandra Patrusha Mina Nott; 18 January 1963 (age 63); London, England
- Education: Cranborne Chase School
- Alma mater: St Martin's School of Art
- Occupations: Author, journalist
- Spouse: Hugo Swire (m. 1996)
- Children: 2
- Parents: John Nott (father); Miloska Sekol Vlahovič (mother)
- Relatives: Julian Nott (brother)

Alexandra Patrusha Mina Swire, Baroness Swire (née Nott; born 18 January 1963), commonly known as Sasha Swire, is an English author and journalist, and the wife of the former Conservative Party Minister of State Hugo Swire, Baron Swire.

She is the author of the 2020 book Diary of an MP's Wife.

== Early Life and Career ==
Descended from Devon gentry, Alexandra Nott is the only daughter of Sir John Nott, former Member of Parliament for St Ives and Secretary of State for Defence under Margaret Thatcher during the Falklands War, and his wife Miloska Vlahovič, daughter of Yugoslav resistance leader Lujo Vlahovič, of Slovenian extraction.

Her elder and younger brothers, Julian and William Nott, both attended Eton College, while she was educated at Cranborne Chase School. She then pursued further studies at St Martin's School of Art, where she was a contemporary of the fashion designer John Galliano.

Swire trained as a journalist and has a background in local journalism.

She sought selection for the Teignbridge parliamentary candidacy of 2005 won by Stanley Johnson. David Cameron wanted her to stand for a parliamentary seat for the Conservative Party again in 2009.

She voted Remain in the 2016 EU referendum. She followed up the publication of Diary of an MP's Wife with a book about walking the South West Coast Path. Edgeland: A Slow Walk West, was published in 2023.

== Diaries ==
Swire's book, Diary of an MP's Wife: Inside and Outside Power, was published on 24 September 2020. They are a condensed version of diaries kept between 2010 and 2019, and contains insights into the private lives of Conservative politicians, including David Cameron, George Osborne, Dominic Raab, Theresa May, Michael Gove and Boris Johnson. It was serialised in The Times prior to its release.

Petronella Wyatt, a friend, reported that Swire was initially distressed by some of the sensational extracts, hinting that they had somehow been "distorted". According to her book, Cameron once ventured to say to Swire: "The scent you are wearing is affecting my pheromones. It makes me want to grab you and push you into the bushes and give you one."

The book was criticised by Karen Pollock, chief executive of the Holocaust Educational Trust, for its "casual, blasé use" of the term "Jewish lobby". The Jewish Chronicle opined that Swire had written "antisemitic-sounding comments" in relation to the term.

Reflecting in 2021 on the publication of her diaries, Swire wrote, "I was totally unprepared for the headlines that followed. It felt at times as if my wings were made of wax and feathers, that the sun had melted them and there was no shortage of hands pressing down on my head to keep me from resurfacing from a deep ocean. To be confronted with such a distorted picture of my real self was challenging to say the least."

== Personal life ==
She married Hugo Swire on 12 December 1996 at the chapel of the Royal Hospital Chelsea, where Lord Michael Cecil was best man. She was her husband's parliamentary assistant for 18 years until he stood down from the House of Commons.

The couple live in London SW6 and have two daughters, born in 1997 and 2001.

== Honours ==
- Cross of Merit, Order pro Merito Melitensi

== Bibliography ==
- Diary of an MP's Wife: Inside and Outside Power (Little, Brown Book Group, 2020) ISBN 9781408713419
- Edgeland: A Slow Walk West, (Abacus, 2023) ISBN 978-1408717158

== See also ==
- Burke's Landed Gentry
