= Tumbledown =

1988 British television film

- BBC DVD Cover
- Genre: Drama
- Written by: Charles Wood
- Directed by: Richard Eyre
- Starring: Colin Firth; Paul Rhys; David Calder
- Composer: Richard Hartley
- Country of origin: United Kingdom
- Original language: English

Production
- Producer: Richard Broke
- Cinematography: Andrew Dunn
- Editor: Ken Pearce
- Running time: 113 minutes

Original release
- Network: BBC1
- Release: 31 May 1988

Related
- An Ungentlemanly Act; The Falklands Play

Tumbledown is a 1988 BBC Television drama film set during the Falklands War. Directed by Richard Eyre, it stars Colin Firth, Paul Rhys, and David Calder.

== Synopsis ==
The film centres on the experiences of Lieutenant Robert Lawrence MC (played by Colin Firth), an officer of the Scots Guards during the Falklands War of 1982. While fighting at the Battle of Mount Tumbledown, Lawrence is shot in the head by an Argentine sniper, and left paralysed on his left side. He then must learn to adjust to his new disability.

== Cast ==
- Colin Firth as Robert Lawrence
- Paul Rhys as Hugh MacKessac
- David Calder as John Lawrence
- Barbara Leigh-Hunt as Jean Lawrence
- Emma Bowe as Sophie Martin-Wells (as Emma Harbour)
- Rupert Baker as Nick Lawrence
- Jack Fortune as Christopher Lawrence
- Roddy Maude-Roxby as George Stubbs
- Ann Bell as Helen Stubbs
- Sophie Thompson as Louise Stubbs
- Dan Hildebrand as Prothero
- Tam Dean Burn as Sergeant Brodick
- Mark Williams as Lumpy
- Ian Michie as Fraser
- Paul Higgins as Saltemarsh
- Stewart Porter as O'Rourke
- Timothy Carlton as Lt. Colonel Bill Kirke
- Mark Wing-Davey as Adjutant Stewart Inglis
- Robin Daglish as Major Peter Walsh
- Andrew McCulloch as Padre Major Alistair Tolly
- Edward Rawle-Hicks as Lt. Peter Fyshe
- Charles Millham as The Noble Lord
- Ben Cole as Harry Hebers
- Clive Russell as Terry Knapp
- James Griffiths as Surgeon
- David Conville as Brigade Officer
- Edwin Richfield as Group Captain
- Brian Hall as Squadron Leader Wentworth
- Pete Postlethwaite as Major – Rehabilitation Centre
- Charles Lamb as Elderly Man
- Richard Owens as RAF Officer
- Arbel Jones as Welsh Lady
- Sean Scanlan as Welsh Man
- Tony Caunter as Air Commodore
- Iain McColl as Colour Sergeant
- Edward Lyon as Lt. Colonel RAMC
- Victoria Hasted as Nurse Wendy
- Angela Morant as Major Newman
- Murray Ewan as CSM Brown
- Wendy Nottingham as Mrs Prothero
- Andrew Livingston as Young Doctor
- Maggie McCarthy as Nurse Mary
- Sharon D. Clarke as 1st Night Nurse (as Sharon Clarke)
- Leila Bertrand as 2nd Night Nurse
- Liza Tarbuck as Angie (as Lisa Tarbuck)
- Felicity Montagu as Tricia
- Roy Spencer as Hospital Chaplain
- Winston Crooke as Benny
- Steven Law as Cabby
- Alan White as Yeoman Warder
- George Irving as Tug
- Marian McLoughlin as Mandy
- Serena Gordon as Phyllida
- Francisco Morales as Argentinian Soldier
- Martin Garfield as Argentinian Soldier

== Awards ==
- BAFTA TV Awards 1989
  - Won: Best Film Cameraman: Andrew Dunn
  - Won: Best Make Up: Shaunna Harrison
  - Won: Best Single Drama: Richard Broke, Richard Eyre & Charles Wood
  - Nominated: Best Actor: Colin Firth
  - Nominated: Best Costume Design: Michael Burdle
  - Nominated: Best Design: Geoff Powell
  - Nominated: Best Film Editor: Ken Pearce
  - Nominated: Best Film Sound: Graham Ross, Ken Hams & Christopher Swanton
  - Nominated: Best Original Television Music: Richard Hartley
- RTS Television Award 1989
  - Won: Best Actor (Male): Colin Firth
  - Won: Best Make Up Design: Shaunna Harrison
  - Won: Best Single Play: Charles Wood
- Prix Italia 1988 Prix Italia, Winners 1949 - 2010, RAI

== Reception ==
The film sparked enormous controversy when first broadcast in 1988, in part because it conveyed the flat indifference shown by government, society and public to the returning wounded from the Falklands War; this content forms much of the story, as Lawrence struggles to come to terms with his terrible injuries, and to face a life in which he cannot do the thing he is trained to do, the thing he loves: soldiering.

The film also triggered controversy by presenting an unvarnished portrait of the protagonist: for example, his joy in the brutalities of war and a flashback scene toward the end which shows him exulting at the top of Mount Tumbledown. The film portrays Lawrence's love of the military life as much as it portrays his feelings of abandonment and bitterness as he tries to cope with his wounds, with little help from the government that sent him into battle.

Lead actor Colin Firth is reported to have said that the political left and right hated the film because it did not conform to any fixed ideology.

== Media information ==
Penguin Scriptbook (1988 reprint)

=== DVD release ===
- Released on Region 2 DVD by BBC Video on 2007-03-26.
- The series was included in The Falklands 25th Commemorative Box Set with The Falklands Play.

=== Script book ===
- Wood, Charles (25 June 1987). Tumbledown: A Screenplay. Penguin Books. ISBN 978-0-14-048215-7. Paperback edition (28 April 1988). Penguin Books. ISBN 978-0-14-011198-9

== See also ==
- The Falklands Play
- An Ungentlemanly Act
- Cultural impact of the Falklands War
