= Anna and the Moods =

- Directed by: Gunnar Karlsson
- Screenplay by: Sjón
- Story by: Sjón
- Produced by: Hilmar Sigurðsson; Arnar Thorisson
- Starring: Björk; Damon Albarn; Sjón
- Narrated by: Terry Jones
- Music by: Julian Nott
- Production company: CAOZ Studio
- Release dates: October 2006 (Reykjavík); 9 February 2007 (Iceland)
- Running time: 27 minutes
- Countries: Iceland; United Kingdom
- Languages: Icelandic; English

Anna and the Moods is a 2006 animated short film directed by Gunnar Karlsson. The plot centers on a girl named Anna Young (voiced by Björk) who contracts a horrible illness that makes her incredibly moody.

The film was written by Sjón on a commission by the Brodsky Quartet, which performs the music composed by Julian Nott in the film. It premiered at the 2006 Reykjavík International Film Festival, and was released in Iceland on 9 February 2007 in both Icelandic and English. Anna and the Moods won the Edda Award for Best Short Film.

== Plot ==
Anna Young has always been the perfect daughter. One day, Anna's attitude dramatically changes, leaving her parents worried. Unable to figure out what has happened to their daughter, Anna's parents take her to Dr. Artmann's clinic for unruly children. At the clinic Anna is exposed to a variety of obstacles in a complex labyrinth. The only way out of the maze for Anna is to complete the tasks in the right way. Anna, however, decides to create mischief to escape. This leads Dr. Artmann to come to a shocking conclusion about Anna, the cure of which is a nasty surprise for her parents.

== Cast ==
- Terry Jones, narrator
- Björk as Anna Young
- Damon Albarn as Mr. Young
- Thorunn Larusdottir as Mrs. Young
- Sjón as Dr. Artmann
- Jón Páll Eyjólfsson as Granny, Anna's Uncle, Hunter, Michael, MUM figure
- Hreidar Smárason as Little Brother
- Martin Regal as Normal Boy
- Ámundi Sigurdsson as Healthy Boy
- Einar Örn Benediktsson as Peter the Goth
- Stefán Karl Stefánsson, special ad lib and extras
