= Malvinas 2032 =

1999 video game

- Developer: Sabarasa Entertainment
- Engine: Custom-made
- Platform: Windows
- Release: 1999
- Genre: Real Time Strategy

Malvinas 2032 is a video game developed and published by Sabarasa Entertainment.

== Plot and gameplay ==
The player takes control of Argentinian forces and tries to take back the Malvinas Islands from Britain. It takes place in 2032, on the 50th anniversary of the Malvinas War.

== Development ==
Javier Otaegui serves as the project lead. In 1996 he read in the local newspaper that Conde Entertainment Software had just won an international prize for real-time strategy Regnum, the first Argentinian CD release which sold over 10,000 copies. Otaegui was inspired by this moment, later recalling that he thought "If someone has already made a game in Argentina, maybe I can do the same". The game took three years of development and led to Otaegui starting his own company, Sabarasa. He considered it a "tribute" to the combatants killed in the war.

The game's development began in March 1996, taking around 3.5 years to complete. During that time the team created their gaming engine and converted it from DOS to DirectX.

GarageDeveloper International published the game in English.

== Release ==
In March 2001, LeTemps announced the game was to be released in English in the next few weeks.

== Critical reception ==
Idnes gave it a scathing review. JDeJuegos argues it was the first and only attempt from the Argentinian video gaming industry to create an RTS.

== Legacy ==
Its legacy is in being one of the first Argentinian video games, alongside contemporary titles such as Yo, Matías, and Argentum Online.

== See also ==
- Cultural impact of the Falklands War
