= Flatworld =

- Opening titles
- Directed by: Daniel Greaves
- Written by: Daniel Greaves
- Produced by: Daniel Greaves; Nigel Pay; Patrick Veale
- Music by: Julian Nott
- Release date: 18 July 1997 (UK)
- Running time: 30 minutes
- Country: United Kingdom

Flatworld is a 1997 animated short directed by Daniel Greaves and produced by Nigel Pay and Patrick Veale. The film was created using a combination of cardboard cut-outs and traditional cel animation. It premiered on 18 July 1997 on the Locomotion channel, which broadcast the film alongside The Making of Flatworld, a documentary in which the personnel involved showed how the film was made through a series of interviews.

The film was nominated for a BAFTA Awards for "Film – Short Animation" and was the winner of more than thirty international awards, including the Mclaren Award for Best Animation.

== Summary ==
The film follows Matt Phlatt alongside his pet cat Geoff and pet fish Chips where a freak electrical accident causes the story to flip between two worlds: Flatworld, a city made of paper and cardboard where every character is "flat" in a 3D world, and Flipside, a universe animated like various cartoon formats. The accident also releases a 1930s gangster from the TV film world into the real one, causing chaos after Matt is mistaken for the criminal after a bank robbery.

== Production ==
The Flatworld sequences of the film were created using cuts that required great engineering work and a budget of more than 1.6 million dollars to make 29 minutes and 37 seconds of film. The characters were traditionally animated on paper to check the fluidity of the movement. Each drawing was photocopied, glued to the card, coloured, and trimmed carefully. Each clipped image was weighted at its base so that it could be held upright, and then the images were placed on the cardboard and filmed. Flatworld used approximately 40,000 individual cardboard cutouts.
