= Nationalism in the United Kingdom =

Nationalism in the United Kingdom may refer to:

- British nationalism
- Cornish nationalism
- English nationalism
- Irish nationalism
- Scottish nationalism
- Ulster nationalism
- Welsh nationalism
