= Good Night Malvinas =

- Narrated by: Rafael Spregelburd
- Music by: Sebastián Escofet; Rodrigo Sánchez
- Release date: 31 December 2020
- Country: Argentina
- Language: Spanish

Good Night Malvinas (Buenas noches Malvinas) is an Argentine documentary film about the Falklands War, directed by Ana Fraile and Lucas Scavino. It premiered on December 31, 2020.

== Synopsis ==
In April 1982, Dalmiro Bustos and Elena Noseda face one of the most difficult moments of their lives when their eldest son, Fabián, is sent to fight in the Malvinas Islands along with hundreds of conscript soldiers. Almost 40 years after the events, Dalmiro, Elena and their two youngest children, Javier and María Elena, tell what they could not say then, in an attempt to follow in Fabián's footsteps and put into words the anguish and pain that they still remain.

== Interviewees ==
People interviewed for the film:

- Dalmiro Busts
- Elena Noseda
- Javier Bustos
- Maria Elena Bustos
- Raphael Spregelburd (rapporteur)

== Comments ==
José Luis Visconti on the site 'hárselacritica' wrote:

”If war is an experience usually associated with the collective –since its center is the armies and the primacy of the numerical-, what the documentary does is to bring it to an individualized expression: the historical facts cease to matter…The war becomes a background on which what begins to matter is what each one does in the face of that circumstance.…The recovery of history closes with Fabián, who appears in the story, as if he were returning from Malvinas again, only after his family tells of his return in the past. His body in the present does not exhibit the traces of the past: it is his memory that recovers that past in the same way that his family does. In any case, his story is more than that of a soldier in a specific war like the Malvinas. It is the putting into words –and on screen- of what can be done in a war and what can be done with it afterwards. The entire documentary revolves around that idea and it is for this reason that it does not detach itself from its central nucleus constituted by that family. Because in each of them, in each story that unfolds, there is a possible answer to that question.

Leandro Arteaga in Página 12 opined:

"It is remarkable how the film is organized from an arrangement of sequences that gradually organize the proposal, while they say about its main character. The axis of Good night Malvinas is set on Fabián Bustos, a former combatant who collected his memories in the book Chronicles of a soldier. However, the film first privileges the figure of his brother, visiting the island. While he frequents specific places, the voice-over (by Rafael Spregelburd) that emerges from reading those pages interacts. It will be known later which book it is, also who the visitor from Malvinas is...one of the most particular moments to which the film dares: bringing Fabián's two brothers together with a theater group that will rework their dialogues and evocations. The film's corollary is provided in a privileged way by the figure and word of Fabián Bustos. And it gives final shape to a precise film, which count your hi story in a close, sensitive way, with the ability to say a lot from a life story that is also that of everyone who surrounds him and loves him."
