= Monumento a los caídos en Malvinas =

Monument in Buenos Aires, Argentina

Monument to the fallen in the Falklands
- Monumento a los caídos en Malvinas
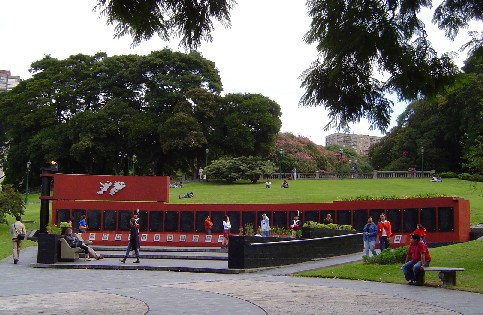
- Monumento a los caídos en Malvinas, in the Plaza San Martín.
- Location: Avenida del Libertador, San Martín, Buenos Aires, Argentina
- Coordinates: 34°35′38.2″S 58°22′30.3″W
- Designer: Andrés Morán
- Opening date: June 24, 1990
- Dedicated to: Argentine soldiers killed in Falklands War

The Monumento a los caídos en Malvinas (transl. Monument to the Fallen in the Falklands) is a cenotaph in Plaza San Martín, in Buenos Aires, dedicated to the 649 Argentine soldiers who were killed in the Falklands War. The inscription reads La nación también rinde homenaje a los que guardan en su cuerpo o memoria las huellas del combate. (transl. The nation also honors those who store in their bodies or their memories the footprints of combat.)

== History ==
During the presidency of Carlos Menem, he passed national decree no. 1405 on December 11, 1989, which called for the erection of a cenotaph monument, dedicated to those who died during the Falklands War, in the Buenos Aires area.

A municipal decree in 1990 determined that the site would be located in the Retiro neighborhood in Plaza Libertador General San Martín, on Leandro N. Alem Avenue. The decree stated that the location had been chosen because it meets "historical, operational, and locational" criteria. The area's "characteristics, ease of access, and the width of Leandro N. Alem Avenue allow for large gatherings and provide an appropriate context for any ceremonies; and special consideration was given to not altering the existing spatial, circulatory, and arboreal structure".

The chosen site sparked debate: some believed the plaza should be preserved solely as a tribute to General San Martín; others argued it shouldn't be placed directly opposite the Torre Monumental; still others felt the location, with its high traffic, was noisy and therefore unsuitable for a monument to the dead; and there were also those who protested the destruction of the plaza's green ravine. However, the opposition did not stop the construction of the monument, which was officially inaugurated on June 24, 1990.

== Characteristics ==
The building was designed by the architect Ana Beatriz Penna. The site where it was located occupies 263 m² and is situated at the foot of the ravine that Plaza San Martín has on its east side, on Leandro N. Alem Avenue.

The western section of the monument consists of a vertical, semicircular wall with 25 black marble plaques bearing the names of the 649 combatants who died in the conflict, without indicating their military rank, to honor them equally. These plaques were carved by the sculptor Eduardo Omar Urich. Above this wall, on the north side, is a prism-shaped structure depicting the silhouette of the Falkland Islands and a votive lamp. In front of the wall, parallel to it but much lower, is a wall displaying the provincial and national coats of arms.

Two low structures, each with seating, form a semicircle, symbolizing two arms encircling a flagpole from which the Argentine flag flies . A commemorative plaque reads: " The nation also pays homage to those who bear in their bodies or memories the marks of combat ." Surrounding the flagpole, on the ground, is a circular design representing the national cockade . A cross is also drawn on the ground between the flagpole and Alem Avenue.

An escort from one of the three armed forces always guards the monument.

== Ceremonial use ==
Since its inauguration, it has been the central headquarters for the commemorations of Veterans' Day and the Fallen in the Falklands War in the City of Buenos Aires, which is celebrated on April 2nd of each year.

== See also ==
- 1982 Liberation Memorial
- Tomb of the Unknown Soldier
