= Julian Nott =

British composer (born 1960)

- Born: Julian Francis Kandahar Nott; 24 November 1960 (age 65); Marylebone, London, England
- Occupations: Composer, conductor, producer
- Years active: 1988–present

Julian Francis Kandahar Nott (born 24 November 1960) is a British composer and conductor, mostly of animated films. His credits include Wallace & Gromit and Peppa Pig.

== Biography ==
Nott was born in Marylebone, London on 24 November 1960, the son of Miloska Nott and John Nott; his sister is Sasha Swire. He was educated at Eton College and Lady Margaret Hall, Oxford, where he studied Music and Philosophy, Politics and Economics and was the college organ scholar. After a few years working for Arthur Andersen Management Consultants in the City (now Accenture) and writing freelance for The Economist Group, he enrolled at the British National Film and Television School. There, he met the creator of the Wallace and Gromit series, Nick Park. They both received recognition for the work they did there, including Park's student film A Grand Day Out.

After leaving the National Film and Television School, Nott worked for some years as a documentary film-maker, making films for Channel 4 and other broadcasters until he gradually switched to a career in television and film composing.

His credits include many dramas for BBC such as the popular Lark Rise to Candleford and ITV's The Vice.

Nott has also directed and written one feature film of his own, a 2001 comedy entitled Weak at Denise.

In 2006, he won an Annie Award for his score on Wallace & Gromit: The Curse of the Were-Rabbit and an Ivor Novello Award in 2009 for the Wallace and Gromit film A Matter of Loaf and Death. As a producer, he received a BAFTA nomination for the short film "Chicken" in 1990.

Nott is a director of the Performing Right Society and the Mechanical-Copyright Protection Society.

== Selected filmography ==
=== Film ===
Year	Title	Director(s)	Notes
1988	Rarg	Tony Collingwood	Thanks
1988	Queen Sacrifice	Julian Richards	Short film
1988	Water's Edge	Suri Krishnamma	Short film
1989	A Grand Day Out	Nick Park	Short film
1989	Perfect Image?	Maureen Blackwood	Short film
1989	The Hill Farm	Mark Baker	Short film
1989	The Child Eater	Jonathan Tammuz	Short film
1989	The Candy Show	Peter Hewitt	Short film
1990	Lorna Doone	Andrew Grieve	TV movie
1992	Springing Lenin	Andrey Nekrasov	Music arranger
1992	Swords at Teatime	David Freeman	Short film
1993	The Wrong Trousers	Nick Park	Short film
1993	Not Without My Handbag	Boris Kossmehl	Short film
1993	The Village	Mark Baker	Short film
1993	The World of Eric Carle	Andrew Goff	
1994	Les quatre lieutenants français	Patrick Jeudy	Documentary
1994	A Man of No Importance	Suri Krishnamma	
1995	Mothers Courage	Michael Verhoeven	
1995	A Close Shave	Nick Park	Short film
1996	Reef Encounter	Unknown	
1997	The Place of the Dead	Suri Krishnamma	TV movie
1997	Flatworld	Daniel Greaves	Short film
1997	Stage Fright	Steve Box	Short film
1998	T.R.A.N.S.I.T.	Piet Kroon	Short film
1999	Jolly Roger	Mark Baker	Short film
1999	Weak at Denise	Julian Nott	Also director, co-writer and producer
2000	New Year's Day	Suri Krishnamma	
2001	Christmas Carol: The Movie	Jimmy T. Murakami	
2001	Gentlemen's Relish	Douglas Mackinnon	TV movie
2002	War Game	Dave Unwin	Short film
2003	Gifted	Douglas Mackinnon	TV movie
2005	Wallace & Gromit: The Curse of the Were-Rabbit	Nick Park and Steve Box	Score produced by Hans Zimmer
2006	Shoot the Messenger	Ngozi Onwurah	
2006	Anna and the Moods	Gunnar Karlsson	Short film
2007	Confessions of a Diary Secretary	Andy Wilson	TV movie
2007	Heavy Petting	Marcel Sarmiento	
2008	Wallace & Gromit: A Matter of Loaf and Death	Nick Park	Short film
2009	Ingenious	Brian Kelly	TV movie
2011	The Decoy Bride	Sheree Folkson	
2012	Jubilee Bunt-a-thon	Nick Park	Short film
2014	On Angel Wings	Dave Unwin	Short film
2014	The Incredible Adventures of Professor Branestawm	Sandy Johnson	TV movie
2015	A Grand Night In: The Story of Aardman	Richard Mears and Merlin Crossingham	Documentary, appears as himself
2024	Wallace & Gromit: Vengeance Most Fowl	Nick Park and Merlin Crossingham	With Lorne Balfe

=== TV ===
Year	Title	Notes
1991–1994	Equinox	TV documentary, director
1996	Tales from the Crypt	1 episode ("Confession")
1997–1998	The Grand	
1997	Original Sin	Mini-series
1998	A Respectable Trade	Mini-series
1998	Out of Hours	Mini-series
1998	The Grand	Theme music
1999	The Vice	6 episodes
1999	The Wonderful World of Disney	1 episode ("H-E Double Hockey Sticks")
1999–2000	Sunburn	
2001	The Cazalets	3 episodes
2002	Outside the Rules	
2002	Wallace & Gromit's Cracking Contraptions	
2003	Death in Holy Orders	Mini-series
2004–present	Peppa Pig	
2008–2011	Lark Rise to Candleford	
2009–2013	Ben & Holly's Little Kingdom	
2010	Wallace and Gromit's World of Invention	
2011	The Royal Bodyguard	
2012	Wallace & Gromit's Musical Marvels	
2014–2019	Bing	
2015	Britain's Got Talent	1 episode ("2015: Live Semi-Final 4")
2018	Rick and Rat go to Thailand	Director
2019	Ink Rookies	Documentary series, producer
2019	Three Chords	TV documentary, director and producer
2019	Dick in Ibiza	Mini-series, writer
2019	Chained Attraction	Executive producer
2019	Meet Puppets	Director (2 episodes), executive producer (4 episodes)
2020	The Compendium of Shitty Men	Mini-series, writer and executive producer
2020	Student Cooking Challenge	Executive producer
2020	Infatuation – Island of Love	Executive producer
2021	Liars	Director (1 episode)
