= Liberation Day (Falkland Islands) =

National holiday in the Falkland Islands

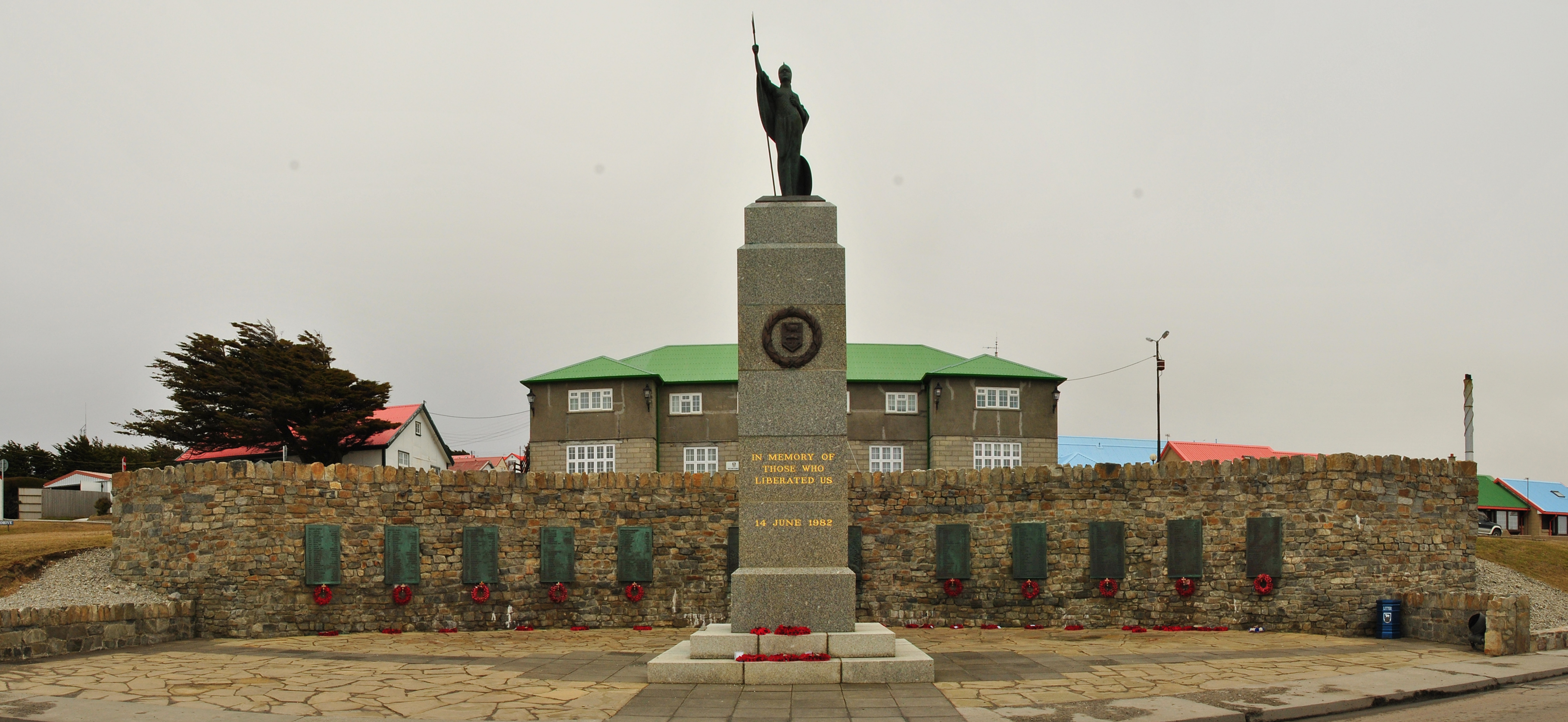
- The Liberation Memorial in Stanley
- Official name: Liberation Day
- Observed by: Falkland Islands
- Type: National Day
- Observances: Thanksgiving service, Wreath laying, Military parade
- Date: 14 June
- Next time: 14 June 2027
- Frequency: annual
- Related to: Occupation of the Falkland Islands during Falklands War

Liberation Day is the National Day of the Falkland Islands and commemorates the liberation of the Falkland Islanders from Argentine military occupation at the end of the Falklands War in June 1982. It is celebrated annually on 14 June.

== Background ==
Falkland Islands is an archipelago in the South Atlantic Ocean off the coast of Argentina. While it had been occupied by several European nations previously, it was under British possession since 1833. On 2 April 1982, Argentina invaded and occupied the islands, claiming Argentine sovereignty over the archipelago. The British Armed Forces commenced a naval assault to retake the islands. On 12 June 1982, the British forces surrounded the capital of Stanley and blockaded its port. Argentinean forces surrendered shortly thereafter and the Argentine military occupation officially ended after 74 days on 14 June 1982.

== Observance ==
Liberation Day commemorates the liberation of the Falkland Islanders from the Argentinian occupation by the British Armed Forces at the end of the war. Liberation Day is celebrated annually on 14 June (observed on 15 June when 14th is a Sunday) and is a public holiday in Falkland Islands. Commemorations on the day include a thanksgiving service at Christ Church Cathedral, followed by wreath laying at the Liberation Memorial and a military parade in Stanley. The Liberation memorial commemorates the lives lost in the Falklands war and consists of an obelisk surmounted by a bronze statue of Britannia holding a trident, with the coat of arms of the Falkland Islands surrounded by a wreath in the front of it.

== See also ==
- Battle of the Falkland Islands
