= Béla Horváth =

Hungarian public servant and politician

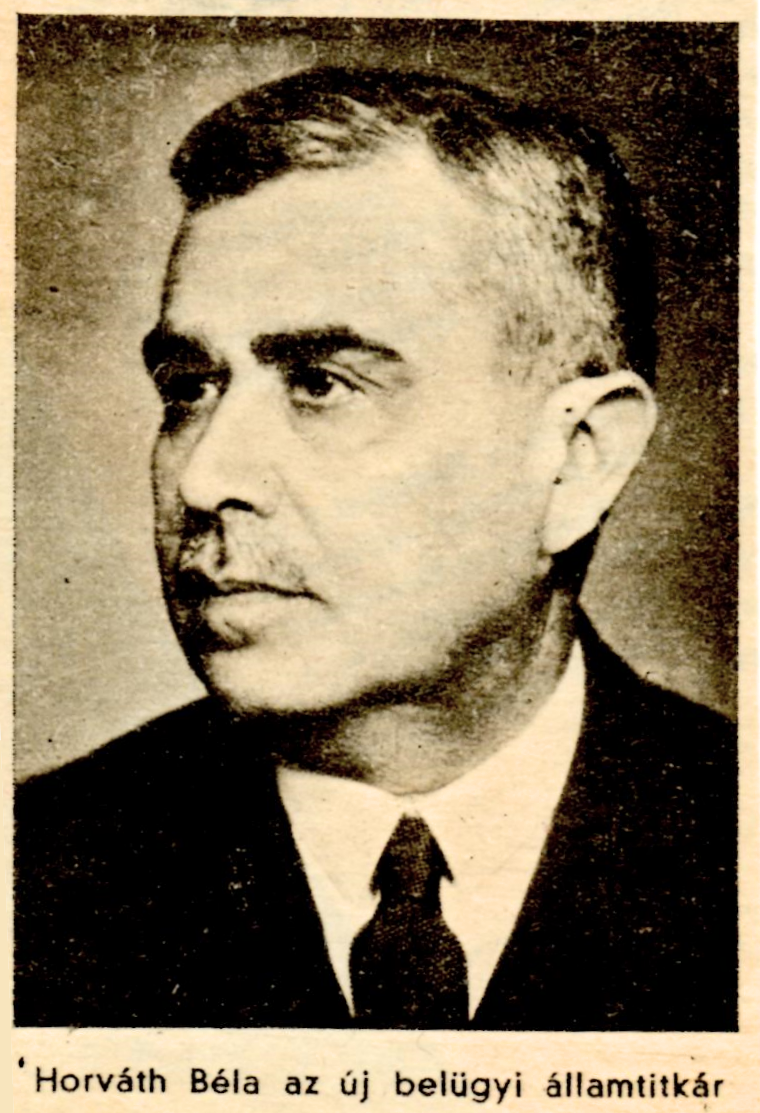
- Photograph from 1944 news article reporting Dr. Béla Horváth's appointment as acting Interior Minister of Hungary

Secretary of State for the Interior
- In office 9 September 1944 – 16 October 1944
- Minister: Miklós Bonczos (Horváth was appointed when Bonczos did not serve)

Personal details
- Born: 29 January 1886 Apatelek, Austria-Hungary (today Mocrea, Romania)
- Died: 3 October 1978 (aged 92) Budapest, Hungary
- Spouse: Sarolta Bund
- Children: 2
- Profession: public servant, politician

Béla Horváth de Szentgyörgy (29 January 1886 – 3 October 1978) was a Hungarian public servant and politician, who served as Secretary of State for the Interior in the cabinet of Prime Minister Géza Lakatos for a brief time between September and October 1944.

== Biography ==
Béla Horváth was born into a Roman Catholic noble family on 29 January 1886 in Apatelek, Arad County in Austria-Hungary (now Mocrea, Romania), as the son of Gyula Horváth (1852–1924), who served as Prefect of Zimbró, Apatelek, Borosjenő and finally Sikló. Béla Horváth graduated in 1903 from the Reformed Church College in Szászváros (now Orăștie, Romania), where he was a classmate and friend of Petru Groza. He went to Budapest and graduated in 1907 from the "School of Law and Political Science" at the University of Budapest (present-day Eötvös Loránd University). Following this, he began doctoral studies in political science at the Franz Joseph University in Kolozsvár (now Cluj-Napoca). In January 1911, Horváth began his career at the Interior Ministry in Budapest. His poor eyesight prevented his service in the First World War.

Following the fall of the Hungarian Soviet Republic in August 1919, Horváth was reinstated to the Ministry of Interior. From December 1919, Horváth worked principally in the Interior Ministry's legislative-drafting department, where he remained for approximately twenty-five years. His work included the preparation of major administrative legislation. He participated in drafting the administrative reform legislation introduced in 1928 and was involved in the preparation of the accompanying parliamentary material. He also collaborated with officials of the Interior and Justice ministries on the compilation of Magyar törvények és egyéb jogszabályok mutatója (Index of Hungarian Laws and Other Legal Regulations), a comprehensive index of Hungarian legislation and regulations. He was appointed a secretary in the minister's office on 30 August 1921. He became head of a department within the ministry on 30 June 1928. He was granted the rank of ministerial councillor on 24 August 1931. Horváth was entitled as secretary of state on 4 July 1941.

In 1926, Béla Horváth married Sarolta Bund (1900–1982), daughter of Károly Bund (1869–1931). They had two children, a daughter (Magda) born in 1927 and a son (George) born in 1931.

As fascist and antisemitic politicians gained influence in Hungary in the late 1930s, Horváth opposed the government's antisemitic legislation. According to his later recollections, he refused to countersign the promulgation of the First Anti-Jewish Law and subsequently also refused to countersign the Second Anti-Jewish Law. He also came into conflict with László Endre, a senior official in Pest-Pilis-Solt-Kiskun County who later became one of the principal organizers of the deportation of Hungarian Jews.

Following the German occupation of Hungary on 19 March 1944, Horváth was removed from office in April and retired from government service. He subsequently withdrew from public life and spent much of the following months at the family's property in Parád. His removal preceded the principal period of the Hungarian authorities' mass deportations of Jews from the countryside. He returned to government service only after the formation of the Lakatos government in August 1944.

On September 9, 1944, Béla Horváth was appointed Secretary of State for the Interior, and thus acting minister during the brief Lakatos government, as Minister Miklós Bonczos was ill and unable to fulfill his duties. In that capacity, Horváth collaborated with Swedish diplomat Raoul Wallenberg to save the lives of many Jews in Budapest. Horváth provided Wallenberg the use of the Ministry's printing press to prepare Swedish "protective passports," which identified the Hungarian Jewish bearers as Swedish subjects awaiting repatriation. Horváth also ordered Hungarian gendarmes to prevent the deportation from Hungary of any Jewish person, using force if necessary. With the Arrow Cross coup on October 16, 1944, Béla Horváth was dismissed from this position and placed under house arrest.

Despite Horváth's dismissal and house arrest, Wallenberg visited him at his home on the night of 18 October 1944 and provided Swedish protective documents for Horváth and his family.

After the war, the new socialist Hungarian government asked Béla Horváth to serve as Interior Minister, but he declined the offer. In 1951, Béla Horváth and family were exiled for several years to Hajdúdorog (Hajdú-Bihar County), but then returned to Budapest.

In 1953, while Horváth was living in exile at Hajdúdorog, he was invited to Romania by his former schoolmate Petru Groza, then chairman of Romania's State Council, for a reunion marking the fiftieth anniversary of their 1903 graduation from the Reformed college in Szászváros. Groza subsequently intervened on Horváth's behalf, and Horváth's pension was restored. The reunion and Horváth's participation in it have also been documented in later Hungarian research based on school records and contemporary family recollections.

Béla Horváth died in Budapest on 3 October 1978 and was buried at the Farkasréti Cemetery.

== Sources ==
- Francz, Norbert (2021-02-22). "Egy elfeledett államtitkár: Horváth Béla életpályája, I. rész [A forgotten Secretary of State: the career of Béla Horváth Vol. 1]". Napi Történelmi Forrás (ntf.hu).
- Francz, Norbert (2021-02-21). "Egy elfeledett államtitkár: Horváth Béla életpályája, II. rész [A forgotten Secretary of State: the career of Béla Horváth Vol. 2]". Napi Történelmi Forrás (ntf.hu).
- Hollósi, Gábor (2016). Dr. vitéz ákosfalvi Szilágyi László belügyminiszteri tanácsos visszaemlékezése az 1944-es menekítésekre (PDF). VERITAS Történetkutató Intézet. ISBN 978-615-5465-79-6.
- Kandó Melocco, Ferenc (2015). An Anti-Nazi at Hitler’s Table. EKO Communications. ISBN 9781505905564.
- Miklós, Dániel (2024-11-06). "Petru Groza karórája". Napi Történelmi Forrás.

Political offices
Preceded by Miklos Bonczos	Minister of the Interior; 1944	Succeeded by Péter Schell
