= Júlia Báthory =

Hungarian glass designer (1901–2000)

- Born: December 31, 1901; Budapest, Austria-Hungary
- Died: May 3, 2000 (aged 98); Pécsvárad, Hungary
- Occupation: Porcelain designer (1920s-1929) Glass artist (1929-1970) (1989-2000) Teacher (1953-1970)
- Years active: 1929–2000
- Known for: Glass art
- Honours: Mihály Munkácsy Prize (1957) Hungarian Heritage Award (2000)

Júlia Báthory (December 31, 1901 – May 3, 2000) was a Hungarian glass designer.

In the course of her graphic studies she became fascinated by glasswork, and in 1929 she started her career as an independent glass-designer in Dessau. The Bauhaus School was located in Dessau at this time and was an influence on Báthory, who attended lectures at the school. Between 1930 and 1931 she returned to Budapest. Her exhibition in 1930 in Paris with sculptor Imre Huszár was such a success that she decided to move there. From 1932 until 1939 she lived in Paris, where she founded her own studio called La Girouette.

All her works focus on figures or relate stories with a special humor, dignity or, in turn, the sublime.

== Early life ==
Júlia Báthory was born in 1901 in Budapest into an aristocratic family. She pursued her high school studies in Debrecen and Budapest. In 1924, she went to Munich, Germany, where she graduated at the Stadtschule für Angewendte Kunst in with an interest in graphic art. While there, she was a student of Adelbert Niemeyer, a painter and porcelain designer, and a family relative of the well known Brazilian architect, Oscar Niemeyer. She also took lectures from local painter Max Müller (not related to the orientalist). Her fellow student was Margit Kovács, the well known Hungarian ceramic artist, with whom she had a lifelong, close friendship.

== Paris years – 1930–1940 ==
Báthory's ten years in Paris were the most productive years of her life. During this time she visited excavations from the Roman period in the south of France, and traveled to Italy, Germany, Switzerland, and Belgium. She lived as a member of the Hungarian colony, formed by Endre Rozsda, Brassaï, and André Kertész. During her first years in Paris, she shared an apartment together with Andre Kertész and Margit Kovács. After her exhibition in 1930, she presented her first independent show in 1933. She received a diplome d'honneur at the 1937 Paris World's Fair. That same year, she made an interior column-panneau for Le Printemps. Báthory was a member and permanent exhibitor of the Salon d'Automne, formed by Matisse and the fauvists, where famous French glass designers Maurice Marinot and René Lalique also exhibited. She produced revolutionary flat glass design artifacts for "La Crémmaiere", and made panneaux for the interior decoration department of Louis Cartier's store at Rue de la Paix. Her works were sold by Christofle in Paris. In 1934, she converted an old dairy hall near the Sorbonne (7bis Rue Laromiguiere, Paris Ve) into her own atelier (or workshop), named Studio La Girouette.

Báthory produced her own designs in small series by the Swedish Orrefors Glasbruk. She got her flat glass boards from Belgium. She also dealt with interior decoration: she designed and produced furniture. She had great success not only with her figural panneau, but with her plaquettes, decorated with abstract animals. In 1937, the city of Paris bought her plaquette called The Hunting (La Chasse) and an engraved vase. These two pieces of art were later placed in the collection of modern art of the Louvre. She achieved her greatest success by working with cold glass, by monumental, sculptural drawing-derived forms, while her contemporaries, Lalique, Marinot and his circle made their art in glass-works and treated glass as one block.

Her invention and trademark was a unique use of intaglio engraving, cutting, and the artistic use of the sand-blasting technique. She was able to create prominent visual effects with their combination.

French critiques used the expression of glass sculptor: "reliefs du verre" and "sculpteur en verre" to describe her works; instead of the applied artist, "artiste decorateur". She visited home in 1938 to exhibit her work and received a Professional Silver Medal. That same year she was an invited exhibitor of the City of Paris. The following year she reached overwhelming success overseas. She returned from the 1939 New York World's Fair with a diploma of honor.

== Move back to Hungary – 1940 ==
Báthory remained in Paris until late 1939, but moved to Budapest in January 1940 in order to save her studio during World War II. She worked continuously until 1944, when the operations of war and the Red Army reached Hungary. During this period she received a number of awards and accolades, including a gold medal at the Milan Triennial VII in 1940, awards from the Ministry of Culture in 1942 and 1943, an award from the city of Kassa in the Second Hungarian Exhibition of Applied Arts, a silver medal from the National Organisation of the Applied Artists of Hungary, and a gold medal from Budapest.

Báthory worked abroad with interior designer Elek Falus during this period. She produced engraved and cut figural panneau that covered columns for the Zürich exhibition hall of the Goldberger Textil Company. Many of her pieces at this time were ecclesiastical. These pieces continued a religious theme she had used earlier when creating work in 1937 for the Exhibition of Religious Art (l'Exposition d'art religieux, 1935) in Strasbourg. She received great attention for one of her engraved triptichons.

In the duration of World War II, Báthory's studio was almost completely destroyed. After the war ended she was frequently robbed, and a great number of irreplaceable documents, machines, and works of art disappeared. Her return to Hungary - originally intended as a temporary stay - became permanent. Despite the thefts and her separation from Paris, Báthory continued her work with enthusiasm. In 1949, she created an educational system for glass design at the Moholy-Nagy University of Art and Design (formerly known as the College of Applied Arts), however, the system could not be realized at that time. Years later in 1952, she founded the Glass Faculty at the Secondary School of Fine Arts and Applied Arts in Budapest, where evening studies of glassworking existed since 1933 by the Hungarian painter Zoltán Veress. In 1953, she had the opportunity to enact her educational system as a teacher at the Secondary School of Fine and Applied Arts.

== Júlia Báthory, the teacher 1953–1970 ==
The glass design program Báthory created was a unique initiative and the first glass art department in Europe, ten years before the studio glass movement in the USA. As a teacher, her guiding principle was a system which originated in natural forms and the realization of the potential of glass. She constructed the whole basis of theoretical and practical education of glass design in Hungary. The system is similar to the Kodály-method. Students learn how to work with hot glass, use drawing-derived techniques, and are exposed to the whole range of glass-work. This method greatly influenced the education of glass-art, and also changed the whole structure of secondary art-education in Hungary. She was presented with the Munkácsy prize and the title of Excellent Teacher in thanks for her work.

At this time Báthory's attention turned towards the possibilities of hot glass. In 1958, she exhibited at the Brussels World's Fair – her last public, international show. She returned from Brussels with a diplome d'honeur. She was awarded for her work again in 1967 and 1968. Báthory retired from teaching in 1970, but continued to work in her studio and started to organize her life's work.

== Last years – 1990–2000 ==
Júlia Báthory's artistic resurrection was brought about in 1989 with the change of the Hungarian political and economical system. The 88-year-old artist set up her studio again with the help of her adopted son, András Szilágyi, and her daughter-in-law, Júlia Kovács. Báthory decided to recreate pieces from her collection of work that were lost or destroyed.

In 1991, she received the Golden Wreath-ornamented Star-order of the Hungarian Republic, and became full member of the Széchenyi Academy of Literature and Art in the Fine Arts Department. Her life work was exhibited in the Hungarian Museum of Applied Arts in 1992. She died in Pécsvárad at the age of 98 in 2000. She was bestowed the Hungarian Heritage Award posthumously later that year.

Since then, András Szilágyi, her stepson, and Júlia Kovács, her daughter-in-law, are running a permanent museum and continues to run Báthory's studio; La Girouette, which reproduces these works and carries out Báthory's designs. Since September 2000, the Báthory Júlia glass-collection is opened to the public in Dömsöd.

== Bibliography ==
- Au Salon d'Autumn: Art et Décoration, 1930/2 p177-194, 1932/2 p 353–364, 1933/2, 1938/ p214-222, p230-232, p235, p250, p254, p256
- Arwas, Victor: Glass: Art Nouveau to Art Deco, Yale University Press, London – New York, 1977
- Bachet, Roger:T.S.F. et Décoration - Un probléme d'esthétique, Plaisir de France, 1937 November
- Beard, Geoffrey: International Modern Glass, Barrie & Jenkins, 1976, London
- Brinhammer, Yvonne – Tise, Suzanne: French Decorative Art 1900–1942, Flammarion, 1990, Paris
- Bruckhardt, Lucius: The Werkbund: Studies in the History and Ideology of the Deutscher Werkbund, Design Council, London, 1980
- Campbell, Joan: The German Werkbund: The Politics of Reform in Applied Arts, Princeton University Press, 1978
- Drescher Károly – Rudák István – Száder Rudolf: Szakmai alapismeretek üvegesek részére, Építésügyi Tájékoztató Kózpont, 1981, Budapest
- Duncan, Alastair: Art Deco, Thames & Hudson, 1995, London
- Falus János: Báthory Júlia, Magyar Iparművészet, 2000/3 p14-17
- Gurmai Mihály dr.: Az üvegművészet technikái, Tankönyvkiadó - MIF, 1980, Budapest
- Hallóssy István: A párizsi világkiállítás magyar pavilonjának sikermérlege, Budapest, 1937
- Hoffman, Josef – Wagenfeld, Wilhelm: Glas-kunst der Moderne, Klinkhardt & Biermann, 1992, München
- ifj Richter Aladár: Báthory Júlia, Magyar Iparművészet, 1937/ p42-43, p48-49, p157-162
- kat.: Exposition 1937 Paris, Paris, 1937
- Kovács Anikó – Szilágyi András: Interjú Báthory Júliával, Széchenyi István Irodalmi és Művészeti Akadémia, magnóval rögzített, utólag legépelt anyag iksz.: MA-52-1/94
- Le Corbusier: L’Art Décoratif d’aujord’hui, 1925, Párizs
- Lengyel Ferenc: Az 1939 évi new yorki világkiállítás és a gyorsközlekedési úthálózat fejlődése, Budapest, 1939
- Lhote, R.: Au Salon d'Automne - Julia de Bathory, Glaces et Verres, 1937
- Lotz, Wilhelm: Exposition der Deutscher Werkbund á Paris, Die Form, 1930/5.
- Magyar Iparművészet, 1941/ p133-138, p145
- Melegati, Luca: Az üveg, Officina Nova, 1995, Budapest
- Mihalik Sándor: Az első Magyar Országos Iparművészeti Tárlat, Magyar Iparművészet,
- Muller, Joseph-Émile – Elgar, Frank: Modern Painting, Eyre Meuthen, 1980, London
- nn.: A kassai Országos iparművészeti tárlat krónikája, Magyar Iparművészet, 1942-44/1943/ p61-63, p67, p103, p112-114
- nn.: A new yorki világkiállítás magyar pavilonja, Magyar Iparművészet, 1939/ p154, p157-164
- nn.: Az 1940-es Egyházművészeti kiállítás mérlege, Magyar Iparművészet, 1941/ p29-30, p33, Dr Ruzicska Ilona: „Művészet az iparban” Az iparművészeti Társulat karácsonyi tárlata,
- nn.: Az Orsz. Magy. Iparművészeti Társulat nyári tárlatának mérlege, Magyar Iparművészet, 1931/ p133,141
- nn.: Beszámoló a Brüsszeli világkiállításról, Magyar Építőművészet, 1958/2 p47-51, 1959/1-2
- nn.: Egy Debreceni származású magyar hölgy nagy sikere az országos iparművészeti kiállításon Hajdúföld, 1929 július 17.
- nn.: Magyarország az 1937 évi világkiállításon, Budapest, 1937
- nn.: Salon d’Automne, L’Illustration, 1937/4 p 354–368, 1934/2 p433-451, 1935/1 p126 1936/2 p456-467 1937/2 p360-378
- Passarge, Walter: Deutsche Werkkunst der Gegenwart, Im Rembrandt Verlag, 1934, Berlin
- Pasurek, Gustav E.: Gläser der Empire und Biedermeierzeit, 1925, Lipcse
- R.M.U.: Les expositions des Décorateurs, Beaux-Arts: Le Journal des Arts, 1937 XII.24.
- Rivir, A.: L'Orvfévrerie, La renesaince, 1937/2
- Sághelyi Lajos, dr.: A magyar üvegesipar története, Budapesti Üvegesek Ipartestülete, 1938, Budapest
- Szablya János: A VII. Trienálé, Magyar Iparművészet, 1940/ p43-47, p51, p91-94
- Szilágyi B. András: Báthory Júlia, 2000, Báthory Júlia Üveggyűjtemény ISBN 963-00-9166-6
- Tasnádiné Marik Klára: A síküveg felhasználása belső térben, Építőanyag, XIX,évf. 1967/7 p245-249
- Varga Vera: Báthory Júlia - Párizs Budapest, az Iparművészeti Múzeum katalógusa, 1992, ISBN 963-7098-38-0
- Varga Vera: Báthory Júlia, Magyar Iparművészet, 1993/1 p46-50
- Varga Vera: Báthory Júlia, Új Művészet, 1991/12 p26-30
- Vávra, J.R.: Das Glas und die Jahrtausende, Artia, 1954, Prága
- Wettergen, Erik: The Modern Decorative Arts of Sweden, Malmö Museum – American-Scandinavian Foundation, 1926, Malmö - New York
- Woodham, Johnathan M.: Twentieth Century Design, Oxford History of Art, Oxford University Press, 1997, Oxford
