= Anna utca =

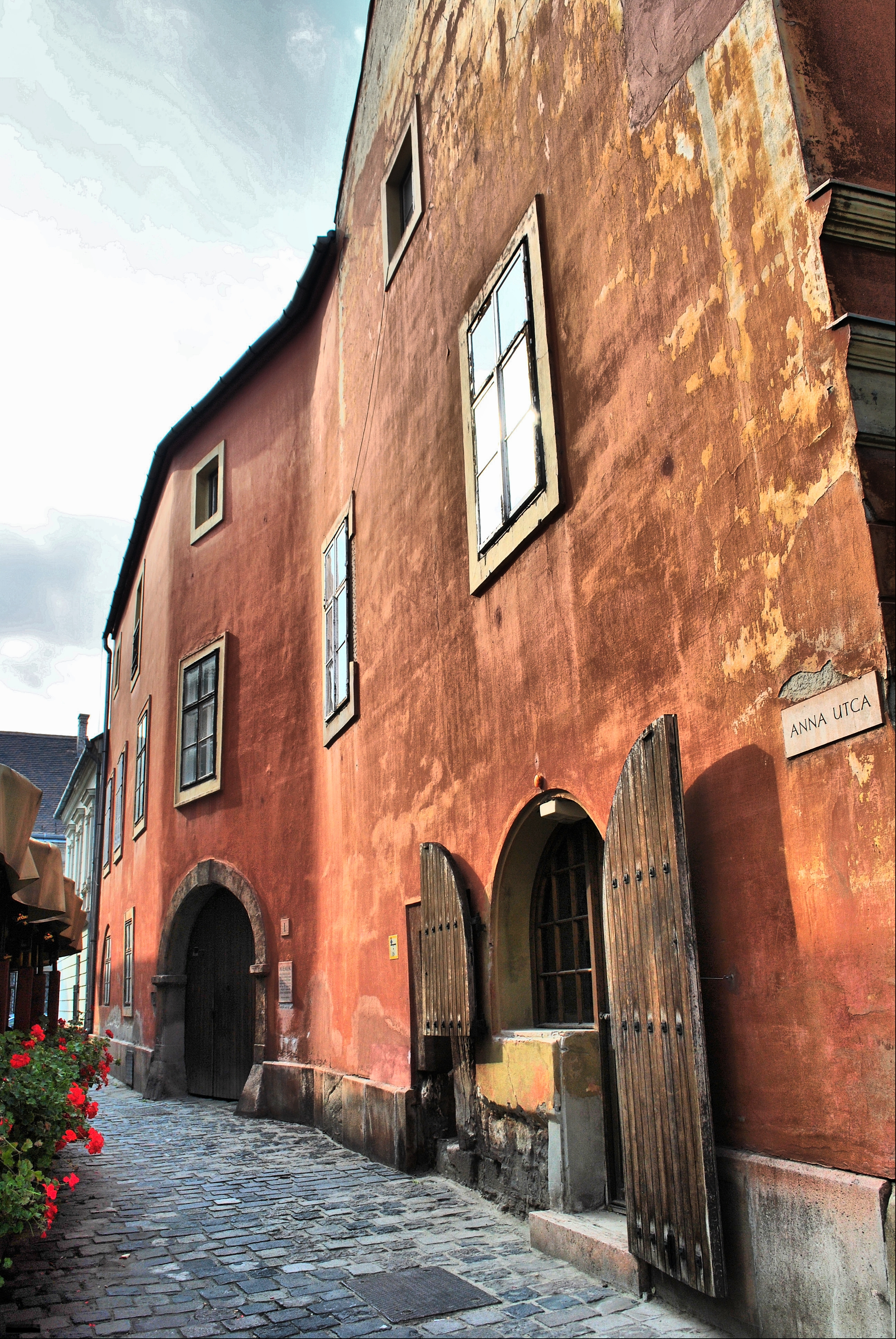
Anna utca

Anna utca is a street in the 1st District of Budapest, capital of Hungary. It runs between 16. Tárnok utca and 13 Úri utca.

== Origin of the name ==
The street is named after Agnes of Antioch (in Hungarian Antióchiai Anna), wife of Béla III. She is buried in the Church of Mary’s Assumption.

== Variants of the name ==
- Anna utca - 1879 (in English Anna Street)
- There is no writing evidence of the street between 1754 and 1879
- Dámvad utca; Őz utca - 1696 (in English Follow Deer Street, Roe Deer Street
- Dama Gasse (Hölgy utca) - 1686 (Dame Street)
- Gyógytár utca – at the beginning of the 16th Century Pharmacy Street
- They utca (Tej utca) - 1484 (Milk Street)

== Buildings ==
No. 1: A one-storey residential house at the corner of the street. There are six windows on both the facade and the other street side of the building. The door and window sides have Gothic parts, and some parts of the wall were built during the Middle Ages. It was fully renovated in 1712 by Doctor Lawrence. Arany Sas Gyógyszertár (Golden Eagle Pharmacy) operated here until 1745. Frames of the Tárnok utca side door are from around 1780. The facade was rebuilt in Classical style in 1820 but the Baroque statue niche was left in place. In 1974 Margit Kovács’s sculpture Madonna with Her Child was placed here. Some original ovens, door and window frames dating from the 16th century were found.

No. 2: This is a one-storey residential house with a facade broken with some cantilevers. It was underwalled during the 16th century. There are two old windows frames on the facade to the Anna utca. One is from the Middle Ages, and one is from the 15th century. Door is covered with barrel vault. It was reorganised at numerous occasions. In the Middle Ages it was two separate buildings. There was a lane between them up to the arriving of the Ottomans. This building was designed by Károly Hild for Rozália Weiner. It was rebuilt in 1934.

== Further literature ==
- Budapest műemlékei. Budapest, 1955
- Zakariás G. Sándor: Budapest. Budapest, 1961.

== Sources ==
- Budapest Lexikon
- Budapest teljes Utcanév Lexikona. Sprinter Kiadó - ISBN 963-9469-06-8
