= Ilona Kolonits =

Hungarian film director and news correspondent

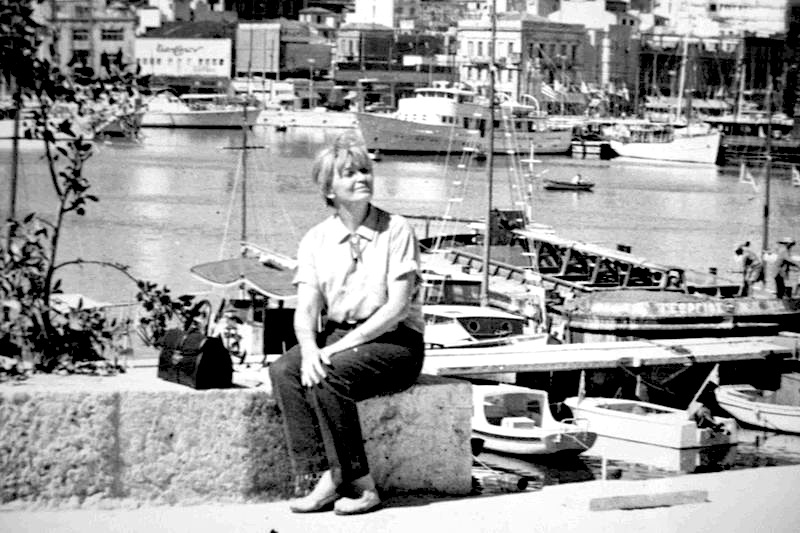
Illona Kolonits, 1960s

Ilona Kolonits (17 March 1922 in Budapest – 2 August 2002 in Budapest) was a Hungarian documentary film director and international news correspondent. She was an early war correspondent and also was among the first women to be film directors. Kolonits' films were known for their lyrical treatment of historical events and the lives of ordinary people. Kolonits received numerous awards, and nominations throughout her career, including international film festivals in Paris, Moscow, Oberhausen, Cortina d’Ampezzo, Berlin, Leipzig, Mexico City and Budapest. Kolonits has been awarded the title Righteous Among the Nations and the 'Pro Virtue' Award for Courage of the Republic of Hungary for saving the lives of many during the Second World War.

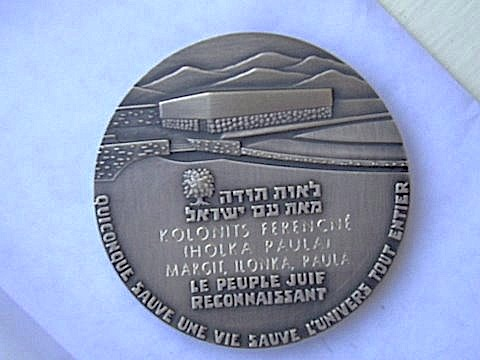
Ilona, Paulina, Paola and Margit Kolonits, Righteous Amongst the Nations Medal

== Biography ==
Kolonits was born in 1922 in Budapest to a family of notable humanitarian political activists. Her father Ferenc Kolonits and mother Paulina Kolonits (née Holka) took an active part in the Hungarian anti-fascist resistance movement in the Second World War. Ilona volunteered to rescue over 40 children from the Budapest Ghetto who were destined to be deported and killed in the Nazi's concentration camps. In 2007, alongside her mother and her two sisters, Margit and Paola Kolonits, she was awarded the Righteous Among the Nations title by Yad Vashem in recognition of saving the lives of numerous people during the Second World War. The Kolonits family sheltered in their country home and fashion boutique in Budapest a great number of Jewish people and anti-fascists persecuted by the Nazis this way saving them from being killed by the fascists in Hungary or in death camps. Ilona's elder sister, Margit rescued children of Jewish prisoners while they were being deported. Among others, the Kolonits family rescued and adopted an orphan of the Holocaust, Erzsebet Garai, the later well known film theoretician and editor of a renowned Film theory periodical, Filmkultura. In 1944, Ilona's father Ferenc was deported to the Buchenwald concentration camp for his anti-fascist activities along with other leading members of the Hungarian Social Democratic Party. He took an active role in organising the Buchenwald Resistance movement and fought to liberate the prisoners from the camp.

Ilona also took part in carrying messages during the Nazi occupation between groups taking part in resistance in various parts of Budapest. During the Siege of Budapest she was cut off from her family, on the other side of the city over the Danube river and was stranded in a cellar for several weeks without food and very little water. She wrote a farewell note to her family but was saved when the Nazis were driven out of Budapest by the advancing 2nd and 3rd Ukrainian Front of the Soviet Army. Having witnessed the brutal fascist persecutions, numerous atrocities from the Nazis against minorities, and the street fights in Budapest during the Second World War made a lasting impression on Ilona and formed her lifelong commitment to international peace and humanitarian affairs.

As a child Ilona was interested in drama, acting and athletic sports. After the Second World War she studied at the Academy of Drama and Film in Budapest and subsequently went on to study film directing. She wrote her thesis in Documentary Cinema, and in 1954 became a Fellow of the Hungarian Academy of Sciences, one of the first women to do so, alongside Dr. Elizabeth Garai and Yvette Biro. In the anti-fascist movement, she befriended many young Hungarian writers, artists and poets including the poet Attila József, and later she became a member of the Fészek Art Club in Budapest.

== Career ==
Between 1951 and 1989 Kolonits was a film director at the Mafilm Film Studios in Budapest and later at the Hungarian Documentary Film Studios. While other Hungarian filmmakers of her generation including Márta Mészáros and Ilona Katkics produced feature films, Kolonits remained faithful to her calling as a documentary filmmaker.

Kolonits was a dedicated documentary film director and international news and war correspondent. She shot over 500 newsreels and directed over one hundred documentaries, popular science and sport films, of which 17 received international and six Hungarian film awards. Kolonits risked her life in order to provide news from remote and conflict ridden parts of the world. She filmed armed conflicts in the Middle East and Far East in the 1960s and 1970s, accepting assignments turned down by her colleagues because of the dangers involved. Kolonits' poetic and expressive documentary cinema aimed to promote world peace, justice, equality and humanitarian causes. Kolonits often portrayed minority groups in her films, and she was in particular concerned with the cause of women and children whose lives were distraught by violent conflicts. One of her cinematic achievements is the short film Eroica (1975), which depicts the tragedy of the Vietnam War on the lives of women and children in a series of images edited to the sounds of Symphony No. 3 in E flat major (Op. 55) by Ludwig van Beethoven (known as the Eroica, Italian for "heroic") played by the Vietnam National Symphony Orchestra. Eroica advocates peace over war by expressing simultaneously the great sorrow of loss and the overwhelming joy of rebirth in peace lived by a whole nation.

Kolonits' best known and most disputed film is As It Happened (1957), a documentary portraying the events of the 1956 Uprising in Hungary. The film was edited from original footages which Kolonits herself shot on the streets of Budapest as none of the Hungarian film directors nor camera crews were prepared to work under the conditions of violent conflict. By risking her life while filming alone on the streets during the fights, Kolonits provided authentic documentary footages of the armed conflict. The political controversy surrounding this film related to the interpretation of the events through editing in years to come overshadowed the international cinematic heritage of Kolonits' humanist documentary cinema.

Kolonits' cinematic style has been characterised as lyrical and poetic. In her films she depicted the beauty and heroism in the everyday lives of people. Her kindness and compassion won hearts both in her home country and worldwide allowing Kolonits to portray intimate moments of joy and grief, traditions and customs of minority and ethnic communities, women and children. In 1955 she started a several-decades-long series of documentary films entitled Birthday following the lives of a group of women throughout their annual school reunions, this way presenting a very personal, feminine view of a generation. Among Kolonits' cinematic subjects were Fine Art. 'Thank You For The Clay' (Köszöntöm az agyagot) (1976) is a homage to the art and skill of the renewed Hungarian sculptor, Margit Kovacs. Kolonis' 1988 film You Like Horses, Don't You? addresses animal rights. Kolonits gave a lyrical homage to the city where she was born and which she loved in her film Budapest. The films of Kolonits are filed at the Hungarian National Digital Film Archives and Film Institute and are protected by the Hungarian Society for the Protection of Audio-Visual Authors' and Producers' Rights.

== Personal life ==
Kolonits was considered by those few who knew her well to be a kind, courageous, noble yet lighthearted person. She never gave interviews, enjoying a private and modest life with her parents in a green suburb of Budapest. Kolonits spent her free time between her parents, siblings and extended family with whom she shared her love of reading and nature walks. She collected in her home a considerable library and art collection, while often giving large amounts anonymously to charity in support of children orphaned due to violent conflicts and war.

The only known romantic interest Kolonits had was a platonic fascination with the Hungarian poet Attila József. Their age difference, József's engagement, and eventual early death made any relationship between them impossible. Kolonits was inspired by his artistic talent, patriotic feelings and pacifist activities. József's speeches at the meetings of the young anti-fascists, condemning social injustice, the death penalty and supporting the cause of the oppressed minorities had a profound influence on her during her youth, and Kolonits lived by these humanitarian values throughout her life.

Kolonits died in Budapest in 2002 at the age of 80. Her ashes are resting alongside those of her parents in the historical pantheon of the Farkasréti Cemetery in Budapest. Her last wish was for József's poem, At The Danube (1936), expressing a hope for peace and for national and international reconciliation, to be read at her memorial service.

== Selected awards ==
- 1963 - The Béla Balázs Award, Hungarian State Award for the Arts
- 1965 - The 'SZOT' Hungarian State Award
- 1973 - Distinguished Artist, Hungarian State Award
- 1979 - Award of The International Olympic Committee
- 1980 - Outstanding Artist, Hungarian State Award
- 2007 - 'Righteous Among the Nations', awarded by the Commission for Designation of the Righteous of the Holocaust Martyrs' and Heroes' Remembrance Authority (Yom HaShoah), Jerusalem, Israel
- Film and Cinematic Festival awards won by Kolonits included Paris, Moscow, Oberhausen, Cortina d’Ampezzo, Mexico City, Budapest and Miskolc .

== Selected filmography ==
- Flowering Life Replacing The Ruins (Romok helyen viragzo elet) 1949
- They Need Peace (Nekik béke kell), 1952 - Winner of the 1954 Children's Film Festival, Paris, France
- Matyasföld, (Matyásföld), 1953
- Before the Decision (Választas elött...) 1953
- Budapest, 1953
- In the Land of 'Matyo', 1953
- Budapest Industrial Expo (Budapesti Helyipari Vásár), 1955
- A Journey In Szabolcs (Utazás Szabolcsban), 1955
- Birthday (Születésnap), 1955
- On The Embankment Of The Sajo River (Sajoparti Történet), 1955
- Six Boys, Six Buses (Hat fiu, hat busz), 1956
- Change of Programme (Müsorváltozás), 1957
- Ez It Happened (Így törtent), 1957
- Talking Fruits (Beszélö gyümölcsök), 1957
- Nowhere Else Apart From Here (A nagyvilágon e kivul), 1957
- May I? (Szabad?), 1958
- We Will Meet In Vienna (Bécsben találkozunk), 1959
- The Last Curtain (Az utolso felvonás), 1959
- Bridges, Embankments, People, (Hidak, partok emberek)1960
- History Lesson For Boys (Törtenelmi lecke fiuknak), 1960
- April Greetings (Áprilisi köszöntö),1960
- In the Footsteps Of Childhood (Gyermekévek nyomában) 1961
- Two Harvests in Markaz (Két szuret Markazon) 1961
- Off To Baghdad (Irány Bagdad), 1961
- Festival In Helsinki (Fesztival Helszinkiben) 1962
- Minutes Observed (Ellesett percek) 1962 - Winner of the 3rd Hungarian Short Film Biennale, Budapest
- The 'Puszta' in Winter (A Puszta télen) 1963
- The Last Stop (Végállomas) 1964
- Thoughts About A Street's Name (Gondolatok egy utca névhez) 1964
- Seasons, Masters, Artworks (Evszakok, mesterek, muvek) 1964
- Five Times a Week (Hetenkent ötször) 1965 - 1st Prize of Silver Javelin OTSH Film Festival, Budapest, 1965 ,1st Prize of the Italian Film Production Companies, Cortina d'Ampezzo, 1966, CIDALC Award, Grenoble, 1968
- Chanson (Sanzon) 1966
- Red Signs On The Path of War (Vörös jelek a hadak utján) 1966 - Russian Historical State Award
- This Is As Well Budapest (Ez is Budapest) 1967
- Ode (Oda) 1967
- To My Soldier Son (Katonafiamnak) 1968 - 1st prize of the Veszprem Army Film Festival, Hungary
- Madonnas (Madonnak) 1968
- …And There Will Be A Millions Of Us (Es million leszunk) 1968
- 5 x 1 (5x1), 1969 - Winner of OTSH Film Art Festival, Silver Javelin Prize, 1970, Budapest, Hungary
- The Train (A Vonat), 1970
- Variations On a Theme (Valtozatok egy temara), 1970
- On The Conveyer-belt of History (A tortenelem futoszallagan), 1970
- Self-portrait (Onarckep), 1971
- Two Cities, One Day (Ket varos, egy nap), 1972
- With Abandon, (Onfeledten), 1972
- Two Towns, (Két város), 1972
- Red Gold (Piros Arany), 1973
- My World (Az en vilagom), 1973
- Sparkles (Csillagszorok), 1973
- Those Who Are Waited For (Akiket varnak), 1973
- A Week On A Mountain (Egy hét egy hegyen), 1973
- Sport, Rhythm, Music (Sport, ritmus, zene), 1974
- Together Again (Ismet egyutt), 1974
- Eroica, 1975 - Golden Prize of the Moscow Film Festival 1975, Distinction at the Tampere Film festival, Finland 1976
- Meeting In Peace (Talakozás békében), 1975
- White Acacia (Fehér akác), 1976
- Let Them Have Reverence (Adassék neki tisztelet), 1976
- Thank You For The Clay (Köszönöm az anyagot), 1976
- Good Morning Siberia! (Jo reggelt Sziberia!) - The Prize of the City of Leipzig, Germany
- In Several Voices (Több szolamban), 1977
- The Continuation of A Film (Egy film folytatása), 1978
- Nursery Olympics (Óvis Olympia), 1979 - Award of the International Youth Committee, 1980, Award of the International Olympic Committee 1980, Award of the Russian Olympic Committee, 1980, Silver Javelin Prize, 1980, Budapest, Hungary
- The Survivals (A tulélök), 1980
- Thank You, We Are Well… (Koszonjuk, jol vagyunk...), 1981
- Greeting Life (Eletköszöntö), 1982
- House of Lace ( A csipkeház), 1982
- Painting With Background (Festmény háttérrel), 1983
- A Nuclear Power Station (Atomeromu), 1983
- Goose Empire (Libabirodalom), 1983
- The Daughters of Laos (Laosz lányai), 1984
- The Fourth Meeting (Negyedik találkozás), 1985
- The City Of The Golden Budda (Az arany Buddha városa), 1985
- The Fourth Meeting (A negyedik talákozás), 1985
- You Do Love Horses, Don't You? (A lovakat szeretik, ugye?), 1988 - Award of Montecatini, Special Prize of the Festival Of Tourism, Special Prize at the Hungarian Sport Film Festival, Budapest

== Notes ==
- Kolonits, Margit, 'My Memoirs' ('Visszaemlékezéseim' ) (10 August 1976, Budapest)
- Csőke, József, 'Kolonits Ilona (1922–2002)', Krónika, Filmvilág folyóirat 3 September 2002 old.
- Elena Kaplinskaya 'Illuzion', Profizdat 1991
- Lóránt, Stőhr, 'Nothing is Set in Stone - Conversation with Éva Kármentő' (Semmi sincs kőbe vésve - Beszélgetés Kármentő Évával)

== Bibliography ==
- The British Film Institute, Archives
- Csőke, József, 'Kolonits Ilona (1922–2002)', Krónika, Filmvilág folyóirat 3 September 2002 old.
- Dr. Garai, Erzsébet, 'My Memoirs' ('Visszaemlékezéseim' ) (2003, Budapest)
- Dr. Erzsébet Garai
- Kolonits, Margit (Vámos Ferencné), 'My Memoirs' ('Visszaemlékezéseim' ) (10 August 1976, Budapest), manuscript, in private collection, Budapest
- Kaplinskaya, Elena 'TIlluzion', Profizdat 1991 pp. 124–140
- 'Ilona Kolonits Passed Away' (Elhunyt Kolonits Ilona) (11 July 2002, MTI, (www.filmkultura.hu)
- Lóránt, Stőhr, 'Nothing is Set in Stone - Conversation with Éva Kármentő' (Semmi sincs kőbe vésve - Beszélgetés Kármentő Évával)
- Yad Vashem, Archives
- Conversation with Éva Kármentő
- hu:Kolonits Ilona#Filmjei
- Ilona Kolonits "Thank You For The Clay" (Köszöntöm az agyagot) − fragment
- IMDb
