= Gábor Vajna =

Hungarian politician (1891–1946)

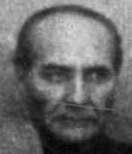

Minister of the Interior
- In office 16 October 1944 – 28 March 1945
- Prime Minister: Ferenc Szálasi
- Preceded by: Péter Schell
- Succeeded by: Ferenc Erdei

Personal details
- Born: 4 November 1891 Kézdivásárhely, Kingdom of Hungary, Austria-Hungary (now Târgu Secuiesc, Romania)
- Died: 12 March 1946 (aged 54) Budapest, Hungary
- Cause of death: Execution by hanging
- Party: Arrow Cross Party
- Profession: politician

Gábor Vajna (4 November 1891 – 12 March 1946) was a Hungarian politician, who served as Minister of the Interior from 1944 to 1945.

== Early life ==
Vajna was born into a Transylvanian Calvinist family in Kézdivásárhely (today Târgu Secuiesc, Romania); then part of the Kingdom of Hungary on 4 November 1891. He participated in World War I, as an officer in the 29th Feldjäger Battalion of the Austro-Hungarian Army, and received many honors during his forty-three months of military service. Following the war, Vajna took service in the Hungarian Embassy at Vienna, and later worked for the Ministry of Defence. He retired from the Royal Hungarian Army as a Major in 1924. After that he was appointed director of the gunpowder factory in Balatonfűzfő. When his far-right sympathy was revealed, Vajna was dismissed from that position.

== Political career ==
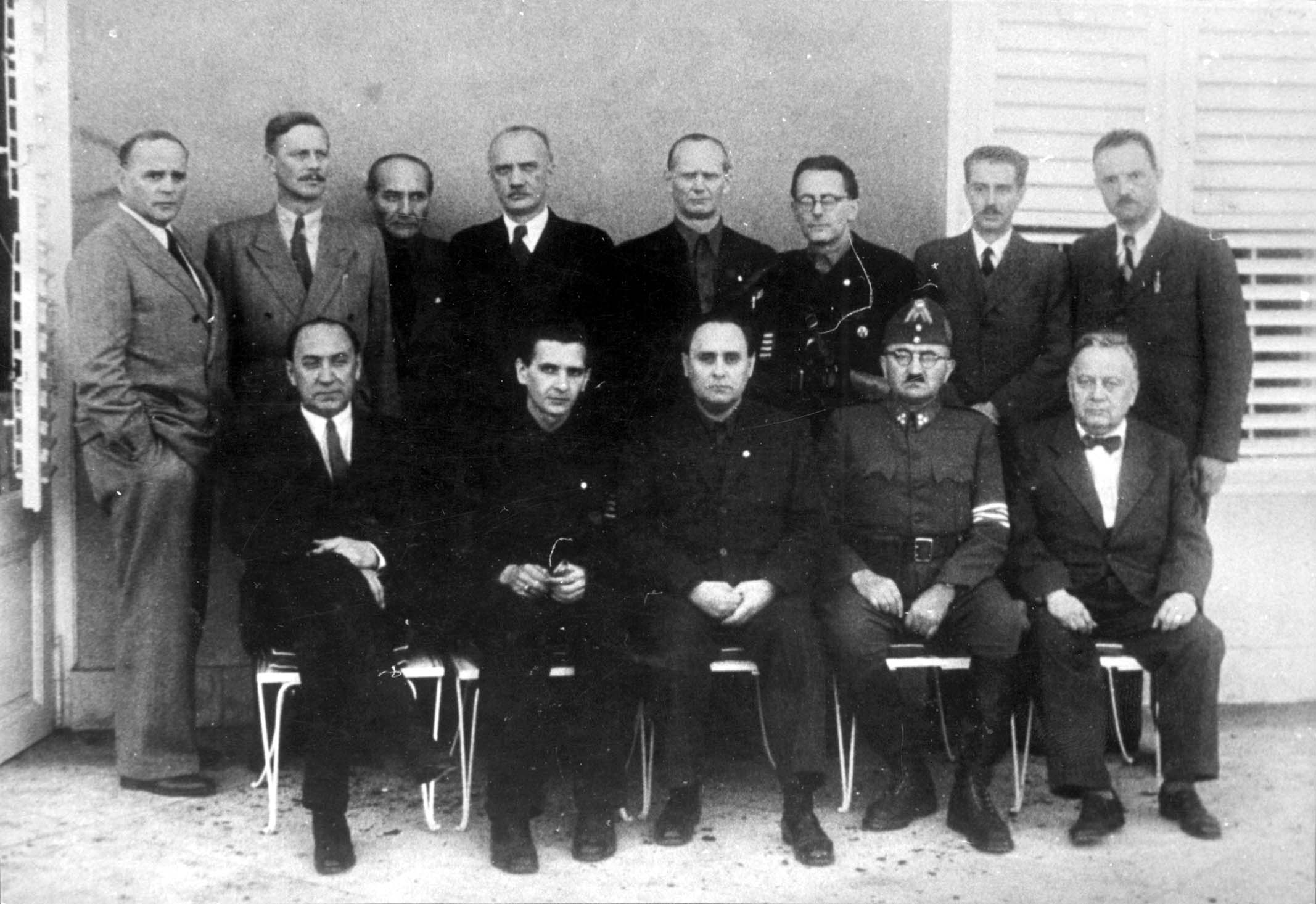
Ministers of the Arrow Cross Party government. Gábor Vajna is in the third from left of the upper row.

Vajna was a confidant of Prime Minister Ferenc Szálasi, the Hungarian fascist party leader and founder of the extreme right "Party of National Will", which later became the Arrow Cross Party. Vajna was elected Member of Parliament from the regional list of Veszprém County during the 1939 parliamentary election. After the German occupation of Hungary in March 1944, he maintained a good relationship between the Hungarian authorities and the arriving Gestapo and Schutzstaffel officials. He helped to overcoming the resistance fighters and prevent sabotage activities. Following the Arrow Cross Party's coup, Vajna took office as Interior Minister in October 1944 and served until March 1945.

While responsible for internal affairs, Vajna took a number of actions against Hungarian Jews. In cooperation with requests from German officials such as SS officer Edmund Veesenmayer, Vajna moved quickly to deport Jews in areas under Hungarian control to the Third Reich, where they were used as slaves and many were ultimately killed. As many as 76,000 Jews were delivered into Nazi hands through the end of 1944. During his ministership, the Budapest Ghetto was established on 29 November 1944 which lasted for less than three months.

Following the fall of Budapest, Vajna attempted to escape to Western Europe but was captured by units of the United States Army along with other members of the government. He was later tried in Budapest by a people's tribunal and sentenced to death for war crimes, crimes against humanity and treason. He was hanged in 1946 in Budapest on the same day as Ferenc Szálasi, Károly Beregfy and József Gera.

== Sources ==
- Magyar Életrajzi Lexikon

Political offices
Preceded by Péter Schell	Minister of the Interior; 1944–1945	Succeeded by Ferenc Erdei
