= Miklós Bonczos =

Hungarian politician (1897–1971)

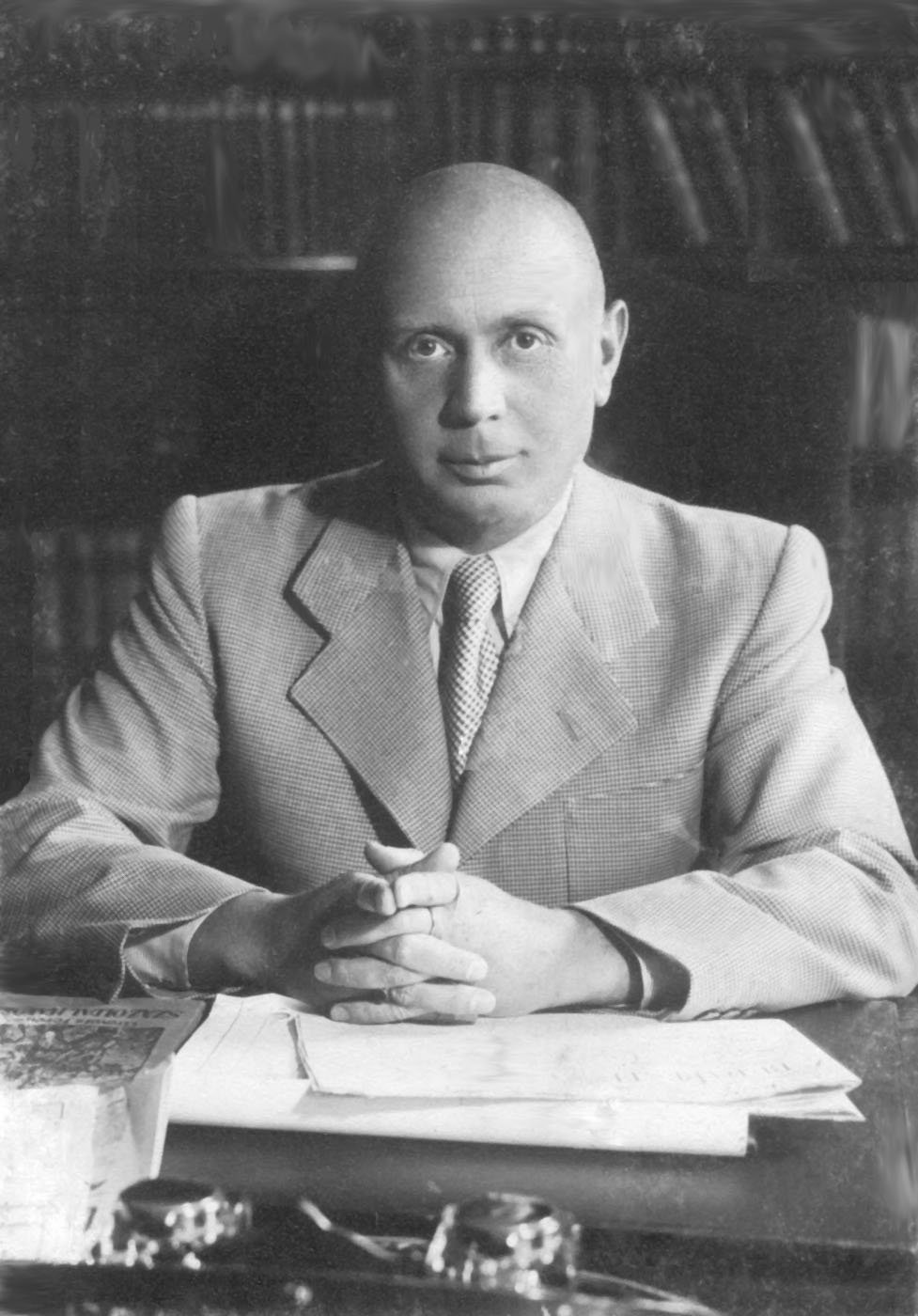
- Milkós c. 1930

Minister of the Interior
- In office 7 August 1944 – 9 September 1944
- Prime Minister: Géza Lakatos
- Preceded by: Andor Jaross
- Succeeded by: Péter Schell

Personal details
- Born: 16 September 1897 Nagyszalonta, Austria-Hungary (today Salonta, Romania)
- Died: 1 August 1971 (aged 73) Buenos Aires, Argentina
- Party: Party of Hungarian Life, Party of National Unity
- Profession: politician

Miklós Bonczos (Nagyszalonta, Hungary 16 September 1897 – Buenos Aires, Argentina 1 August 1971) was a Hungarian politician.

- 1915: Graduated Ludovika military academy in 1915.
- 1919: Awarded the Order of Vitéz for distinguished services in World War I.
- 1925: Graduated Budapest University's Law School.
- 1937: Csongrád county head.
- 1939-1944: Member of the Parliament.
- 17 August 1944 – 9 September 1944: Minister of the Interior for the Géza Lakatos administration. Due to health problems, could not fulfill his duties. Béla Horváth was appointed acting interior minister as state secretary on 9 September.

Bonczos left Hungary before the Soviet troops captured Budapest. He later emigrated to Argentina, where he died.

Political offices
Preceded by Andor Jaross	Minister of the Interior; 1944	Succeeded by Péter Schell
