= Andor Jaross =

Hungarian politician (1896–1946)

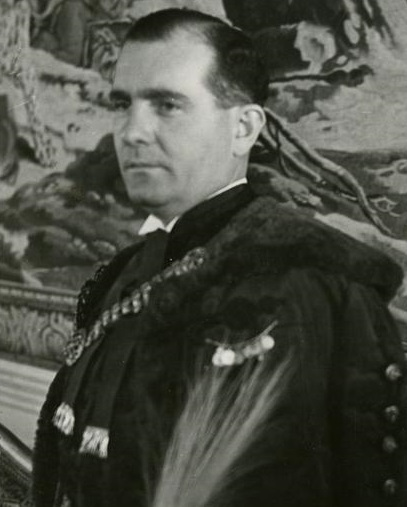
- Jaross in 1938

Minister of the Interior
- In office 22 March 1944 – 7 August 1944
- Prime Minister: Döme Sztójay
- Preceded by: Ferenc Keresztes-Fischer
- Succeeded by: Miklós Bonczos

Personal details
- Born: Andor Jaross; 23 May 1896 Komáromcsehi, Kingdom of Hungary (now Čechy, Slovakia)
- Died: 11 April 1946 (aged 49) Budapest, Hungary
- Cause of death: Execution by firing squad
- Citizenship: Hungarian (1896–1920, 1938–), Czechoslovak (1920–1938)
- Party: United Hungarian Party; Party of Hungarian Renewal; Arrow Cross Party
- Occupation: Politician

Andor Jaross (23 May 1896 – 11 April 1946) was an ethnic Hungarian politician most active in interwar Czechoslovakia and later in Hungary during World War II. He also notably collaborated with the Nazis.

Born in Komáromcsehi, in the Komárom County of the Kingdom of Hungary (present-day Čechy, Slovakia), he became general secretary of the United Hungarian Party, a group that sought to unite parts of Czechoslovakia with Hungary. As national chairman of the party he sought to forge a united Hungarian identity, claiming in his inaugural address that 'every member of the Hungarian minority should take a united stand on the issues of today and tomorrow'. Although effectively subordinate to János Esterházy in the party, Jaross became a well-known international figure, notably accepting an invitation to London from the Hungarian Committee of the House of Commons to present Hungarian grievances along with fellow United Hungarian Party MP Géza Szüllő.

Moving to Hungary in 1938 he joined the government of Béla Imrédy as Minister for Regained Territories and was one of the 18 deputies who formed the Party of Hungarian Renewal in 1940 (a far right dissident group of the governing party). After the Nazi regime occupied Hungary in March 1944 and raised Nazi sympathizer Döme Sztójay to the Prime Minister's post, Jaross was put in charge of the Interior Ministry. From that position, he took charge of the country's Jews and, with his deputies László Endre and László Baky, was responsible for circumventing Miklós Horthy's plans by arranging their deportation. During this time Jaross, Endre and Baky ran the Interior Ministry as a personal fiefdom and used it to eliminate their enemies, whilst also keeping Sztójay at arm's length in favour of German influence. The ghettoes were inspected in August 1944 by Adolf Eichmann and Dieter Wisliceny and, although the Jewish Council sent appeals for better treatment direct to Jaross and Eichmann, the extermination proceeded. A growing figure in Hungarian public life, Jaross even became president of football club Ferencvárosi TC in 1944.

Removed from his position in August 1944 (after appropriating much Jewish property) he made a brief return in October 1944, after the Nazis deposed Horthy and installed the rabidly antisemitic Arrow Cross Party to head the new government under Prime Minister Ferenc Szálasi.

After the war, Jaross was tried by the Hungarian authorities and executed by firing squad.

Government offices
Preceded by Ferenc Keresztes-Fischer	Minister of the Interior; 1944	Succeeded by Miklós Bonczos
