= Farkasréti Cemetery =

Hungarian cemetery in Budapest

Coordinates: 47°29′02″N 19°00′17″E

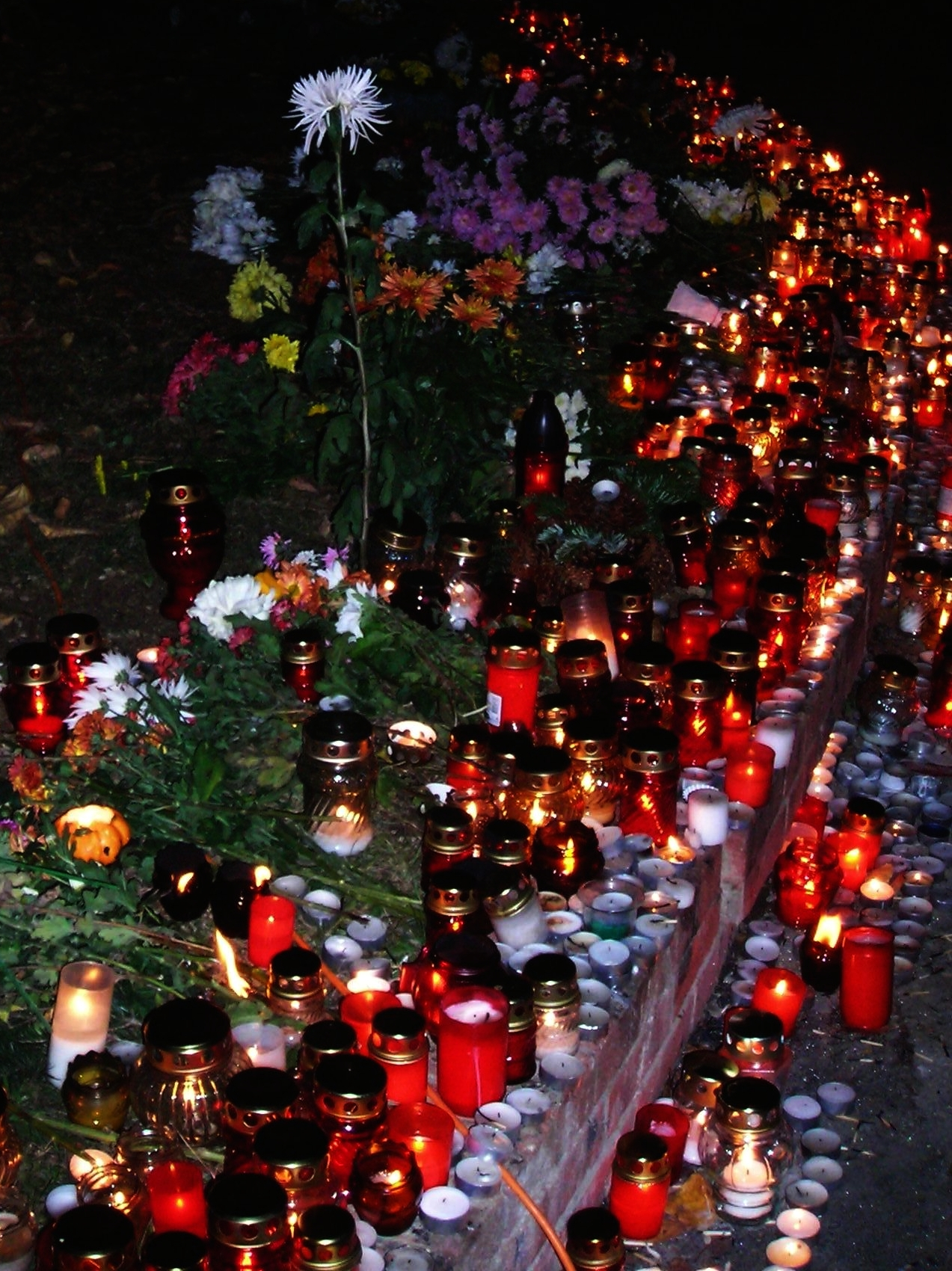
Candles for the dead on the All Souls' Day, Farkasréti Cemetery

Farkasréti Cemetery or Farkasrét Cemetery (Hungarian: Farkasréti temető, Hungarian pronunciation: [ˈfɒrkɒsreːti ˈtɛmɛtøː]) is one of the most famous cemeteries in Budapest. It opened in 1894 and is noted for its extensive views of the city (several people wanted it more to be a resort area than a cemetery).

It comprises tombs of numerous Hungarian notables and it is the most preferred burial place among actors, actresses and other artists (opera singers, musicians, painters, sculptors, architects, writers, poets). The cemetery is also home to the tombs of several scientists, academicians and athletes.

Graves are often decorated with noteworthy sculptures. It was provided with parks in the 1950s, when it took on its present appearance and extent. The mortuary hall and the new chapel were built in the 1980s to the plans of Imre Makovecz.

In the Communist era, funerals were restricted in Kerepesi Cemetery, so it became the main cemetery for those who could not get one.

It is located in Buda (the Western part of Budapest), approximately 3 km away from the downtown.

The oldest grave that is still located in its original place is that of the mechanical engineer Ferenc Cathry Szaléz, the designer of the Rack railway in Budapest and the original Mária Valéria bridge in Esztergom.

== Notable interments ==
- Vilmos Aba Novák, painter
- Karl Aschenbrenner, philosopher
- Péter Bacsó, film director and screenwriter
- Ervin Baktay, orientalist
- Donát Bánki, inventor
- Béla Bartók, composer, the sculpture made by Miklós Borsos
- Pal Benko, chess player and chess composer
- Dénes Berinkey, Prime Minister
- Aurél Bernáth, painter and poet
- Sándor Bíró, footballer
- Miklós Borsos, sculptor
- József Bozsik, footballer, member of the Golden Team
- Károly Bund, forestry engineer and environmentalist
- Csinszka, Endre Ady's wife
- Tamás Cseh, singer and songwriter
- Zsuzsa Cserháti, singer
- János Csonka, inventor
- Béla Czóbel, painter
- Ferenc Deák, footballer
- József C. Dobos, inventor of the Dobos Cake, a Hungarian speciality
- Béla Egresi, footballer
- István Eiben, cinematographer
- Pál Engel, historian
- Zoltán Fábri, director
- Sári Fedák, actress
- István Fekete, writer
- János Ferencsik, conductor
- Noel Field, communist agent and hidden victim of show trials
- Annie Fischer, pianist
- Miklós Gábor, actor
- Aladár Gerevich, seven-times Olympic champion fencer
- Gyula Germanus, orientalist
- Ernő Gerő, communist politician
- Hilda Gobbi, actress
- Lisl Goldarbeiter, model
- András Hegedűs, Socialist Prime Minister
- Laszlo Heltay, choral trainer
- Géza Hofi, comedian
- Béla Horváth, Secretary of State for the Interior in Lakatos cabinet
- Éva Janikovszky, writer of children's books
- Pál Jávor, actor
- Gyula Kabos, actor
- Katalin Karády, actress, singer
- György Kárpáti, three-times Olympic champion water polo player
- Lajos Kassák, poet and painter
- Manyi Kiss, actress
- Károly Kernstok, painter
- Kálmán Kittenberger, Africa researcher, naturalist
- Zoltán Kocsis, pianist
- Zoltán Kodály, composer, the sculpture made by Pál Pátzai
- János Kodolányi, writer
- György Kolonics, Olympic champion sprint canoeist
- Ilona Kolonits, documentary film director, war correspondent
- Béla Kondor, painter
- János Koós, dance singer, parodist, actor
- Margit Kovács, ceramicist and sculptor
- László Lajtha, composer
- Kálmán Latabár, actor
- Imre Makovecz, architect
- György Marx, physicist
- Istvan Medgyaszay, architect
- Ágnes Nemes Nagy, poet
- László Németh, writer
- István Örkény, writer
- László Papp, three-times Olympic champion boxer
- János Pilinszky, poet
- Mátyás Rákosi, Communist leader; now only his initials are visible to avoid vandalism
- Éva Ruttkai, actress
- Ferenc Sánta, writer
- Zoltán Ozoray Schenker, Olympic fencing champion
- Sándor Simonyi-Semadam, Prime Minister
- Gábor Szabó, jazz guitarist
- Árpád Szakasits, Socialist leader
- Pál Szécsi, singer
- Árpád Székely, painter, artist
- Georg Solti, conductor
- Zoltán Tildy, President
- Amerigo Tot (born Imre Tóth), sculptor and actor
- László Verebélÿ, electrical engineer
- Béla Volentik, footballer
- Sándor Weöres, poet
- József Zakariás, footballer, member of the Golden Team

== See also ==
- Kerepesi Cemetery

== Resources ==
- (in Hungarian) mult-kor.hu
