= Péter Schell =

Hungarian politician

Minister of the Interior of Hungary
- In office 12 October 1944 – 16 October 1944
- Prime Minister: Géza Lakatos
- Preceded by: Miklós Bonczos
- Succeeded by: Gábor Vajna

Personal details
- Born: 5 September 1898 Nagyida, Austria-Hungary (today Veľká Ida, Slovakia)
- Died: 2 March 1974 (aged 75) Montclair, United States
- Party: Party of National Unity
- Profession: politician

Baron Péter Schell de Bauschlott (5 September 1898 – 2 March 1974) was a Hungarian politician, who served as Interior Minister in 1944. After the Arrow Cross Party's coup he was transported to Buchenwald by the Gestapo. In late April 1945 he was transferred to Tyrol together with about 140 other prominent inmates, where the SS left the prisoners behind. He was liberated by the Fifth U.S. Army on 5 May 1945.

After his liberation he emigrated to the United States.

Political offices
| Preceded by Miklós Bonczos | Minister of the Interior; 1944 | Succeeded by Gábor Vajna |
