= Gyula Germanus =

Hungarian writer, Islamologist, and politician

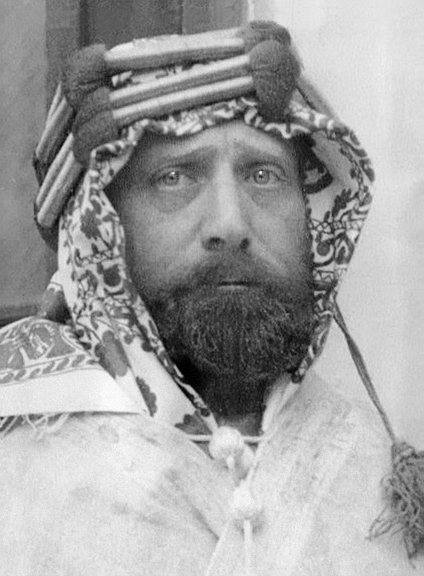
- Germanus in the 1930s
- Born: Julius Germanus; 6 November 1884; Budapest, Hungary
- Died: 7 November 1979 (aged 95); Budapest, Hungary
- Resting place: Budapest, Farkasréti cemetery
- Education: University of Istanbul
- Known for: Academic
- Spouse: Rózsa Hajnóczy

Gyula Germanus (6 November 1884, in Budapest – 7 November 1979, in Budapest), alias Julius Abdulkerim Germanus, was a Hungarian professor of oriental studies, writer and Islamologist, member of the Hungarian Parliament and member of multiple Arabic academies of science, who made significant contributions to the study of the Arabic language, history of language and cultural history. He was a follower of the famous orientalist, Sir Ármin Vámbéry and became a scholar of world repute.

Germanus was a language professor at the Hungarian Royal Eastern Academy from 1912, and a teacher of Turkish and Arabic from 1915. During World War I he made several secret missions to Turkey. In 1915 he was there as member of the Turkish Red Crescent and also joined the battle at the Dardanelles.

== Youth and studies ==
Julius Germanus was born in Budapest on 6 November 1884 into a middle-class family. Both of his grandfathers were soldiers in the Hungarian Revolution of 1848–49. His father, Alexander Germanus (1852–1940), was a leather merchant and shoemaker of Jewish descent; his mother, Rosalia Zobel, was of Zipser German origin. Julius had a brother, Francis and a sister, Johanna.

Young Julius did not do well in the early years of high school and sometimes got very low marks. Despite that he graduated with brilliant results in 1902. His mother spoke German more than Hungarian. Despite this, Hungarian became his mother tongue. Maybe this confusion led him to studying languages, and accompanied with his great strength of mind, to multilingualism as well: just after finishing high school he sat for exams in Greek and Latin, both widespread in the intellectual class in the region, at that time. Beside reading classical and foreign languages and writing books on history, literature and the history of music became his other spare time activities. Germanus devoured historical books in the original French and German. His own first work entitled, The Artillery Lieutenant (A tüzérhadnagy), which discussed the 1870–1871 siege of Strasbourg, carried off the first prize of 20 Hungarian Crowns.

From early childhood he played the violin diligently, but at the same time he felt an irresistible attraction to the piano. His parents could not afford to acquire even a pianino, and of course they didn't want to see their son wasting his time with another hobby instead of improving as a musician. Julius adapted himself to the situation and began to practice in secrecy on a keyboard made of straw-board. He was not very talented in music, but the great effort had its effect, and at 13 with his sister, he interpreted some pieces of Bach and Mozart.

The young Germanus loved nature and, while staying in the country, couldn't help going into the stable to pat the horses. "Once, out on the pasture, [a farm worker] sat me on the back of a steer at my request. I was only five and scarcely weighed anything. My mother caught her breath and turned pale when she saw the herd of cattle coming into the village with the bull at its head and me sitting on the bull."

== Following a great predecessor ==
As an adult Germanus' interest turned to history, and the arts and literature of the East. His first deep impression of the East came from reading a German paper called Gartenlaube. There was a wood-print with a magical view of an unreachable eastern town. "The picture presented small, flat-roofed houses rising among them, here and there, some dome shaped cupola. The light of the half-moon, twinkling in the dark sky, lengthened the shadows of the figures squatting on the roofs". This was the moment when his affection for the East was born.

Soon after this, Julius started to learn the Turkish language himself, without any help. As he wrote in his great work, Allah Akbar, languages had been the medium of transmission of eastern culture, art and literature, so he acquired several languages—not just out of affection for foreign tongues—he was seeking the Muslim mind, the "soul of the East". How Turkish writers of history viewed the Turkish dominance over Hungary, interested him from the beginning. But he soon found that many sources could not be used without knowing Persian and Arabic. He decided to be master of both, but had difficulties with Persian.

One of the best acknowledged orientalists and linguists of that time, Sir Ármin Vámbéry came to his aid. "Several periodicals, like Mesveret and some other shorter or longer reviews of similar subjects, with complimentary copies of books, were arriving for Vámbery in Pest. Those in which the Professor wasn't interested were thrown into a bathtub for me, from where I could fish out the papers and books that I preferred". Father Alexander Germanus frowned on his sons dreaming; he was worried that Julius might get into evil ways. But Vámbéry stood up for his beloved acolyte. "Mr Germanus, your son shows great promise. Don't obstruct his career; let him study. Don't consider his need for books as foolishness! Please, help him; I warrant that you won't be disappointed".

== Bosnia, his first journey ==
Having graduated from high school, Germanus decided to spend time in Bosnia, the nearest Islamic country to Hungary. This was his first encounter with Muslims. The visit to Bosnia reinforced his decision to pursue oriental studies.

His parents preferred him to become an engineer. But after coming home, Germanus enrolled at the University of Sciences in Budapest to read Latin and History. Among his professors were Ignác Goldziher, considered one of the founders of modern Islamic studies; Bálint Kuzsinszky, professor of Ancient History; Ignác Kúnos, an authority on Turkish languages; István Hegedűs, professor of Greek and Henrik Marczali, lecturer in Hungarian History.

"Germanus was always speaking about Goldziher with the deepest fondness and respect. It was however Vámbery who stood much nearer to him personally. Germanus considered him as a real mentor and supporter". In 1903, through the Eastern Academy, he won a scholarship to better his knowledge of Turkey in Constantinople. He stayed with an Armenian family and read law at the University of Constantinople.

== The Young Turks ==
While staying in the Ottoman Empire, Julius Germanus got involved in the Young Turks movement, a coalition of various groups favouring reforms in national administration. The movement intended to overthrow the monarchy of Ottoman Sultan Abdul Hamid II. Because of his involvement, Germanus was accused of espionage and imprisoned. After a trial he was condemned to death by the regime. Just at the last moment, the Austrian consul took him off the gallows and got him out of the jailhouse.

After the incident Germanus cut himself adrift from the movement, and started a journey to roam the Empire. What he saw and felt on his trip, fulfilled the dreams of his youth. After he got back home, his first scientific work was published in 1905, in a publication of his Turkish teacher, Ignác Kúnos, under the chapter "Arabic and Persian Elements in Turkish". His path led him not only towards East; he was also attending lectures balkanology, archeology and German literature in Leipzig and Vienna.

== Doctor of Philosophy ==
In 1906 his study titled Geschichte der Osmanischen Dichtkunst (The History of Ottoman Poetry) was published. In 1907 he obtained his degree as Doctor of Philosophy, summa cum laude, in Turkish and Arabic language and literature, literature and world history.

With his work Evlija Cselebi, about Turkish trade guilds in the 18th century, Germanus obtained a scholarship to Great Britain, where he spent three years between 1908 and 1911 in the Oriental Department of the British Museum. The recommendatory letter from his teacher, Ármin Vámbery, the greatest expert on Islamic studies at that time, benefited him greatly. His skill in the English language was helpful, not only for his work and study, but he edited English course books and dictionaries too.

Germanus was fencing and swimming competitively from childhood. In England he tried boxing as well, but his favourite sport was riding. He won prizes at it. It was in England, too, where he first found love. His relationship to his beloved Gwendolyn Percyfull remained long-lasting, even though after a few years not in a romantic form. They were exchanging letters more than 50 years later.

== In Turkey after the Revolution of the Young Turks ==
During the war years, between 1914 and 1919 he obtained a position in the Prime Ministers Office to monitor the foreign press. As soon as the war started, Germanus had to use his extraordinary knowledge of languages in secret missions in Turkey, then allied with Hungary. He had to escort special ambassadorial carriages, as a deputy of the Hungarian department of the Red Crescent. He was doing this, in July 1915, when a train to Anatolia was found to contain weapons and explosives hidden among medicines and bandages.

At that time the Sultanate was already over, and a parliamentary state had been established. However, conflicts among the minorities of this multinational country were inflamed, and there were power struggles. Seeing the government debt, the war casualties and consequent enormous levels of poverty, filled his heart with sorrow. Germanus was deeply disappointed in the men he had known in his scholarship years spent in Constantinople. They now filled high positions in the state, and played a determining role in the Armenian Genocide, among other things.

=== Recognition and illness ===
Germanus served with the Red Crescent, in the Gallipoli campaign in the Dardanelles, where he was wounded and taken prisoner. After his release he became acquainted with the commander of the 19th Division, attached to the Fifth Army, Mustafa Kemal Pasha, who later, known as Atatürk, founded the Republic of Turkey in 1923.

In Turkey, Germanus contacted the Sultan. (1909–18) in 1915, and the heir of the throne Abdul Medsid. (1918–22) in 1918. Germanus was given a 'Mecidiye order' from the first and an 'Osmanie order' from the later. During that sojourn in Turkey he became sick with malaria. His illness was detected much later, which led to a prolonged recovery of more than two years. In the same year, 1918, he married Rózsa Hajnóczy (1892–1944) from Upper Hungary. She was his faithful and fond partner during the Indian years.

=== Textbook published ===
His book on the Turkish language was published in 1925. Hungarian readers welcomed it with great interest. He became the secretary of the Hungarian PEN Club, on the recommendation of John Galsworthy, the English novelist and playwright. Germanus was one of the individuals that inspired the organization of the Bulgarian PEN Club in the fall of 1926 (on this way to Turkey), and the Egyptian PEN Club in 1936.

=== A record of change ===
Germanus saw how the dreams of his youth, about positive changes in Turkey, had gone sour as the years passed. Getting out of financial crisis and poverty, this former country of sultans was faced with increasing Europeanization, leading to the loss of the ancient national dress. At the same time, the intrusive power of capital, and the rush to westernization, was destroying the Eastern soul and mentality. Wherever he looked, he could see only European traditions: western clothes, the Latin alphabet in recently published books, and mechanization. The former bazaars and lifestyle, the eastern feeling and mindset, that was all in the past now.

The era between the two World Wars brought raging change to the young Republic of Turkey. Events spurred him to write two works. Germanus wrote two essays about the Turkish cultural transformation in French: La civilisation turque moderne ("The modern Turkish Civilisation") and Pensées sur la révolution turque ("Thinking about the Turkish Revolution", about the role of Kemal Atatürk in the revolution).

As a result, the new Turkish government invited him to Turkey in 1928. Travelling there he could see the transformation of Muslim Turkey into a new European country. He was disappointed, stopped the trip, and visited Bulgaria, Macedonia, Sofia and Belgrade instead. Here he met Nikola Vaptsarov and other national leaders and writers.

== India ==
His knowledge of the history, cultural history, politics and literature of the Muslim world, gave Germanus an unusual opportunity. In 1928 Rabindranath Tagore invited him to India to organize, and then lead as first professor, the Department of the History of Islam (now the Department of Arabic, Persian, Urdu and Islamic Studies) at his university Visva-Bharati University in Santiniketan.

Germanus gave lectures in Lucknow, Lahore and Dhaka. In December 1930 he was invited to Delhi. He met Dr. Zakir Husain, later the third President of Republic of India, and Sarvepalli Radhakrishnan, later the first Vice President and the second President of the Republic of India. He spent three years in Bengal, with his wife Hajnóczy Rózsa, and taught an always a growing group of Islamic pupils under an open sky.

In parallel, he dedicated much time to improving himself, for example he began to study Sanskrit, and to work on other smaller projects. During these years Pál Teleki, the Hungarian Prime Minister, asked him to study the Maori and Munda languages from a linguistic point of view.

He and his wife spent the muggy Indian summers traveling. They visited the tomb of Sándor Kőrösi Csoma, the famous Hungarian orientalist, in Darjeeling. They traveled through Kashmir.

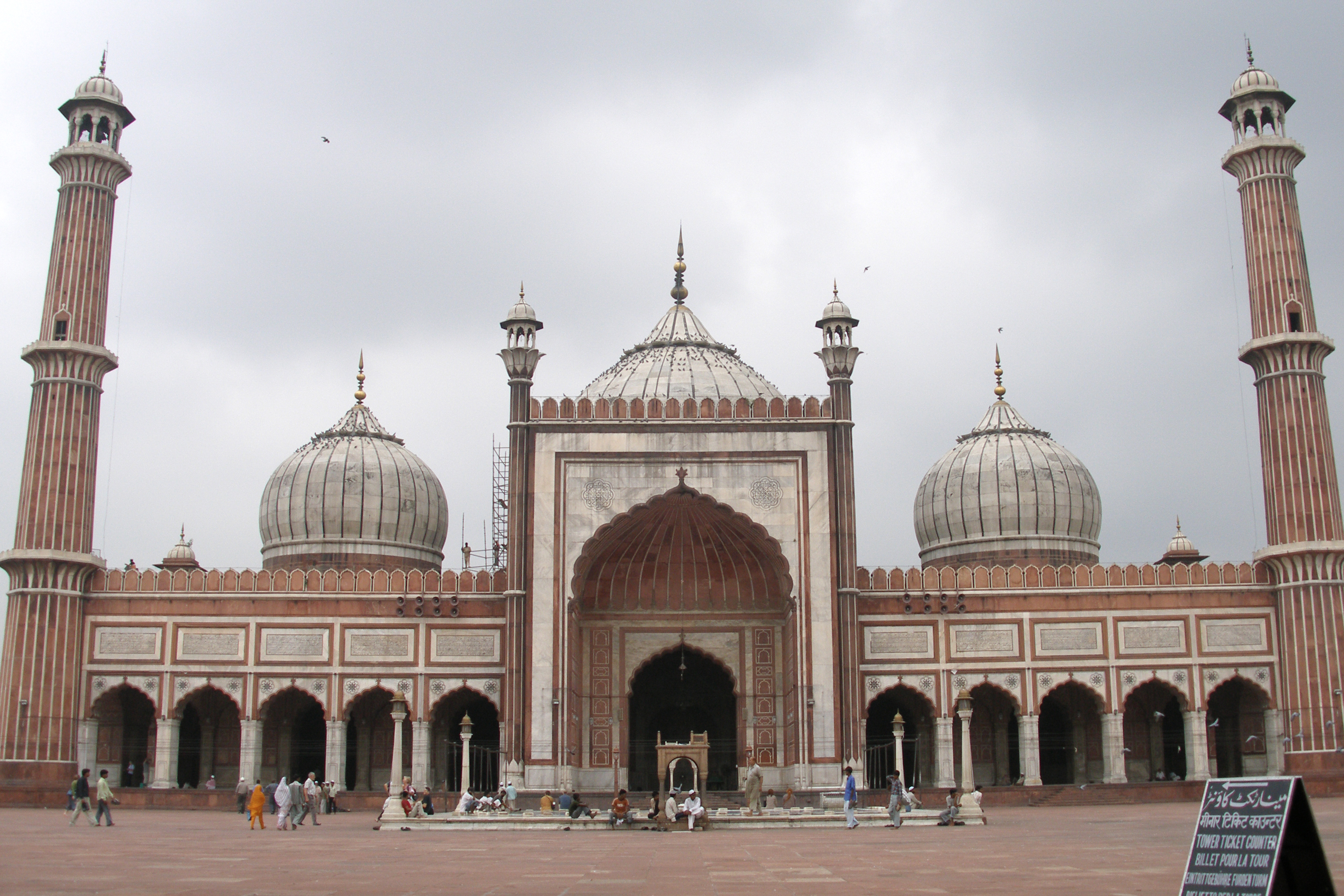
Jama Masjid in Delhi from 1656

In December 1930 he was welcomed in Delhi to work at the Aligarh Muslim University, where he became acquainted with Zakir Hussain, President of the University (the third President of India in 1967), and with Sarvepalli Radhakrishnan (the second President of India in 1962).

This period of his life was enormously rich in experience and the development of his notions and emotions on being Muslim. He increased his knowledge of Islamic culture and history. By this time he was living the Qur'an and took part in the Friday prayers in Jama Masjid, Delhi. Once he gave a speech to 5,000 people about the new blossoming of Islam. It was so popular that he had to escape from the thankful listeners, and possible death from the crush.

News of Germanus' speech spread round the Muslim world. Leading articles were published in newspapers about him and hundreds of believers went on pilgrimage to his humble flat to get advice. The proceedings made a great impression on him. He chose a Muslim name, Abdul-Karim ("servant of the gracious God").

== Middle East ==
In 1934, with financial support from the state, Germanus travelled through the Middle East, Egypt and Saudi Arabia. Travelling through England, he met T. E. Lawrence. After landing in Cairo, he had difficulty entering Al-Azhar University. He was supported by his Egyptian writer friends, who mellowed the rigour of grand sheik Muhammad al-Ahmadi al-Zawahiri, the uncompromising head of the University, who had not wanted Europeans to enter his Institute.

Eventually, Germanus was allowed to be student for some months, and then to be a member of the teaching staff of the thousand year old mosque-university in the heart of Cairo.

=== Mecca and the Hajj ===
Leaving Egypt Germanus took ship to Saudi Arabia, to stay first in Jeddah and then in Mecca. In 1935 he was the first Hungarian Muslim to perform the Hajj in Mecca. He travelled incognito through the hidden territories of the Arabian Peninsula. It was not without danger, even though he had been living according to Qur'anic law.

Germanus was also hiding his favourite Hungarian flag under his ihram clothing, and a pocket camera—most unusual in that era. Together with photos, he wrote descriptions of wall inscriptions and documents, never before seen in Western Europe. He was even able to investigate the Black Stone, since he was once a leading student of Geology. Germanus considered a great honour when he was invited to the royal tent of King Abdul Aziz ibn Saud during the Hajj.

=== A book about the Holy Land ===
A book about his journeys in the Holy Land came out one year later (1936), first in Hungarian, and after a great success it was translated into German (Allah Akbar. Im Banne des Islams) and Italian (Sulle orme di Maometto).

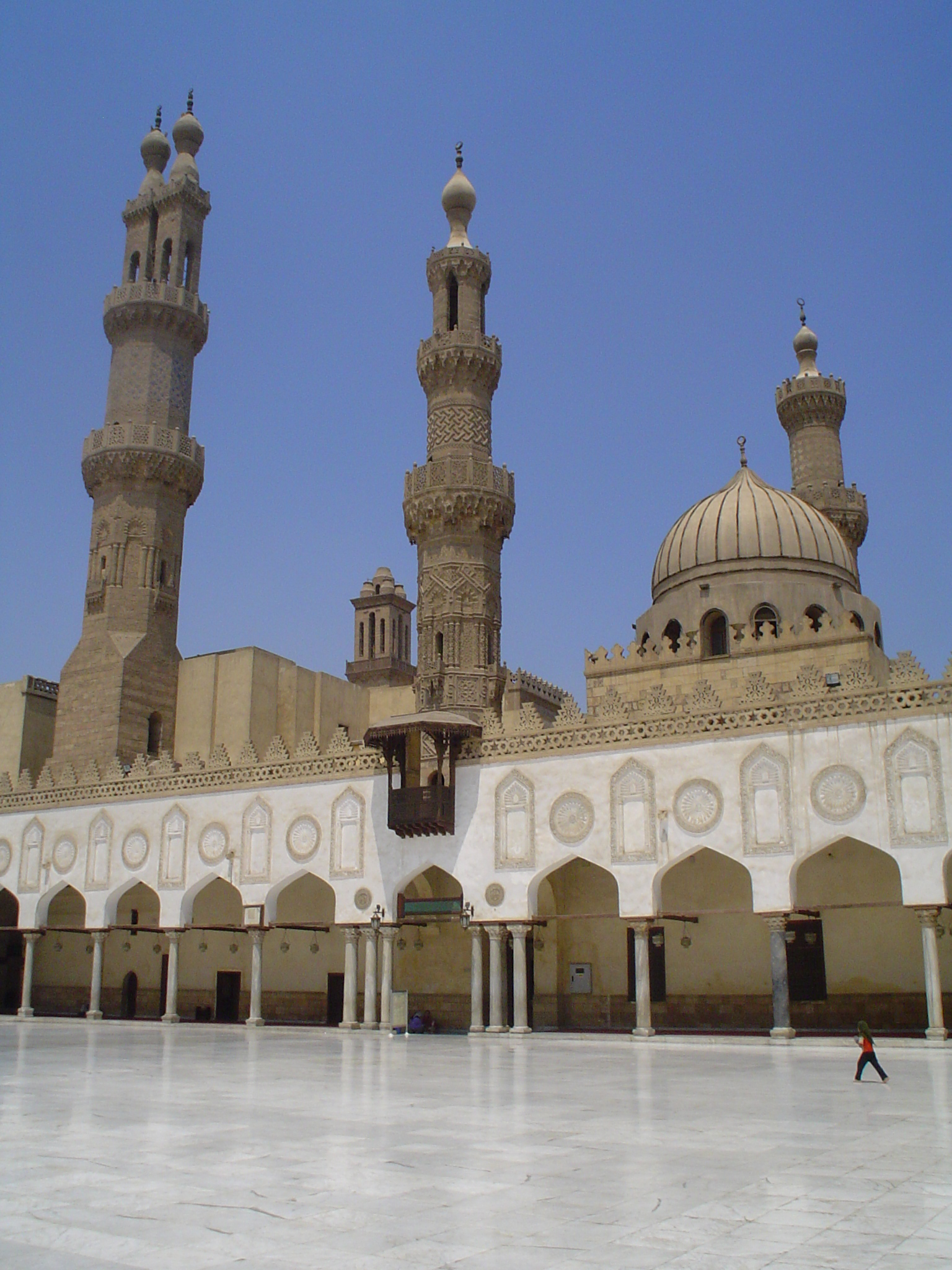
Al-Azhar University, founded in 972

Having fulfilled the annual pilgrimage, the Hungarian Hajji went to Medina to visit the tomb of the Prophet. A two-week journey with a caravan under the scorching sun, and the unbearable heat, wore out his health and he succumbed to fever. He had to give up his scientific research work and to return to Europe. He spent several days in Athens recovering from the illness.

Since had to leave Medina so suddenly, forced by illness, Germanus considered his work incomplete. He thought that only he would enter the holy territories of Arabia to finish further studies. Anyway, the return seemed even more circumstantial because of the wartime and Hungary's clogging diplomacy. Finally on 23 September 1939, he embarked on the 'Kassa', later changing to the 'Duna'. after the shipwreck of the former, and went through the Bosphorus to Alexandria, as a crew member.

=== Mishap at sea ===
At this time he completed his 55th year; he wrote about himself: "I'm the oldest sailor in the world". That was not enough; he was awarded a high honor, because, with his fellow sailors, he succeeded in saving the ship from sinking in a terrible storm.

In Egypt Germanus visited his writer and scholar friends again. After some weeks he went to explore all over Lebanon, and Saudi Arabia. In Mecca, Medina and in the city of Badr he completed the research work and also his second Hajj.

=== Journey through the desert ===
In the course of his journeys he was the first European to pass through the Wadi Djadak and Ghureir. On the testing 28-day trip the caravan ran out of food and water. They had to eat the camels. After three days without water Germanus lost consciousness. His companions thought that his life was already beyond hope, but his faithful Arab friend was intractable and did not allow the others to leave the European traveller in the desert, or to kill his camel.

Arriving at the Oasis of Hamellie, Germanus came to his senses after five days of unconsciousness. The caravan arrived in Riyadh where King Abdul Aziz ibn Saud received the Hungarian scholar.

== During World War II ==
In 1941 he became the director of the Eastern Institute. During World War II he was on the streets of Budapest to help family, friends and the university, to hide people and secure them, and to save lives and goods. His library remained miraculously unharmed. His wife, Rozsa Hajnoczy suffered from the attacks, so he decided to find a calm place in a village for her. By the time he returned to Budapest she had committed suicide. She could not live with the thought that her husband's life was in continuous danger under the Nyilas regime. One person helped him through these days. He had met Kajari Kato, at an exhibition in 1939. He found a good student, a helpful colleague and a good wife in her.

== A new life ==
In 1948 he became director of the professorship of Italian culture and economical policy. His works were published in Italian: the book "Sulle orme di Maometto", 1938, Milan, and the translation of "Allah Akbar". The Eastern Institute closed and the teachers were dismissed, with no hope of revival.

He worked at the Turkish philologic professorship in the Péter Pázmány University, Eötvös Loránd University from November 1949, under the leadership of Gyula Németh. In 1955 he succeeded Németh.

During these years he prepared a work about the life and legacy of Arabic poet Ibn al-Rumi.

From 1958 to 1966, he was a member of parliament in Hungary. He was a university delegate and did not join the Party. He continued working at the professorship of Arabic literature and cultural history as a lecturer. Later he became the senior lecturer. He was released from duty only in 1964, at the age of 80.

== Return to the East ==
Between 1955 and 1965 he traveled again, at the age of 71, accompanied by his wife and follower, Kato Kajari. His book Eastern Lights is about these experiences. He accepted invitations from the Scientific Academy of Cairo, other universities in Alexandria, Cairo, Damascus, and eight Indian universities to give lectures about Islamic cultural history in English and Arabic.

On 30 December 1957, he gave an inaugural speech at the Academy of Sciences in Cairo. His Egyptian colleagues organized a special 'Germanus lecture-week' in his honor. He also visited Dina bint 'Abdu'l-Hamid, Queen of Jordan, and Talal ibn Abd al-Aziz, Prince of Saud.

=== India ===
He revisited Indian cities to refresh his memories of Bombay, Delhi, Aligarh, Patna, Agra, Hyderabad, Calcutta, Lucknow and Santiniketan. Jawaharlal Nehru, the prime minister of India invited him to visit. Here he witnessed the development and rapid change of Muslim societies.

In February 1961 he gave lectures in Morocco, at the universities of Fez, Rabat, Casablanca. He kept his inauguration at the Academy of Baghdad in 1962. The topic was the history of Islam in Hungary. He was also invited to the 'Festival for the 1200th anniversary of the foundation of Baghdad'.

In February 1964, the government of the United Arabic Republic (the union of Egypt and Syria) asked him to give lectures in the refurbished school of the Al-Azhar Mosque, on the occasion its 1,000-year anniversary.

=== Mecca ===
On 15 March 1965, the Saudi ambassador visited Germanus in Budapest with an invitation from King Faisal of Saudi Arabia. He was asked to visit Mecca (for the third time), to take part in the Islamic Conference (see Organisation of the Islamic Conference). The task was enormous, both for the scholar in his 80s and his wife, Aisha, also Muslim by that time. The trip meant walking round the sacred place and running between Safa and Marwa seven times, on a hot surface in a huge crowd. He accepted the invitation.

== Later years ==
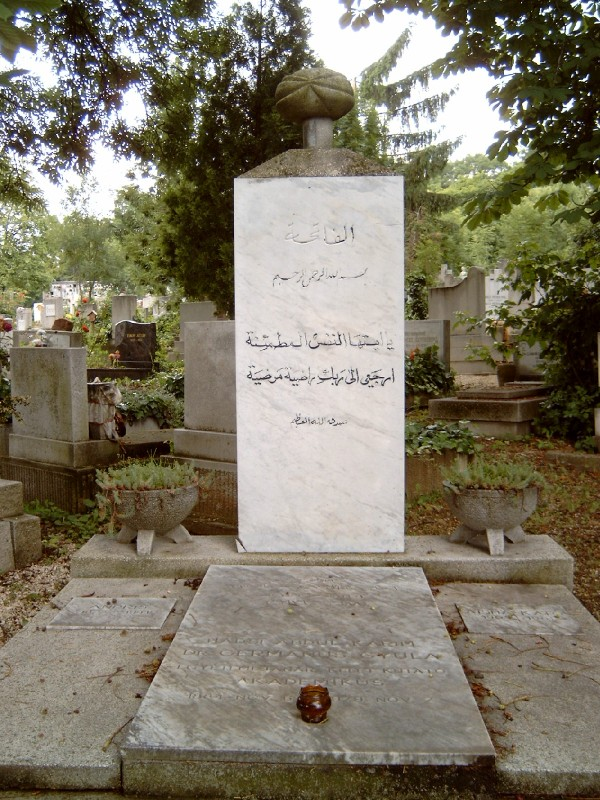
Grave of Gyula Germanus in the Farkasréti Cemetery, Budapest

He worked his entire life until his last days. His final wish was to see the third reprint of his book about the history of the Arabic literature. So he could get the quick print of the first pages into his hand. His last words on his death-bed summarize his life:

"I believe that the universe was made by a strong moral power, and unselfish love maintains it. The meaning of life is beauty and kindness. This confidence led me through my life, and the wish to get rest in the shadow of the big spirit. ... There I will get rest. Because power means aesthetic, art and kindness, and not hatred and greed. ... Hungary became lonely. ... He will never come back from the East again. ...".

== Main works ==
- Evlija Cselebi about the Turkish guilds in the 17th century, 1907;
- Schidlof 1000 - world languages on your own - English with [Dr. Latzkó Hugó], 1911 [embedded.: 1939];
- Schidlof Dr. practical method mini vocabulary. Hungarian-English and English-Hungarian, 1913;
- Turan, 1916;
- The impact of field and Species on history, 1920;
- The forming of the Osman state, 1921;
- Turkish-Osman language book, 1925;
- Thoughts at the tomb of Gül Baba, 1928;
- Pensées sur la révolution turque, 1928;
- Lecture on Turkish Popular Literature, Lahore, 1931;
- Modern Movements in Islam, Calcutta, 1932;
- India today, 1933;
- The Role of Turks in Islam, I–II., Hyderabad, 1933–34;
- The Awakening of Turkish Literature, I–II., Hyderabad, 1933;
- Light of India – Mahatma Gandhi, 1934;
- Allah Akbar!, 1936;
- Discovering and conquering Arabia, Syria and Mesopotamia, 1938;
- Sulle orme di Maometto, Milano, 1938;
- The rejuvenation of the Arabic ethos, 1944;
- Mahmoud Teymour and Modern Arab Literature, London, 1950;
- Sources of the Arab Nights, London, 1951
- Unknown Masterpieces of Arabic Literature, Hyderabad, 1952;
- Causes of the Decline of the Islamic Peoples, Lahore, 1953;
- Arabic Geographers, London, 1954;
- Bayna Fikraini, Damascus, 1956;
- Guidance From the Light of the Crescent, 1957;
- Trends of Contemporary Arabic Literature, I-II., London, 1957–58;
- Arabic poets from the pagan time to today, 1961;
- The history of Arabic literature, 1962;
- The Berber-Arab Literature of Morocco, Hyderabad, 1964;
- Lights of the East, 1966;
- Ibn Khaldoun, the Philosopher, Lahore, 1967;
- Arab Poets and Critics, Delhi, 1967;
- New Arabic Novelists, Lahore, 1969;
- The Mystical East, 1975; ("Guidance From the Light of the Crescent" and "Lights of the East" together)

== Books written by Gyula Germanus ==
(the list contains solely the latest editions of each work)

- Germanus, Gyula, Turku-i islâm khidmât; Aurangabad, 1932, 135p.
- Germanus, Gyula, Allah Akbar. Im Banne des Islams; Holle u. Co., Berlin, 1938, 718p.
- Germanus, Gyula, Sulle orme di Maometto; Garzanti, Milan, 1938, I. 406p., II. 376p.
- Germanus, Gyula, Az arab szellemiség megújhodása; Magyar Keleti Társaság Kiadványai 4., Budapest, 1944, 66p.
- Germanus, Gyula, Anwar al-Jundi; Quissa, Cairo, 1947.
- Germanus, Gyula, Bayna Fikrayni; Damascus, 1956, 128p.
- Germanus, Gyula, Musulmân Aqwâmki Zewalki Asbâb; Karachi, 1958.
- Germanus, Gyula, Az arab irodalom története; Gondolat Kiadó (3. ed.), 1979, Budapest, 471p.
- Germanus, Gyula, Allah Akbar!; Palatinus Kiadó, 2004, 632p; ISBN 978-963-9578-01-2.
- Germanus, Gyula, A félhold fakó fényében; Palatinus Kiadó, 2003, Budapest, 250p; ISBN 978-963-9487-22-2.
- Germanus, Gyula, Kelet fényei felé; Palatinus Kiadó, 2003, Budapest, 280p; ISBN 978-963-9487-45-1.
