= Károly Bund =

Hungarian professional forestry engineer (1869–1931)

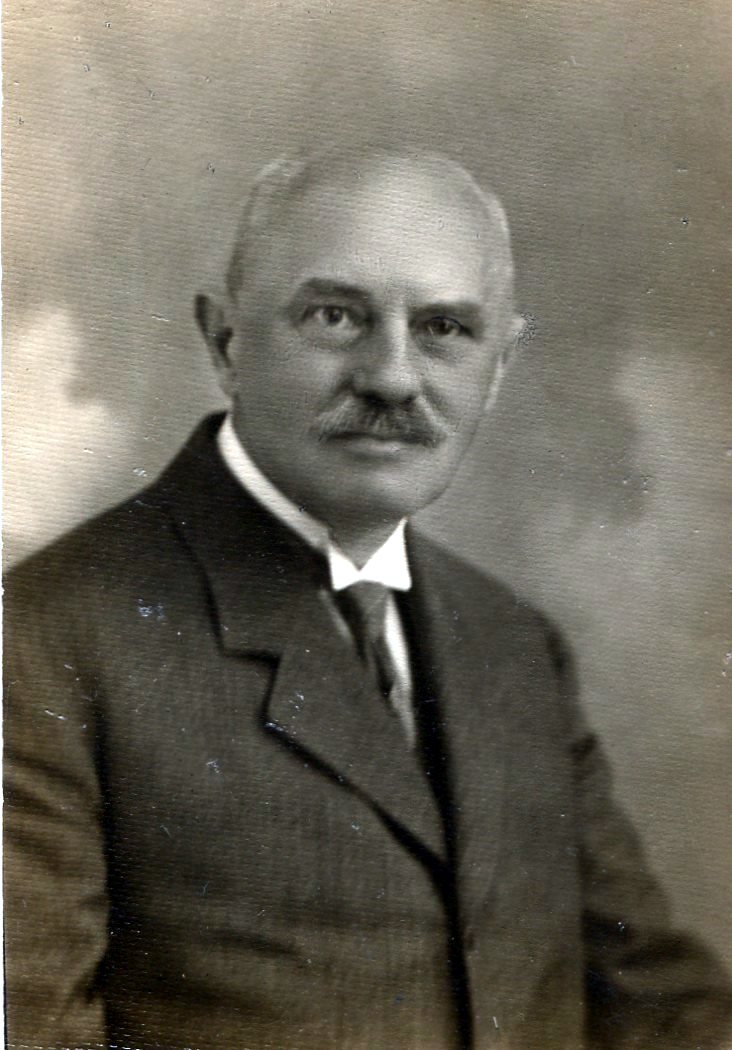
- Born: June 4, 1869; Besztercebánya, Austria-Hungary (now Banská Bystrica, Slovakia)
- Died: May 16, 1931 (aged 61); Budapest
- Resting place: Farkasréti Cemetery
- Education: Academy of Mining and Forestry in Selmecbánya
- Known for: Dendrology, forest planning and management, National Forestry Association
- Children: 4
- Scientific career
- Fields: Forestry engineering
- Workplaces: Forestry Directorate of Besztercebánya; Ministry of Agriculture; National Forestry Association

Károly Bund (4 June 1869 – 16 May 1931) was a Hungarian professional forestry engineer and an early environmentalist, serving as executive secretary of Hungary's National Forestry Association (Országos Erdészeti Egyesület), from 1900 until his death.

== Early life and education ==
He was born in Besztercebánya, Austria-Hungary (now Banská Bystrica, Slovakia), the only child of Emanuel Bund and Zsófia Ingruber, who had come from Elsaß-Lothringen, Germany.

Memorial sculpture on Károly Bund's grave in Budapest, placed on the second anniversary of his death by the National Forestry Association. It depicts a forester placing a wreath of remembrance on the broken stem of an oak tree.

Bund graduated in 1890 from the Academy of Mining and Forestry in Selmecbánya (now Banská Štiavnica). After a year in the military, Bund became a technical clerk at the Forestry Directorate of Besztercebánya. In 1893, Bund passed Hungary's national forestry examination with a perfect score. This led to his appointment to the Ministry of Agriculture's forest planning and management division.

Bund married Irén Palmer, the daughter of a mining engineer in Szatmár County. They had four children. Their daughter Sarolta married Béla Horváth, a public servant and Secretary of State for the Interior.

== Career ==
In 1900, Bund was elected executive secretary of the National Forestry Association. Under Bund's direction, the National Forestry Association worked to increase tree-planting in the Hungarian Plain, drafted new forestry laws, intensified efforts to protect natural forests and indigenous tree species, and protect the interests of forestry workers, both professional and skilled non-professional. Bund's main professional interest was forest planning and management, but he also was an expert in the study of tree growth, dendrology, phenology and genetics.

In 1906, at the Imperial Palace-Hofburg of Vienna, Franz Josef, Emperor of Austria and King of Hungary, conferred knighthood upon Bund, for his service to the country.

During Bund's career, he published 56 articles in which he was sole author, co-authored three others, and co-authored several books. With a colleague, he translated the Grundner-Schwappach tree-growth tables (Massentafeln) from German into Hungarian. These have been used in Hungary since that time. Bund was also editor of the Forestry Journal (Erdészeti Lapok) for 20 years.

== Later years and death ==
After the Treaty of Trianon in 1920, which deprived Hungary of 84% of its forest land, the National Forestry Association and the science of forestry in Hungary were in decline. The National Forestry Association could no longer afford to pay Bund a salary, so he worked evenings in part-time jobs in order to support his family. The strain of excessive work led to his death from heart failure in 1931 at the age of 62 in Budapest, Hungary.

Bund's grave, featuring a unique forestry-themed sculpture placed by the National Forestry Association, is located in Budapest's Farkasréti Cemetery [location 43-1-80]. The inscription on the side of the monument reads:

"To the grave marker of Károly Bund. You were the steward of a lush-leaved forest, when frost from Trianon chilled the trees. The trees grew sorrowful, their leaves fell, and as the leaves drifted away, so did you."
