= Elena Kaplinskaya =

Russian playwright

Elena Kaplinskaya (October 17, 1928 - January 3, 2014) was a Russian writer, playwright, and screenwriter. She was a member of the Russian Writers' Union, the Union of Journalists of Russia, and the Moscow Writers' Union.

== Biography ==
Elena Kaplinskaya was born in Moscow in 1928 and studied at the Musical College of Gnesin. In 1955, she graduated from the scriptwriting faculty of the VGIK and married Polish actor and film director Tsezary Kaplinsky. She was a member of the Russian Writers' Union from 1978 and a member of the Union of Journalists of Russia from 1994.

Elena Kaplinskaya's native city, Moscow, and the city played a central part in her stories. In her novel "A Moscow Story", the image of the city and its inhabitants are presented as the symbol of goodness and justice. The novel was translated into French in 1984 and was published in Paris by Messidor Publishing.

The heroes of her other novel, "The Cinema of Moscow", belong to the first generation of post-war youth in Russia. The story also partly takes part in Hungary and describes the lives of the Hungarian anti-fascists and the documentary film director Ilona Kolonits. Kaplinskaya wrote the play "The Best Loved" in memory of all those who died in World War II in Russia at the Battle of Kursk while defending the cities of Leningrad and Stalingrad.

== Filmography ==
- His 1991 holiday romance. Director: Gennady Dubrovin, Yuri Dmitrievich
- 1988 A Dangerous Man (based on the story "boxes and boxes")
- 1979 The skin of a polar bear, Odessa Film Studio, USSR, 1979, col., 79 min. triller, film director: Vadim Kostromenko
- 1975, 142 min, "Do not give up the queen" in 1975, 142 min, Drama, film director: Oleg Lentsius
- 1974 These are stories - a film-performance, drama, comedy. Director: Brovkin, Vyacheslav, Ishimbayevo, Lydia S.
- 1974 "The Meeting " 1st series
- 1974 "An Illusory Fact" 2nd series
- 1974 "Not at a Glance" 3 Series
- 1973 "The Engineer", TV drama, theatrical production of the" Little Theatre", Creative Association "Screen", the Moscow Stanislavsky Drama Theater, theatrical directors: Vladimir Bailey and Viitaly Ivanov
- 1969, 'The Valse" drama, Director: Victor Titov
- 1967 "Next to you", drama. Director: Dubrovin, Yuri Nikolaevich
- 1962 "Little Dreamers"
- 1962 "A Mistake"
- 1961 "The Day, which marks 30 years" BelarusFilm, 89 min. romantical drama, film director: Valentin Vinogradov

== Selected publications ==
=== Theatre plays ===
- "Spring orders" 1963
- "Gluhoman" 1965
- "Duty" 1964
- "A Pierce for Lovers" 1965
- "The Best Loved"

=== Short stories ===
- "Do not buy a cow, if you do not know how to milk her" 1992 - winner of the International Competition for the best woman's story in 1992, a collection of "What woman wants", Moscow, "Lenore", "Amrita" 1993
- "Boxes, little boxes" story 1988

=== Novels ===
- "A Moscow Story", novel, Moscow, Profizdat 1983 and Messidor Publishing, Paris 1984
- "The Cinema of Moscow", a novel, Moscow, Profizdat 1991
