= József Gera =

Hungarian physician and politician (1896–1946)

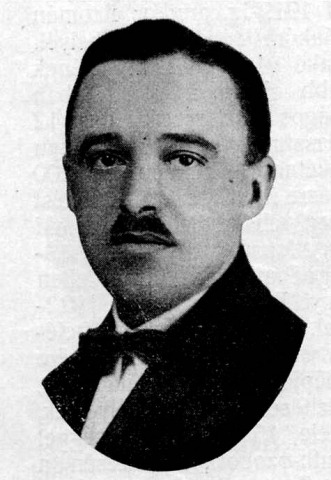
József Gera

József Gera (24 October 1896 – 12 March 1946) was a Hungarian physician and politician of the Arrow Cross Party.

He fought in the First World War and he was honoured. After the war he practised as a paediatrician in Makó. He had been a member of the Arrow Cross Party - Hungarist Movement since 1939. From 1944 he was responsible for the organizing of the party. Gera was elected to a member of the Regent Council, replacing Ferenc Rajniss, in March 1945.

After the Second World War he was sentenced to death by the People's Tribunal in Budapest. He was executed on 12 March 1946, along with Ferenc Szálasi, Gábor Vajna and Károly Beregfy.
