= Maurice Marinot =

French painter

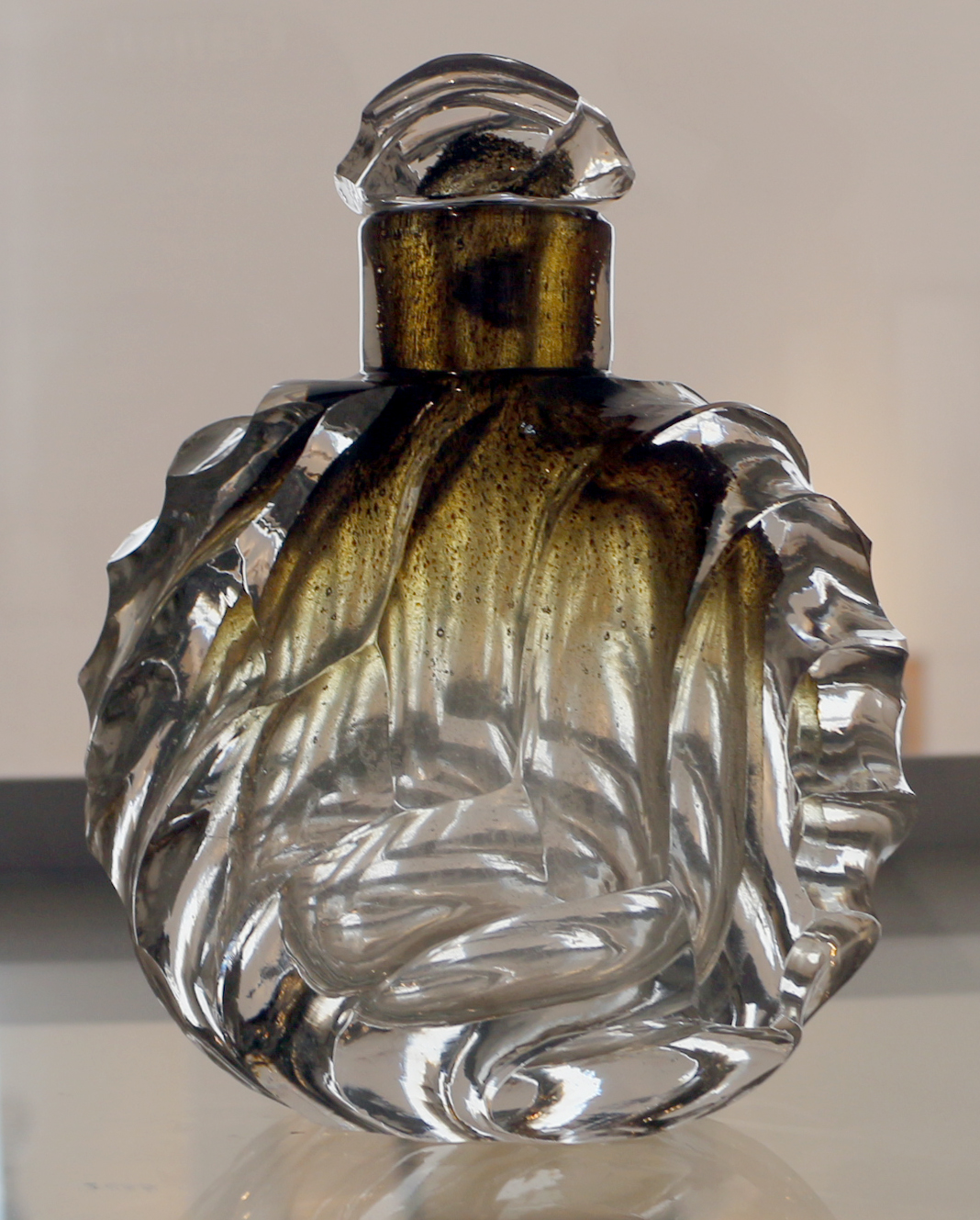
Bouteille (1933)

Maurice Marinot (French: [mɔʁis maʁino]; born 20 March 1882 in Troyes, France, died 1960, Troyes) was a French artist. He was a painter considered a member of Les Fauves, and then a major artist in glass.

Marinot's father was a bonnet maker. Maurice did poorly in school, but convinced his parents to send him to the École des Beaux-Arts in 1901 to train as a painter under French painter, Fernand Cormon. He left art school after his work wasn't accepted by the standards of the day. In 1905 he returned to Troyes, where he stayed for the rest of his life.

In 1911 he visited his first glass shop, owned by his friends, the Viard brothers, in Bar-sur-Seine. He fell in love with the contrasts between colors, hot and cold, the play of light and fire. He began designing bowls, vases and bottles which his friends made, then he painted enamels on the surface.

In 1912 he had his first exhibition and by 1913 critics were praising his work, saying “It has been a long time since an innovation of such great importance has come to enrich the art of glass” (Leon Rosenthal, Gazette des Beaux-Arts, 1913). From that year he stopped exhibiting his paintings.

The Viard brothers give Marinot his own bench and a set of tools, so he learned quickly how to blow glass. In 1923 he stopped using enamels, and explored the use of bubbles, metal leaf, and colored glass. His production process was “Long and fraught with danger” and one piece could take as long as a year to reach his standards.

The Viard Glassworks closed in 1937. Marinot was ill, and never touched glass again, though he did continue to paint. In the 1944 Allied bombing of Troyes there was direct hit on his studio, destroying over 2,500 paintings, thousands of drawings, and much of his glass. His sister's extensive collection was not damaged.

Major donation of Maurice Marinot (glass and paintings) was made by Pierre and Denise Levy to the Museum of Modern Art in Troyes in 1976. Florence, Marinot's daughter also gave major Maurice Marinot pieces of art to the city of Rennes Museum of Art.

A 20 piece glass collection by Marinot including vases, goblets and stoppered bottles dating to 1926-27 was gifted to the National Gallery of Ireland in 1970.
