= Margit Kovács =

Hungarian sculptor (1902–1977)

- Born: November 30, 1902; Győr, Hungary
- Died: June 4, 1977 (aged 74); Budapest, Hungary
- Known for: Ceramics
- Website: kovacsmargit.com

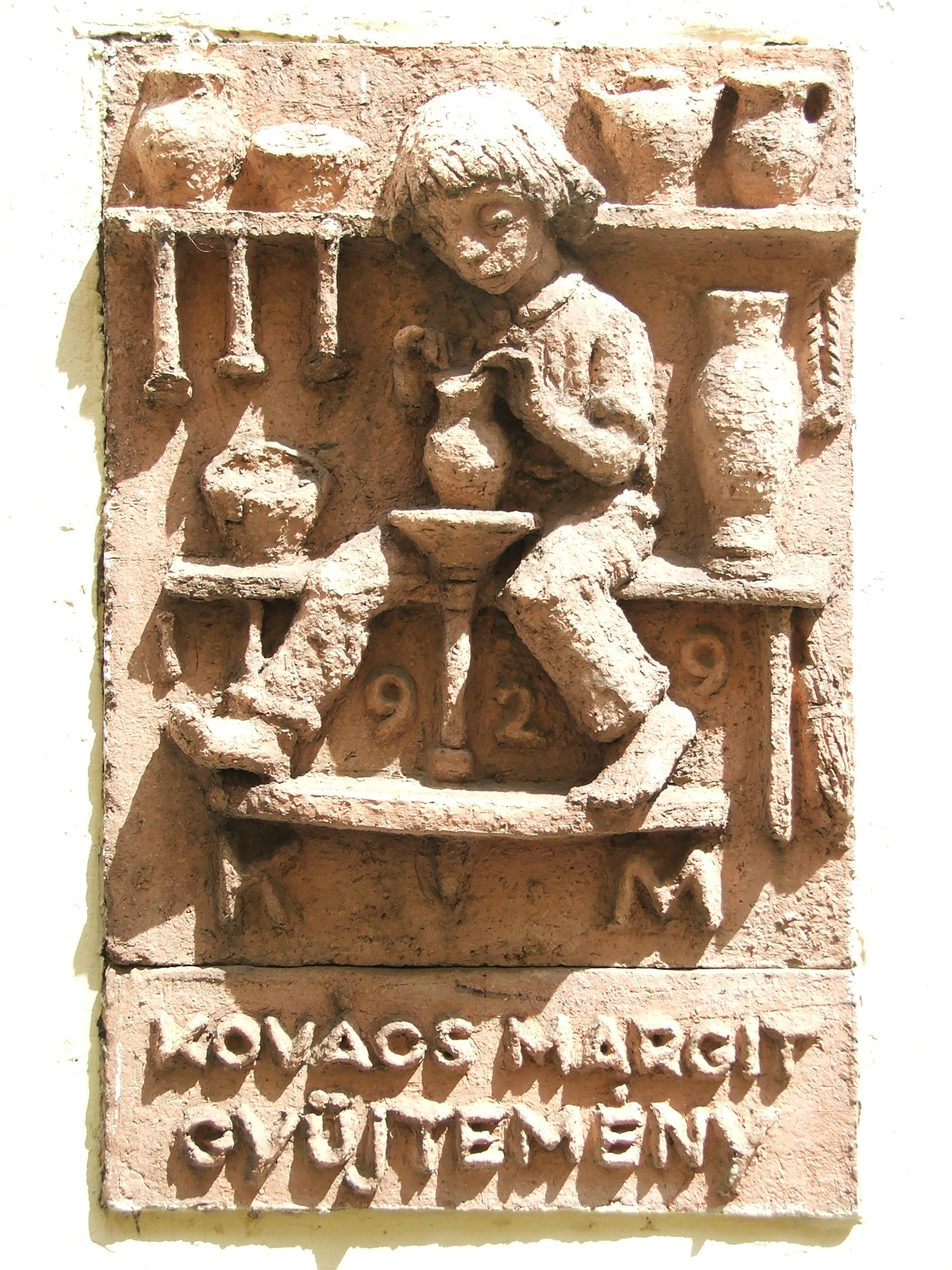
Plaque at the entrance to the Margit Kovács Museum in Szentendre

Margit Kovács (1902–1977) was a Hungarian ceramist and sculptor.

== Life ==
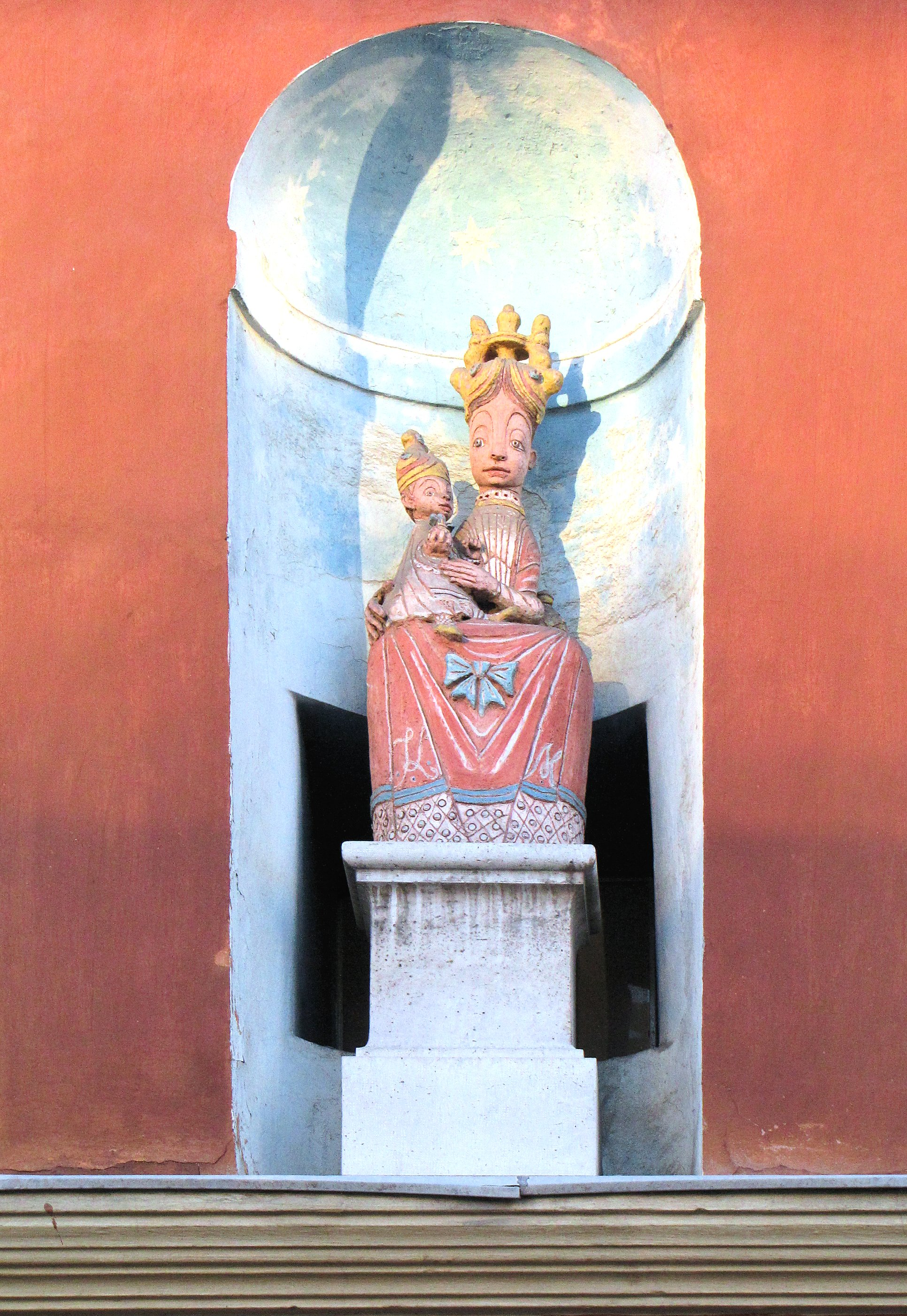
Madonna and child in the Castle district, Budapest

Margit Kovács was born into a Jewish Hungarian family in Győr, Hungary on 30 November 1902. She originally wished to become a graphic artist but she grew interested in ceramics in the 1920s and went to study in Vienna with Hertha Bücher, a famous Austrian ceramic artist, from 1926-1928. Then she studied clay modelling in Munich at the State School of Applied Arts under Karl Killer (1928–29). She was a fellow student here, then lifelong friend of Julia Bathory, glass artist. She studied in Copenhagen in 1932 and in 1933 she was at Sèvres Porcelain factory where she mastered the art of modelling with chamotte clay to make figures.

She won international awards in Milan, Paris, Berlin, Brussels and Rome. She was very popular in Hungary and received many public commissions. The Communist regime gave her the Distinguished Artist Award in 1959.

== Work ==
Her first public exhibition was in Budapest in 1928 and from then on her output was prolific and she continued working throughout the Second World War. She produced statuettes, pots, plates, wall plaques and tiled murals.

Her main themes are country folk, family life and bible stories. Her work is very varied but is characterised by flowing lines which curve sensually to evoke sentiment. One of her most significant works of religious art is the portal of the Saint Emeric Church (Szent Imre templom) of Győr (1939–1940).

Several of her ceramic murals are still visible in Budapest and other cities. Those in Budapest at the time of her death were:

Fisher Boy, 1932	Ponty utca 14
St. Florian, 1935	Fürst Sándor utca 16
The Peacock Alighted, c.1935	Vármegye utca 15
Signs of the Zodiac, c.1936	Foyer of Kosciuszkó Tádé utca 14
To the Old Post House, 1937	Régiposta utca 13
Budapest, Queen of the Danube, 1937	IBUSZ, Roosevelt tér 5 (fragment)
Adam and Eve, c.1939-40	Vármegye utca 15
Fishing, Hunting, 1942	Lobby of Bimbó út 11
The First of May, 1946	Ministry of Education
Map of Lake Balaton, 1950	Hall of the Déli railway station
Fountain Pool, c.1950	Pioneer Store (demolished)
Folk Dance Group Rehearsing, 1952	Ministry of Foreign Affairs
The Seasons, 1953	Budapest Museum of History
The Matyó Family, 1955	Museum of Applied Arts
Wine Harvest, 1955	Museum of Applied Arts
Games, 1959	Ministry of Education
The Meteorologist, 1960	National Meteorological Institute
Two Girls Went to Pick Flowers, 1961	Museum of Applied Arts
In Remembrance of Things Past, 1961	Blood Donor HQ
Into the Woods, 1965	Home for Handicapped Children

In 1972 she donated the majority of her work to the Pest County Museums Directorate in Szentendre. A museum of her work was opened in 1973 in Vastagh Street, Szentendre. There is also a collection in Győr.

== Death ==
Kovács died in Budapest on 4 June 1977. Her grave is in Farkasréti Cemetery in Budapest.

== Gallery ==
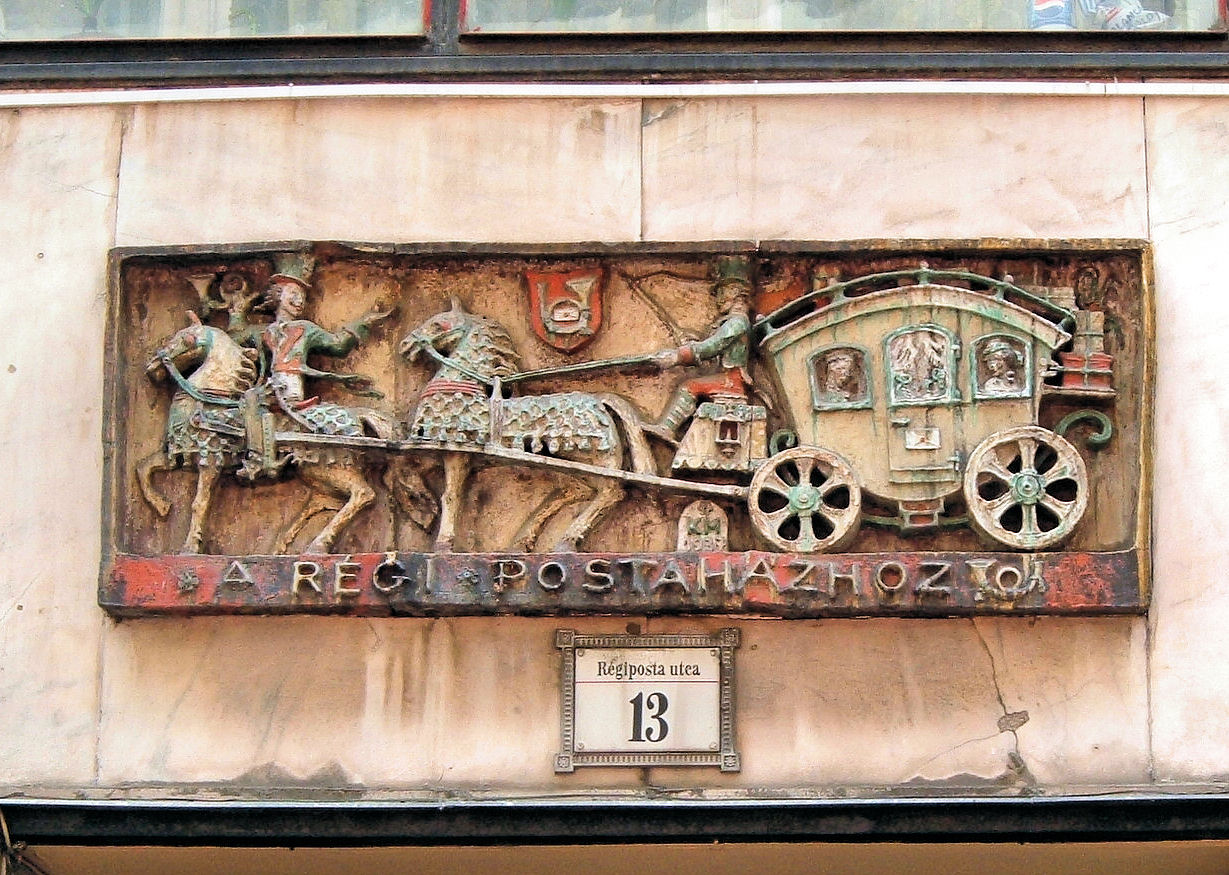
Old Post Office Building in a Budapest street

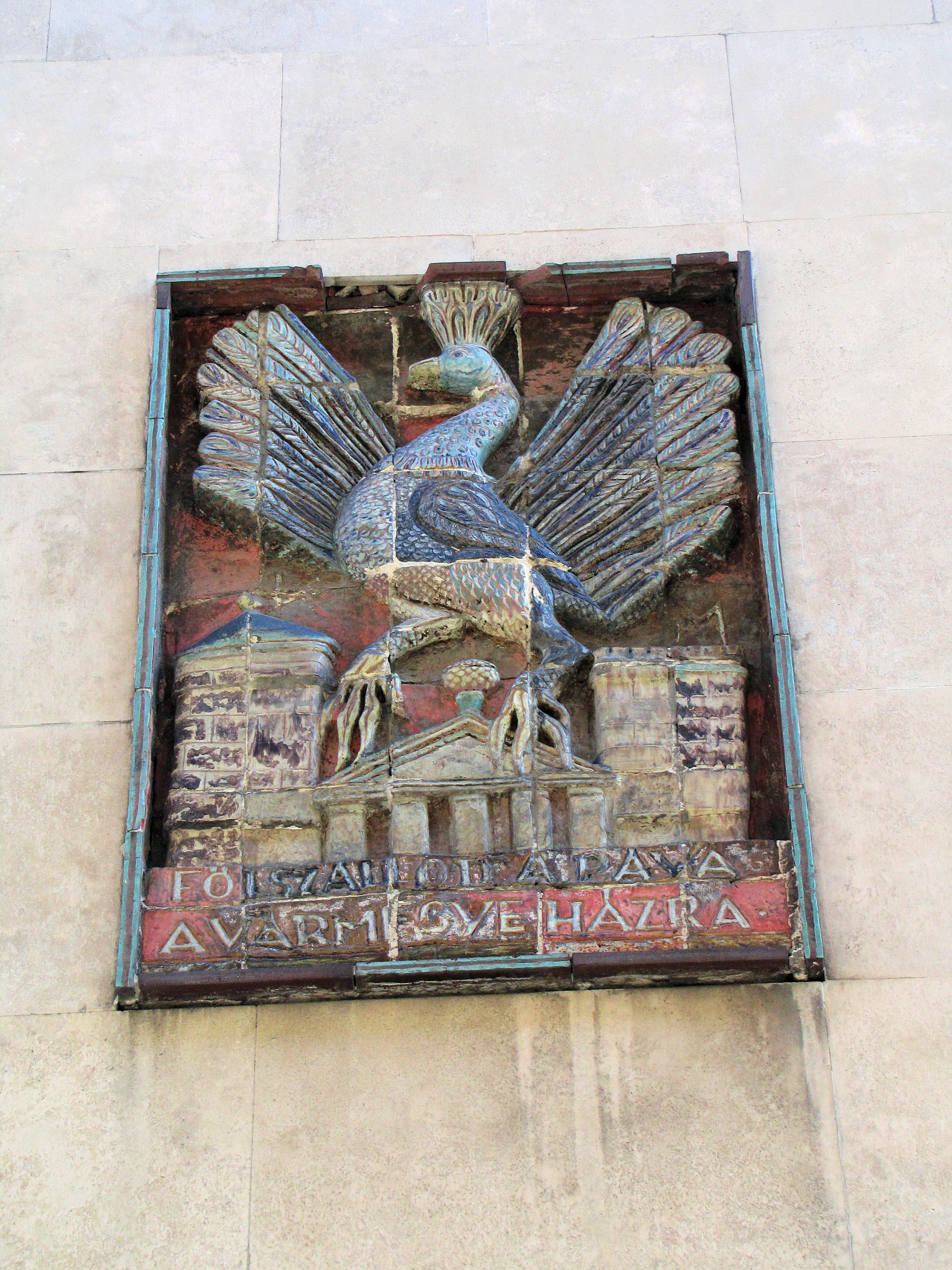
Plaque in Vármegye street, Budapest

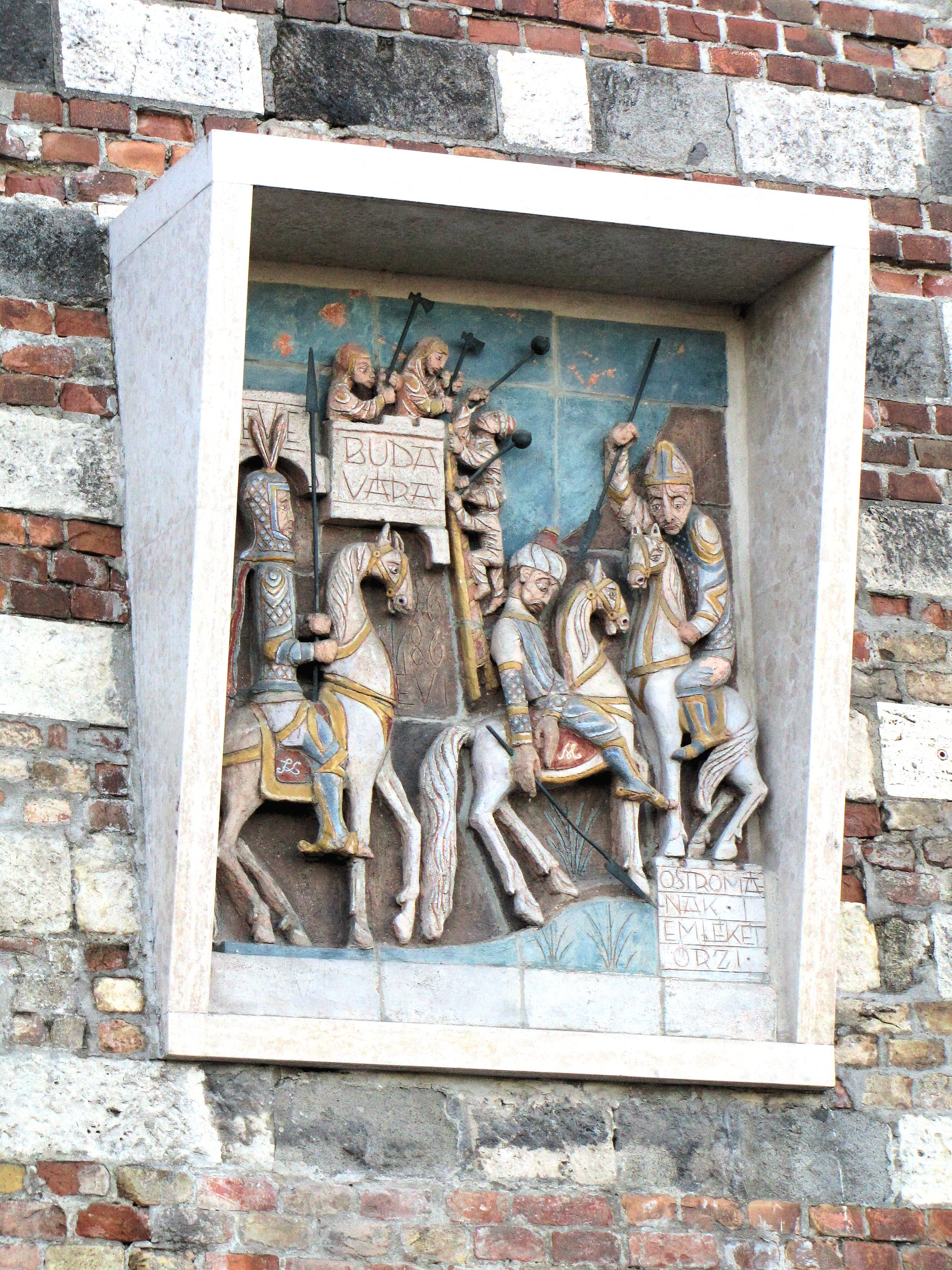
Ceramic panel at the Bécsi Gate of Buda Castle
