= Ministry of Interior (Hungary) =

Government minister of Hungary

Ministry of Interior of Hungary
- Belügyminisztérium
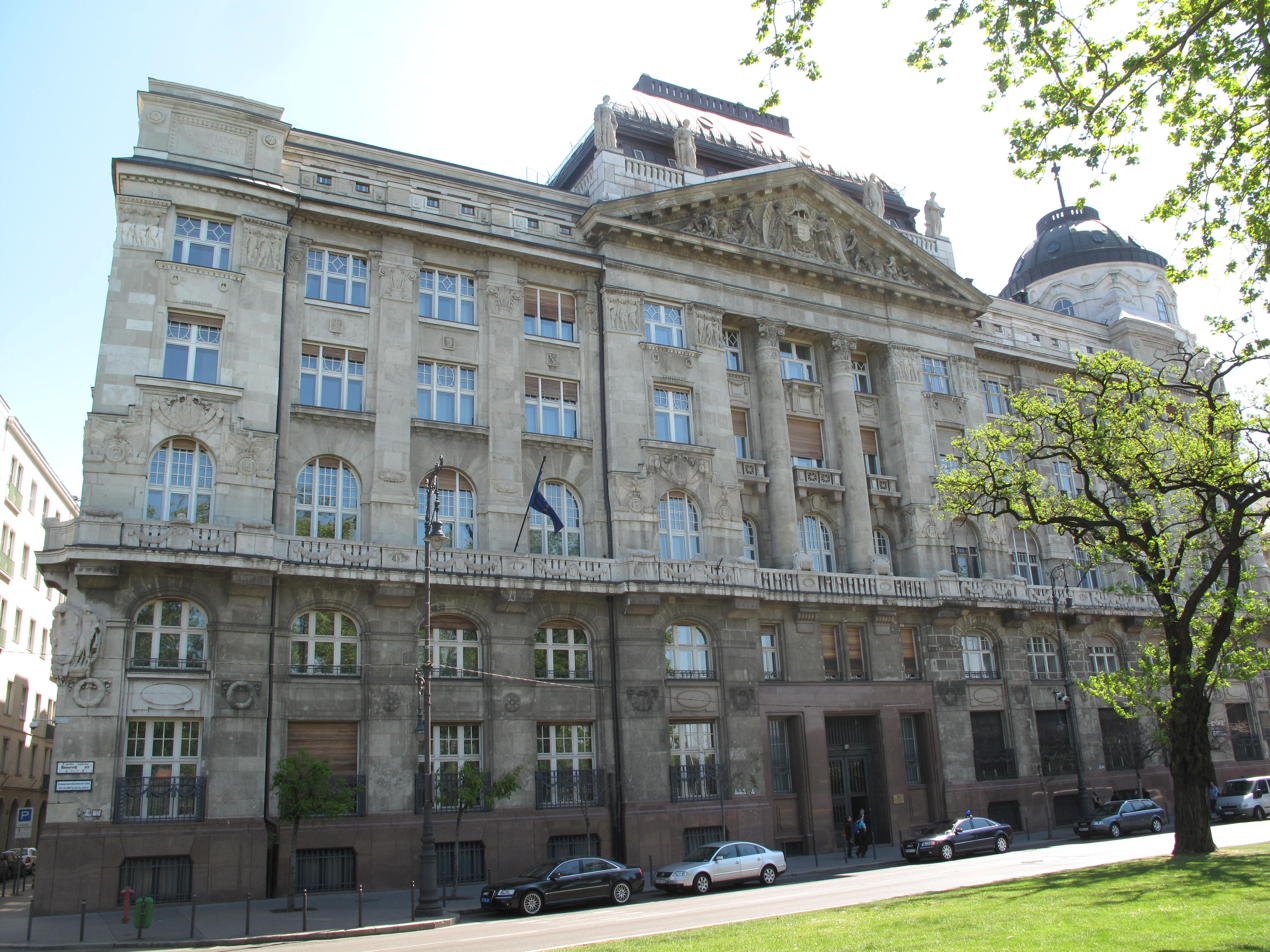
- The seat of the ministry at István Széchenyi Square in Budapest, former head office of Hungarian Commercial Bank of Pest

Agency overview
- Formed: 1848
- Jurisdiction: Government of Hungary
- Headquarters: Budapest, Hungary; 47°29′57″N 19°02′56″E
- Agency executive: Gábor Pósfai, Minister
- Website: www.kormany.hu/hu/belugyminiszterium

The Ministry of Interior of Hungary (Hungarian: Belügyminisztérium [ˈbɛlyɟministeːrijum]) is a part of the Hungarian state organisation. Its head, the Minister of the Interior, is a member of the Hungarian cabinet. The ministry was established in 1848.

Between 2006 and 2010 the ministry was split into the Ministry of Local Government and the Ministry of Justice and Law. In 2010 the prior organization was restored.

During the existence of the Hungarian People's Republic, a number of security agencies were under the Ministry of Interior. These included the Internal Troops (Belső Karhatalom); the State Protection Authority (Államvédelmi Hatóság, ÁVH)'s and the Border Guard, wearing army uniforms, 15,000 strong; and the Workers' Militia (Munkás Őrség, MO). By mid-1986 it was estimated that the Border Guard were 16,000 strong, with 11,000 conscripts, divided into 11 districts.

== See also ==
- Constitution Protection Office
