= 1901 =

1901 in various calendars
- Gregorian calendar: 1901; MCMI
- Ab urbe condita: 2654
- Armenian calendar: 1350; ԹՎ ՌՅԾ
- Assyrian calendar: 6651
- Baháʼí calendar: 57–58
- Balinese saka calendar: 1822–1823
- Bengali calendar: 1307–1308
- Berber calendar: 2851
- British Regnal year: 64 Vict. 1 – 1 Edw. 7
- Buddhist calendar: 2445
- Burmese calendar: 1263
- Byzantine calendar: 7409–7410
- Chinese calendar: 庚子年 (Metal Rat); 4598 or 4391 — to — 辛丑年 (Metal Ox); 4599 or 4392
- Coptic calendar: 1617–1618
- Discordian calendar: 3067
- Ethiopian calendar: 1893–1894
- Hebrew calendar: 5661–5662
- Hindu calendars
- Vikram Samvat: 1957–1958
- Shaka Samvat: 1822–1823
- Kali Yuga: 5001–5002
- Holocene calendar: 11901
- Igbo calendar: 901–902
- Iranian calendar: 1279–1280
- Islamic calendar: 1318–1319
- Japanese calendar: Meiji 34 (明治３４年)
- Javanese calendar: 1830–1831
- Julian calendar: Gregorian minus 13 days
- Korean calendar: 4234
- Minguo calendar: 11 before ROC 民前11年
- Nanakshahi calendar: 433
- Thai solar calendar: 2443–2444
- Tibetan calendar: ལྕགས་ཕོ་བྱི་བ་ལོ་ (male Iron-Rat); 2027 or 1646 or 874 — to — ལྕགས་མོ་གླང་ལོ་ (female Iron-Ox); 2028 or 1647 or 875

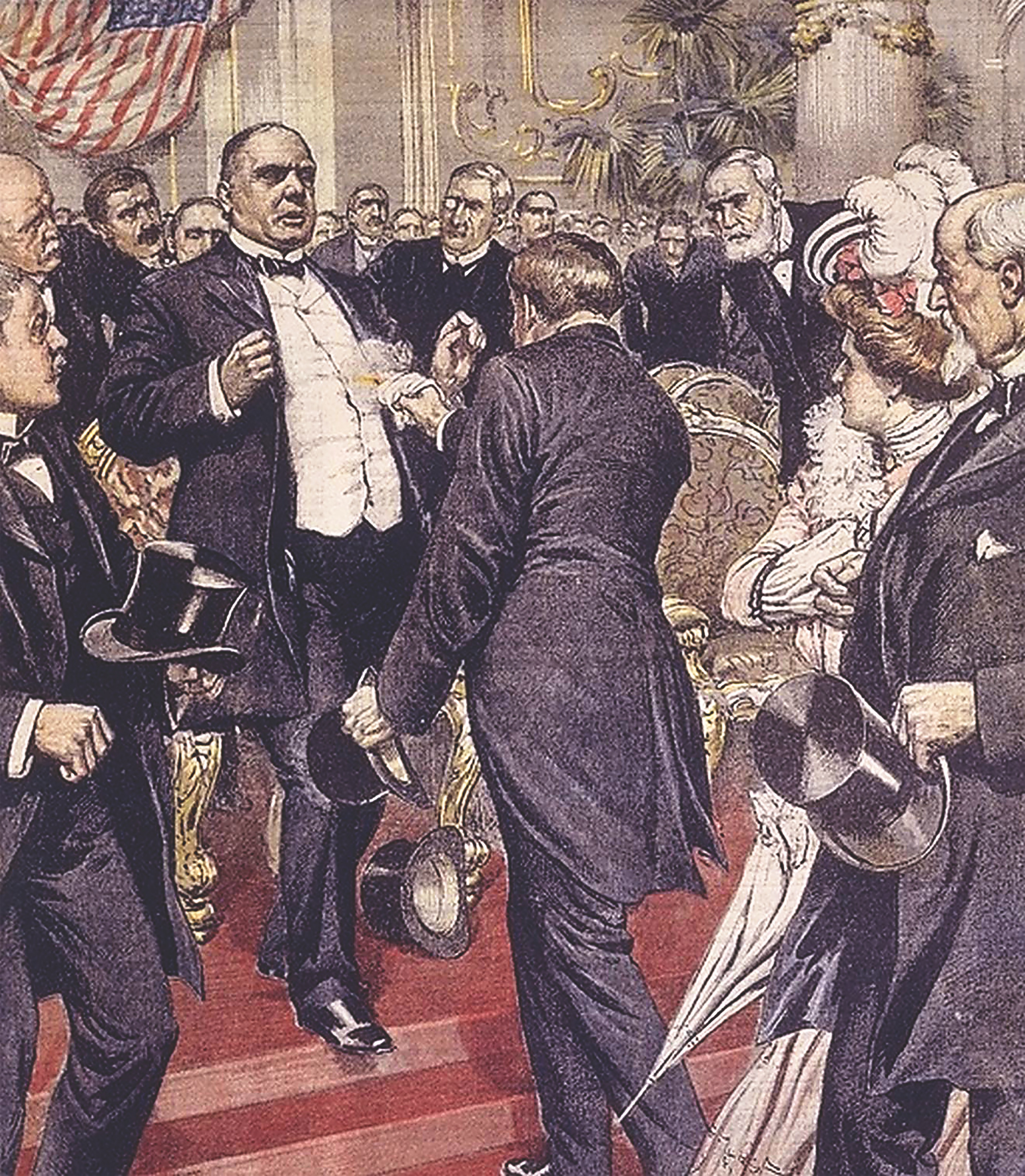
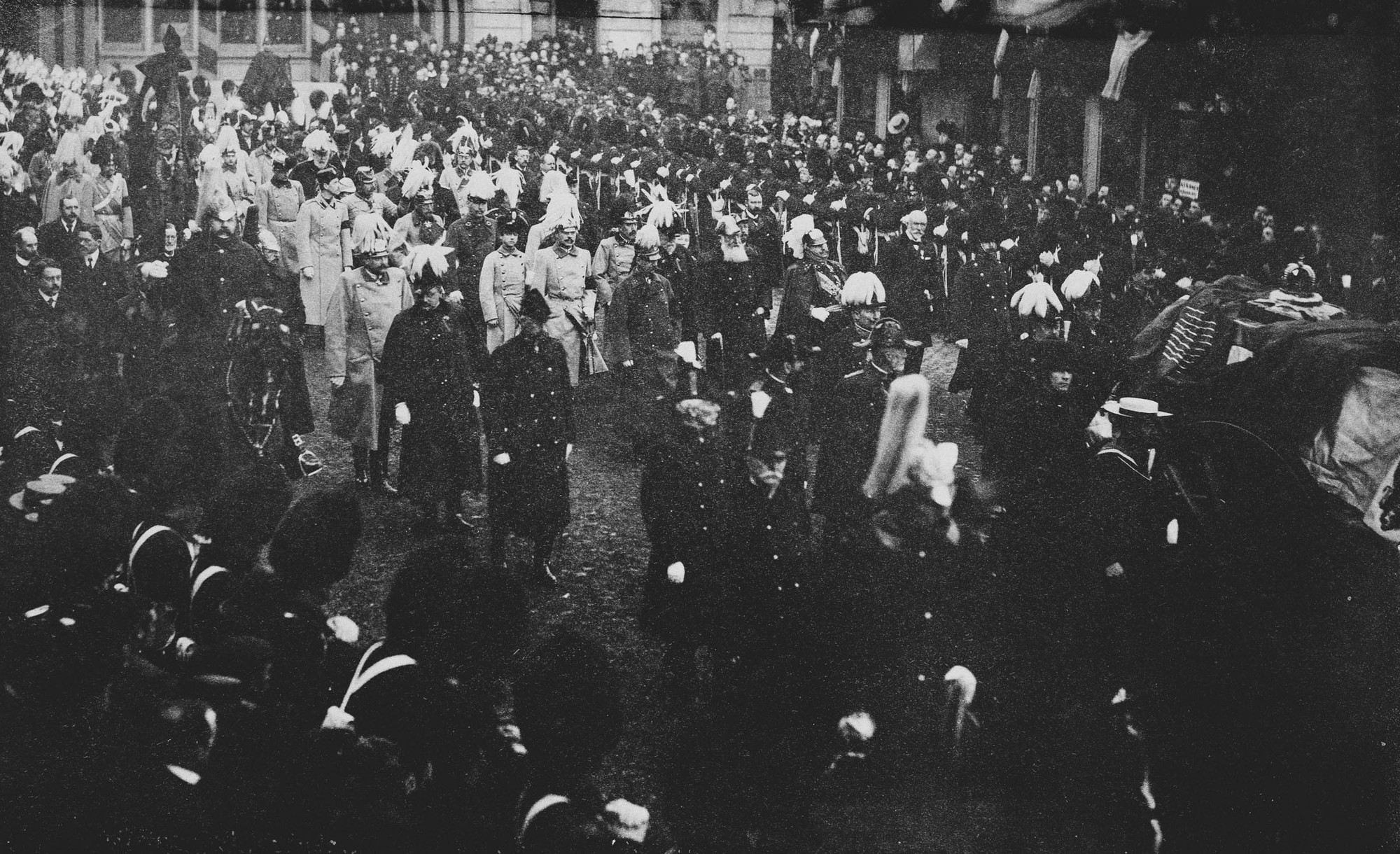
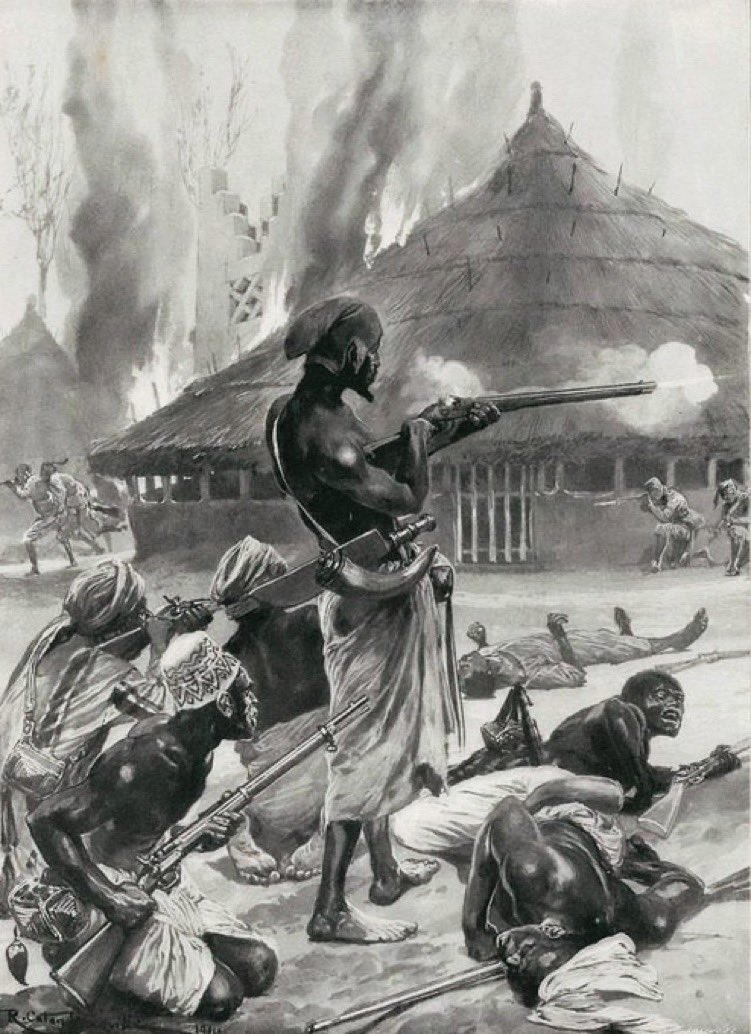
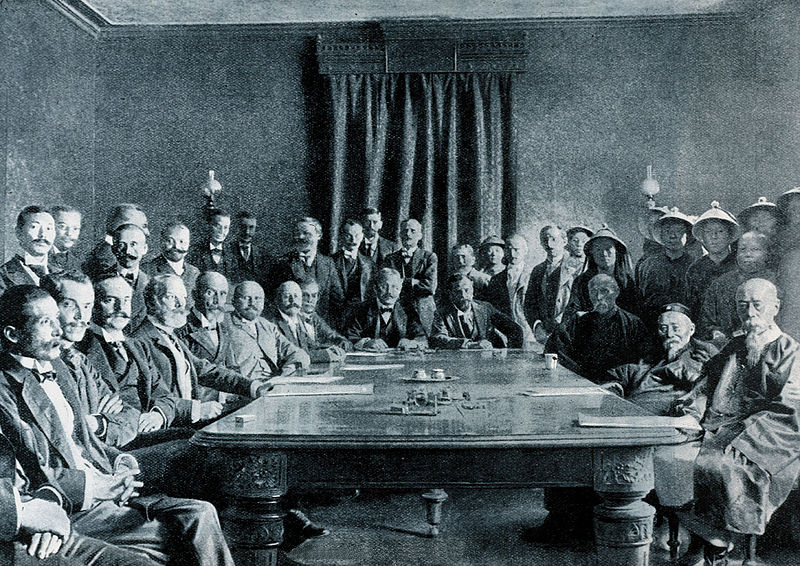
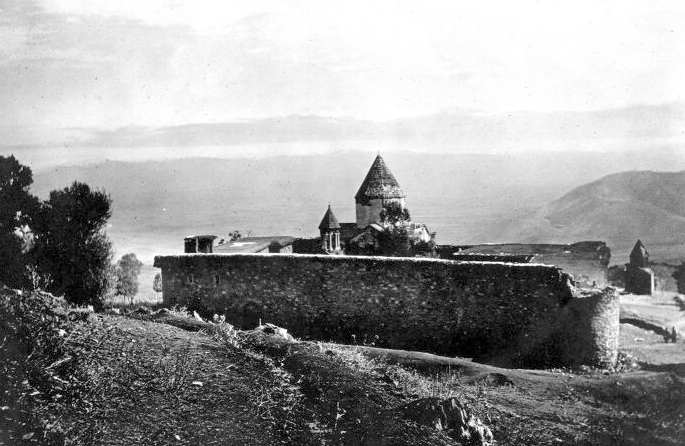
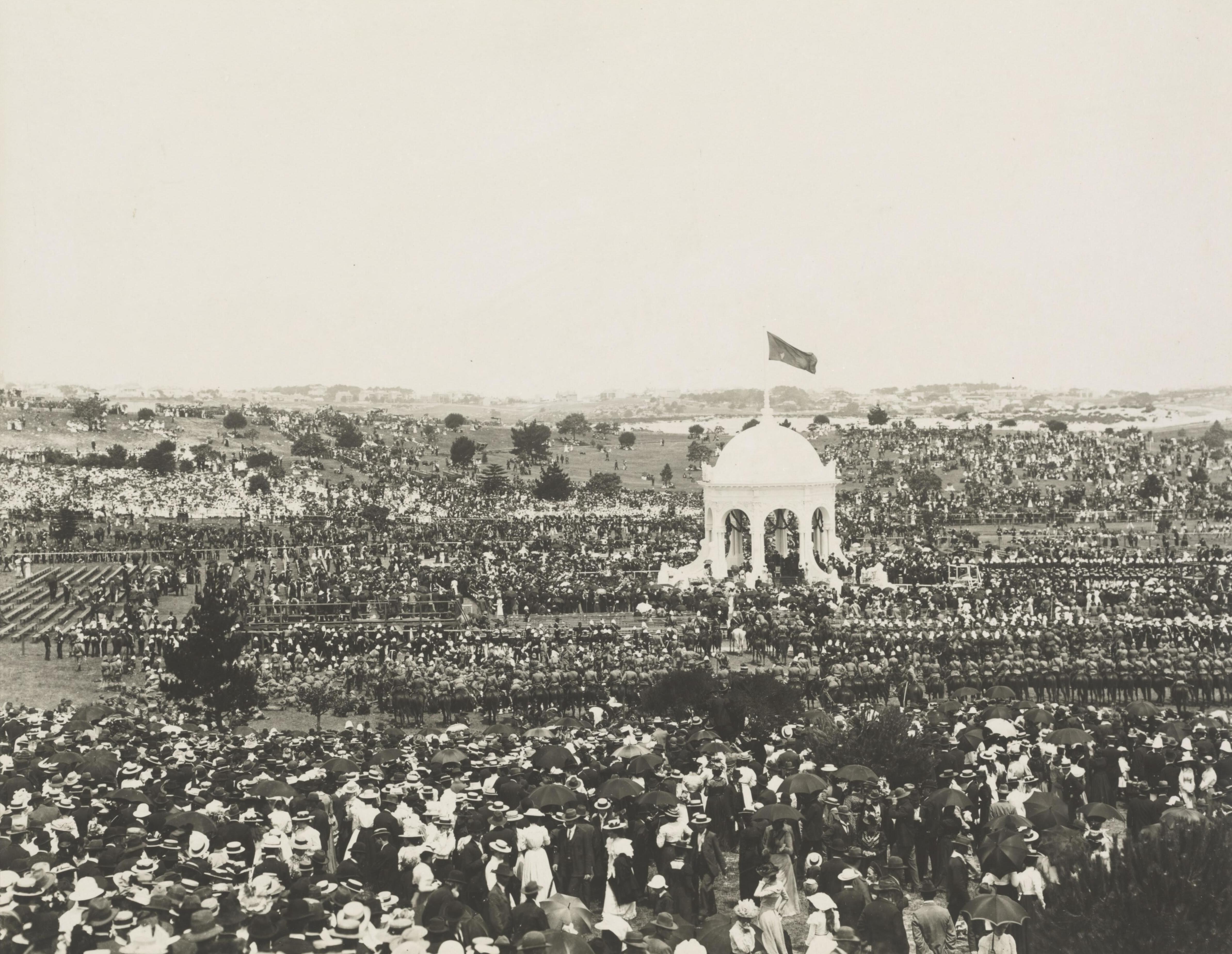
From top to bottom, left to right:
- President William McKinley is assassinated, making Theodore Roosevelt president;
- Queen Victoria dies, ending the Victorian era;
- The Anglo-Aro War expands British colonial rule in present-day Nigeria;
- The Boxer Protocol ends the Boxer Rebellion;
- The Battle of Holy Apostles Monastery marks the last major Armenian resistance in Eastern Anatolia;
- The Federation of Australia unites six colonies into the Commonwealth of Australia.

1901 (MCMI) was a common year starting on Tuesday of the Gregorian calendar and a common year starting on Monday of the Julian calendar, the 1901st year of the Common Era (CE) and Anno Domini (AD) designations, the 901st year of the 2nd millennium, the 1st year of the 20th century, and the 2nd year of the 1900s decade. As of the start of 1901, the Gregorian calendar was 13 days ahead of the Julian calendar, which remained in localized use until 1923.

December 13 of this year is the beginning of signed 32-bit Unix time, and is scheduled to end in January 19, 2038.

== Summary ==
=== Political and military ===
1901 started with the unification of multiple British colonies in Australia on January 1 to form the Commonwealth of Australia after a referendum in 1900, Subsequently, the 1901 Australian election would see the first Australian prime minister, Edmund Barton. On the same day, Nigeria became a British protectorate.

Following this, the Victorian Era would come to an end after Queen Victoria died on January 22 after a reign of 63 years and 216 days, which was longer than those of any of her predecessors. Her son, Edward VII, succeeded her to the throne.

In the United States, although President William McKinley won reelection in the previous year's presidential election to a second term, he became the third president to be assassinated in office when he was shot by anarchist Leon Czolgosz on September 6, dying eight days later. His vice president, Theodore Roosevelt would succeed him.

== Events ==
=== January ===
January 1: The Commonwealth of Australia forms as British colonies federate.

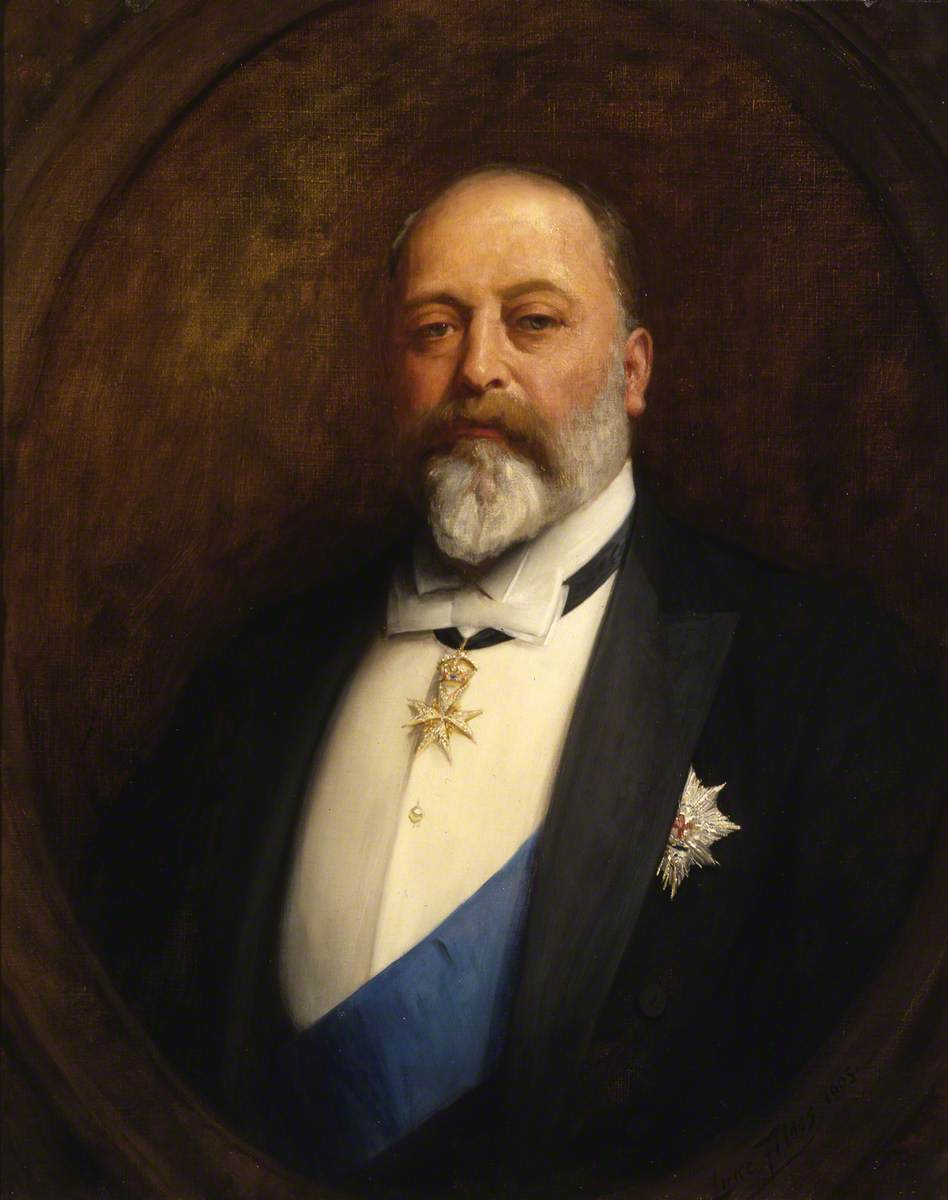
January 22: King Edward VII ascends the British throne.

- January 1
  - The British colonies of New South Wales, Queensland, South Australia, Tasmania, Victoria and Western Australia federate as the Commonwealth of Australia; Edmund Barton becomes the first Prime Minister of Australia.
  - Nigeria becomes a British protectorate.
- January 9 – Lord Kitchener reports that Christiaan de Wet has shot one of the "peace" envoys, and flogged two more, who had gone to his commando to ask the Burgher citizens of South Africa to halt fighting.
- January 22 – Queen Victoria of the United Kingdom dies at Osborne House on the Isle of Wight. She is 81 years old and, having ruled for nearly 64 years, will be the second longest-reigning monarch in British history. Her eldest son, Prince Albert Edward, "Bertie", the longest-serving Prince of Wales to this time, succeeds his mother at the age of 59, reigning as King Edward VII, of the United Kingdom and in innovation the British Dominions and also becoming Emperor of India.
- January 31 – Anton Chekhov's play Three Sisters (Три сeстры, Tri sestry) is premiered at the Moscow Art Theatre.

=== February ===
- February 2 – The State funeral of Queen Victoria, held at St George's Chapel, Windsor Castle, UK, is attended by many European royals, including Kaiser Wilhelm II and Archduke Franz Ferdinand of Austria.
- February 12 – Viceroy of India Lord Curzon creates the new North-West Frontier Province in the north of the Punjab region, bordering Afghanistan.
- February 14 – Edward VII opens his first parliament of the United Kingdom.
- February 20 – The Hawaii Territory Legislature convenes for the first time.
- February 22 – The Pacific Mail Steamship Company's SS City of Rio de Janeiro sinks entering San Francisco Bay, killing 128.
- February 23 – The United Kingdom and Germany agree on the frontier between German East Africa and Nyasaland.
- February 25 – U.S. Steel is incorporated by industrialist J. P. Morgan, as the first billion-dollar corporation.
- February 26
  - Chi-hsui and Hsu-cheng-yu, Boxer Rebellion leaders, are executed in Peking.
  - The Middelburg peace conference fails in South Africa, as Boers continue to demand autonomy.
- February 27 – The Sultan of Turkey orders 50,000 troops to the Bulgarian frontier because of unrest in Macedonia.

=== March ===
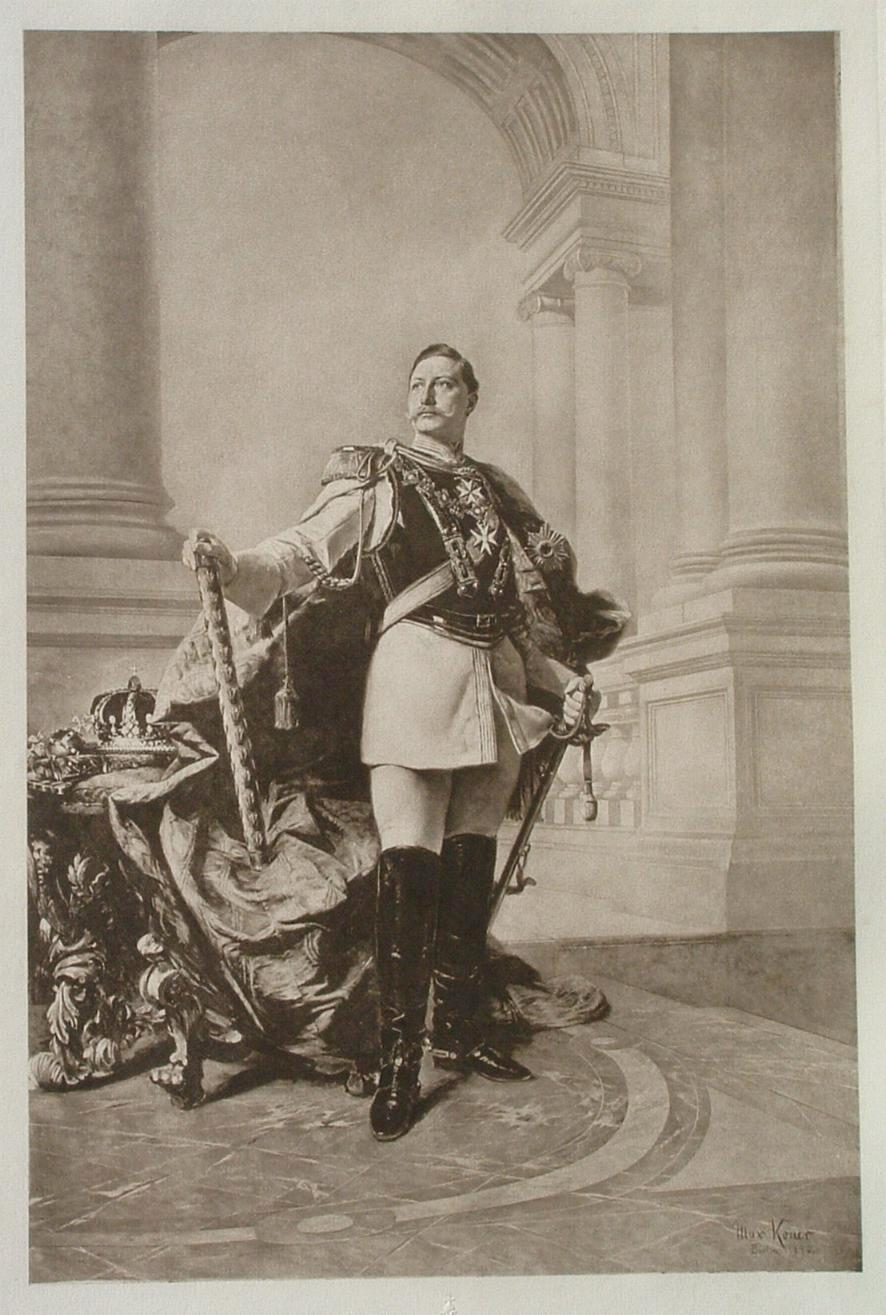
March 6: Wilhelm II, German Emperor, survives an assassination attempt.

- March 1
  - The United Kingdom, Germany and Japan protest the Sino-Russian agreement on Manchuria.
  - The 1901 Census of India is taken, the fourth, and first reliable, census of the British Raj.
- March 2 – The United States Congress passes the Platt Amendment, limiting the autonomy of Cuba as a condition for the withdrawal of American troops.
- March 5 – Irish nationalist demonstrators are ejected by police from the House of Commons of the United Kingdom in London.
- March 6 – In Bremen, an assassination attempt is made on Wilhelm II, German Emperor.
- March 17 – The first large-scale showing of Van Gogh's paintings takes place in Paris, as 71 are shown at the Bernheim-Jeune gallery, 11 years after his death.
- March 31
  - A 7.2 M_{w} Black Sea earthquake occurs off the northeast coast of Bulgaria, with a maximum intensity of X (Extreme). A destructive tsunami affects the province of Dobrich.
  - The United Kingdom Census 1901 is taken. The number of people employed in manufacturing is at its highest-ever level.

=== April ===
- April 19 – The First Philippine Republic is formally dissolved, after president Emilio Aguinaldo calls all Filipino forces to lay down arms and cease hostilities.
- April 29 – Anti-Semitic rioting breaks out in Budapest.

=== May ===
- May 3 – The Great Fire of 1901 begins in Jacksonville, Florida.
- May 5 – The Caste War of Yucatán in Mexico officially ends, although Mayan skirmishers continue sporadic fighting for another decade.
- May 9 – The first Australian Parliament opens in Melbourne.
- May 17 – Panic of 1901: The New York Stock Exchange crashes.
- May 24 – 81 miners are killed in an accident at Universal Colliery, Senghenydd in South Wales.
- May 25 – The Club Atlético River Plate is founded in Argentina.
- May 28 – D'Arcy Concession: Mozaffar ad-Din Shah Qajar of Persia grants British businessman William Knox D'Arcy a concession giving him an exclusive right to prospect for oil.

=== June ===
June 12: Cuba becomes a United States protectorate.

- June 12 – Cuba becomes a United States protectorate.
- June 15 – RMS Lucania is the first Cunard Line ship to receive a wireless radio set.
- June 18 – British peace campaigner Emily Hobhouse reports on the high mortality and cruel conditions in the Second Boer War concentration camps.
- June 24
  - The first showing of Picasso's paintings in Paris as the 19-year-old Spanish artist exhibits his work at Ambroise Vollard's gallery.
  - English Association Football Club Brighton & Hove Albion is formed by John Jackson to replace the amateur Brighton and Hove Rangers, following a meeting at the Seven Stars Hotel on Ship Street, Brighton.

=== July–August ===
- July 1 – The first United Kingdom Fingerprint Bureau is established at Scotland Yard, the Metropolitan Police headquarters in London, by Edward Henry.
- July 4
  - The 1,282 foot (390 m) covered bridge crossing the Saint John River at Hartland, New Brunswick, Canada opens. It is the longest covered bridge in the world.
  - William Howard Taft becomes Governor-General of the Philippines.
- July 10 – The world's first passenger-carrying trolleybus in regular service operates on the Biela Valley Trolleybus route at Königstein, Germany.
- August 5 – Peter O'Connor sets the first International Association of Athletics Federations recognised long jump world record, of 24 ft 11¾ ins (7.61m). The record will stand for 20 years.
- August 6 – Discovery Expedition: Robert Falcon Scott sets sail from Britain on the RRS Discovery to explore the Ross Sea in Antarctica.
- August 14 – The first claimed powered flight is made, by German-born American aviator Gustave Whitehead, in his Number 21, in Connecticut.
- August 21 – The International Secretariat of National Trade Union Centres is founded in Copenhagen.
- August 30 – Hubert Cecil Booth patents an electric vacuum cleaner, in the United Kingdom.

=== September ===
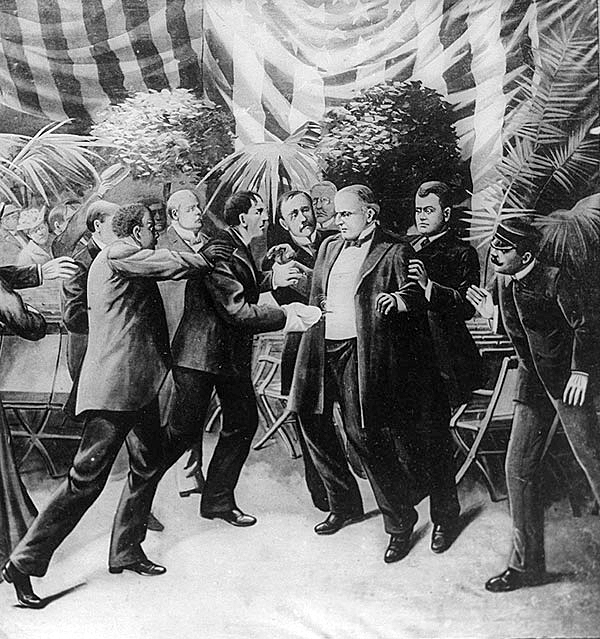
September 6: US President William McKinley is shot and fatally wounded.

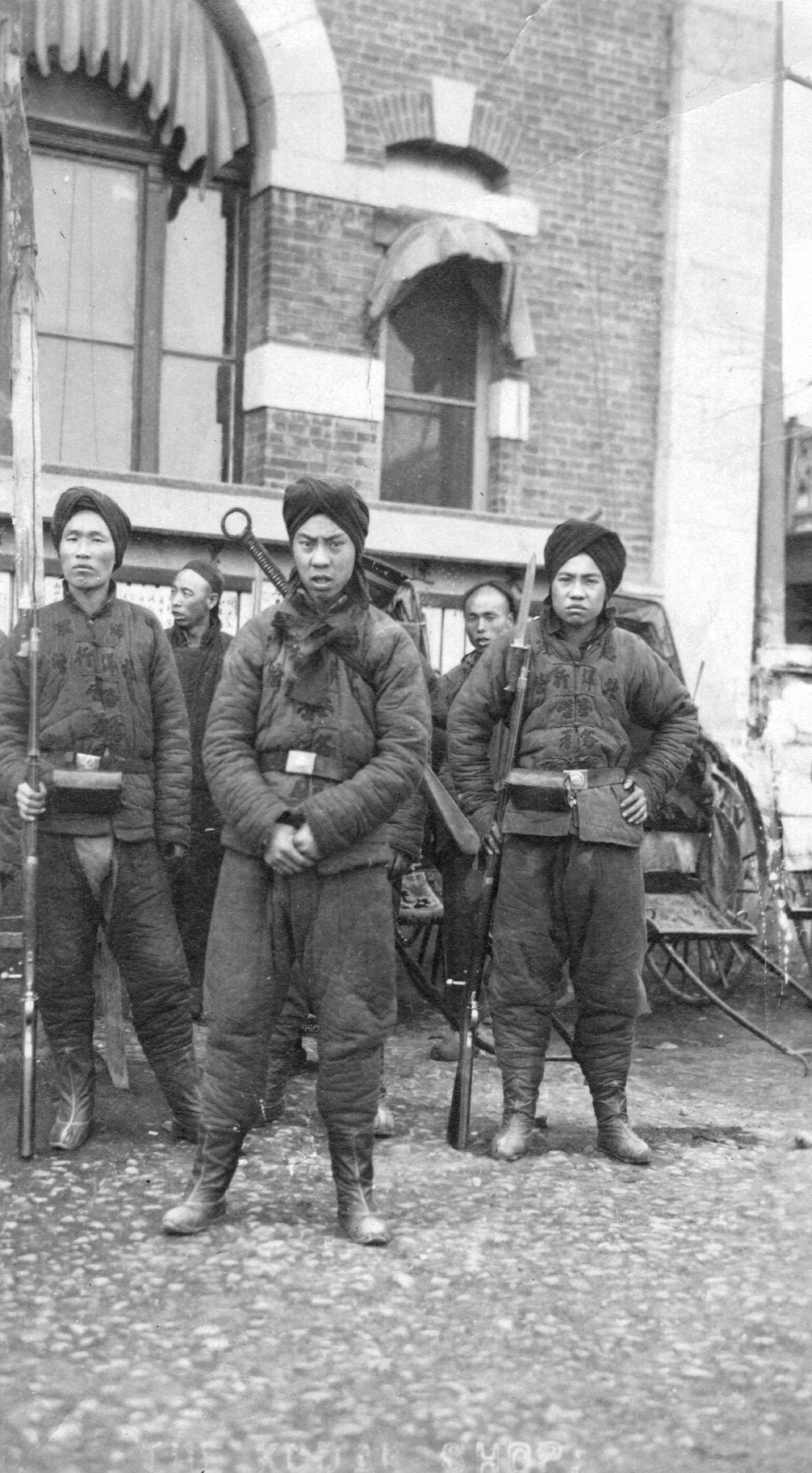
September 7: The Boxer Rebellion in China ends with the signing of the Peking Protocol.

- September 5 – The National Association of Professional Baseball Leagues (later renamed Minor League Baseball), is formed in Chicago.
- September 6 – Assassination of William McKinley: American anarchist Leon Czolgosz shoots U.S. President William McKinley at the Pan-American Exposition in Buffalo, New York. McKinley dies 8 days later.
- September 7 – The Boxer Rebellion in Qing dynasty China officially ends with the signing of the Boxer Protocol.
- September 14 – Vice President Theodore Roosevelt becomes the 26th president of the United States, upon President William McKinley's death.
- September 28 – Philippine–American War: Balangiga massacre: Filipino guerrillas kill more than forty United States soldiers in a surprise attack in the town of Balangiga.

=== October ===
- October 2 – The British Royal Navy's first submarine, Holland 1, is launched at Barrow-in-Furness.
- October 4 – The American yacht Columbia defeats the British Shamrock in the America's Cup yachting race in New York.
- October 24 – Michigan schoolteacher Annie Edson Taylor goes over Niagara Falls in a barrel and survives.
- October 29
  - Leon Czolgosz is executed in the electric chair for the assassination of William McKinley in Buffalo, New York on September 6.
  - In Amherst, New York, nurse Jane Toppan is arrested for murdering the Davis family of Boston with an overdose of morphine; she will confess to at least 31 killings.

=== November ===
- November 1 – The Sigma Phi Epsilon college fraternity is founded in Richmond, Virginia.
- November 9 – Rachmaninoff's Piano Concerto No. 2 is premiered in Moscow with the composer playing the solo part.
- November 14 – 1901 Caister lifeboat disaster: a life-boat capsizes on service on the east coast of England during a great storm; nine of the twelve crew on board are killed. This gives ride to the lifeboatmen's motto "Never turn back."
- November 15 – The Alpha Sigma Alpha fraternity is founded at Longwood University in Farmville, Virginia.
- November 18 – The Hay–Pauncefote Treaty is signed by the United Kingdom and United States, allowing the U.S. to build the Panama Canal under its sole control.
- November 25 – Auguste Deter is first examined by German psychiatrist Dr. Alois Alzheimer, leading to a diagnosis of the condition that will carry Alzheimer's name.

=== December ===
- December 3
  - U.S. President Theodore Roosevelt delivers a 20,000-word speech to the United States House of Representatives asking Congress to curb the power of trusts "within reasonable limits".
  - The Immigration Restriction Act 1901 is passed by the new Parliament of Australia as the basis of a White Australia policy.
- December 10 – The first Nobel Prize ceremony is held in Stockholm, on the fifth anniversary of Alfred Nobel's death.
- December 12 – Guglielmo Marconi receives the first trans-Atlantic radio signal, sent from Poldhu, England, to St. John's, Newfoundland; it is the letter "S" in Morse code.
- December 20 – The final spike is driven into the Mombasa–Victoria–Uganda Railway, in modern-day Kisumu, Kenya.

=== Date unknown ===
- The okapi is observed for the first time by Europeans (previously known only to African natives).
- New Zealand inventor Ernest Godward invents the spiral hairpin.
- German engineer Richard Fiedler invents the modern flamethrower, the Kleinflammenwerfer.
- American businessman William S. Harley draws up plans for his first prototype motorcycle.
- AB Lux, as the predecessor of Electrolux, founded in Sweden.
- American retail pharmacy Walgreens is founded in Chicago.
- The Intercollegiate Prohibition Association is established in Chicago.
- The Bulgarian Women's Union is founded.
- Splošno slovensko žensko društvo , the first women's organisation in Slovenia, is founded.

== Births ==
=== January ===
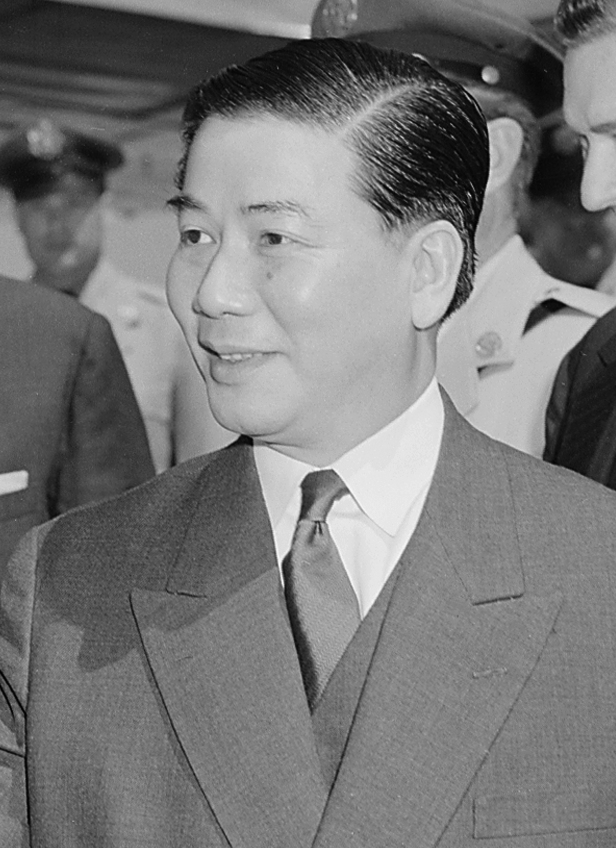
Ngô Đình Diệm

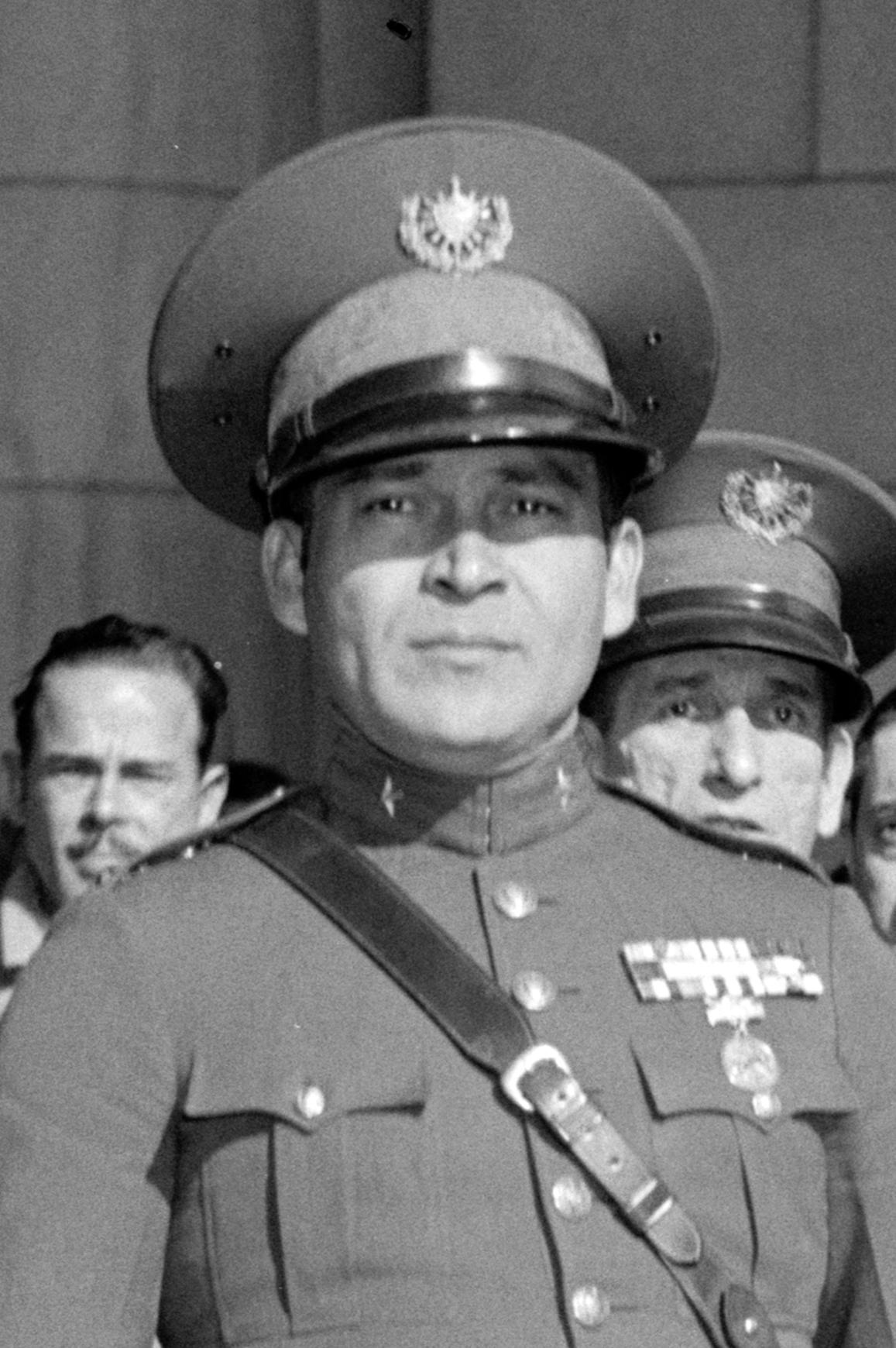
Fulgencio Batista

- January 1 – George of Drama, Greek Orthodox priest, elder and saint (d. 1959)
- January 3 – Ngô Đình Diệm, 1st President of South Vietnam (d. 1963)
- January 4 – C. L. R. James, Trinidad-born writer, journalist (d. 1989)
- January 7 – Teodora Fracasso, Italian Roman Catholic religious professed (d. 1927)
- January 9 – Vilma Bánky, Hungarian-born American actress (d. 1991)
- January 10 – Henning von Tresckow, German Wehrmacht Major General (d. 1944)
- January 11 – Kwon Ki-ok, Korean pilot (d. 1988)
- January 13
  - A. B. Guthrie Jr., American novelist and historian (d. 1991)
  - Wilhelm Hanle, German physicist (d. 1993)
- January 14
  - Bebe Daniels, American actress (d. 1971)
  - Alfred Tarski, Polish logician and mathematician (d. 1983)
- January 16 – Fulgencio Batista, Cuban leader (d. 1973)
- January 17 – Susana Calandrelli, Argentine writer and teacher (d. 1978)
- January 22 – Alberto Hurtado, Chilean Jesuit priest and saint (d. 1952)
- January 25 – Mildred Dunnock, American actress (d. 1991)
- January 27 – Art Rooney, American football team owner (d. 1988)
- January 29 – E. P. Taylor, Canadian business tycoon (d. 1989)
- January 30
  - Samir Al-Rifai, 9th Prime Minister of Jordan (d. 1965)
  - Rudolf Caracciola, German race car driver (d. 1959)

=== February ===
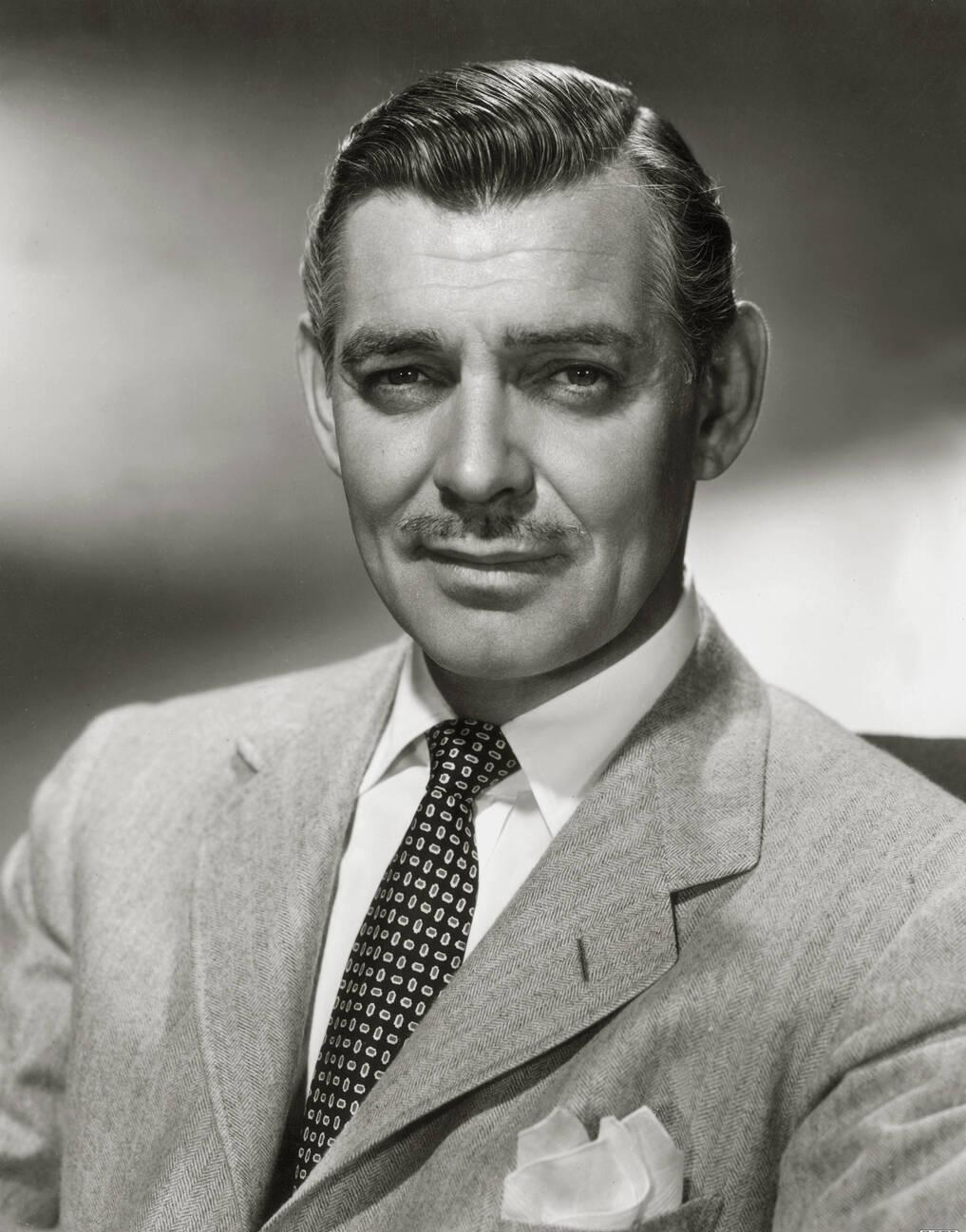
Clark Gable

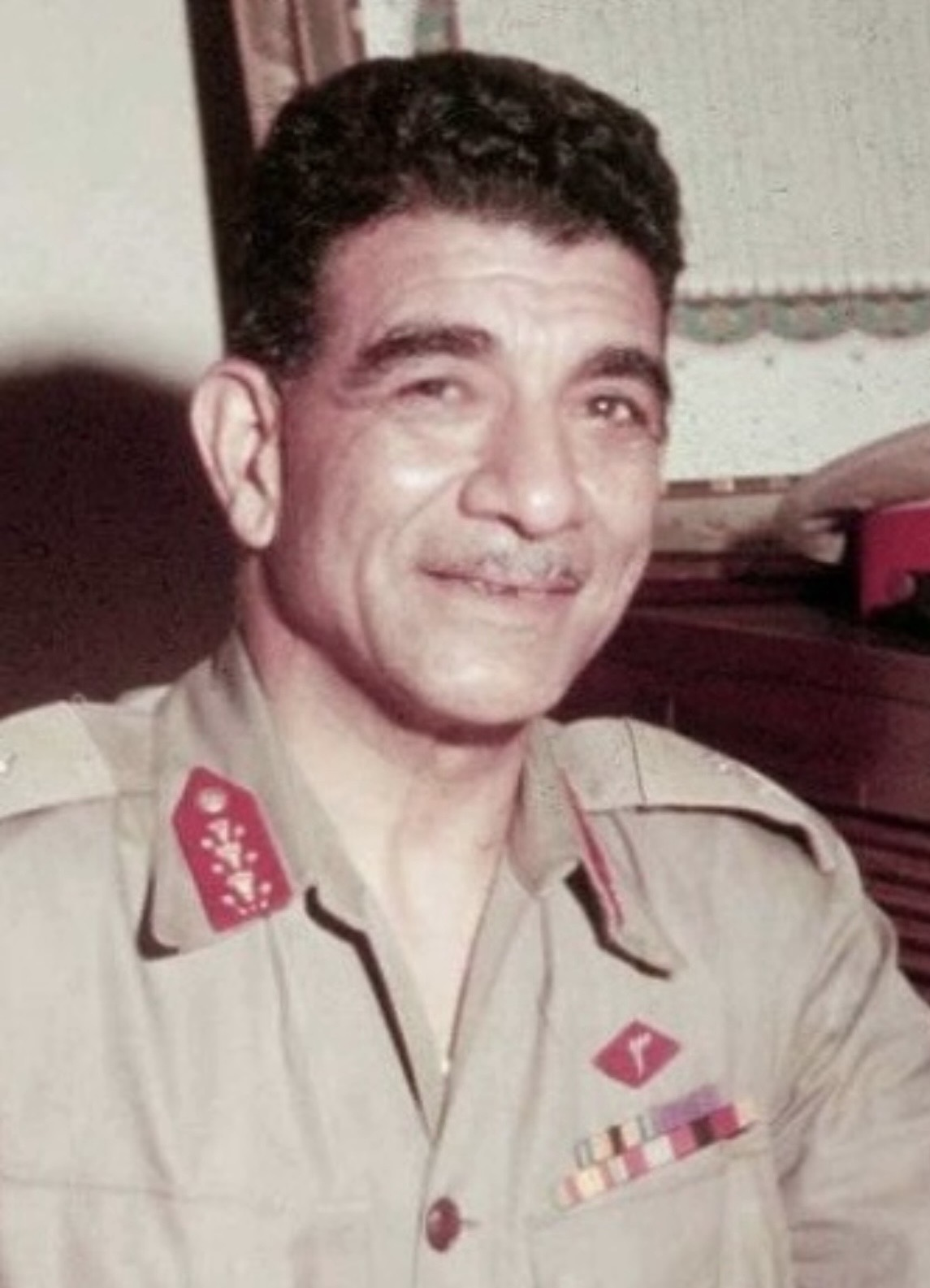
Mohamed Naguib

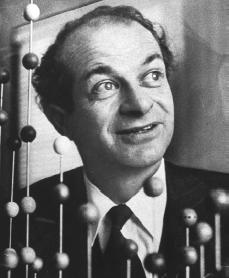
Linus Pauling

- February 1
  - Frank Buckles, last surviving American veteran of World War I (d. 2011)
  - Clark Gable, American actor (d. 1960)
  - Langston Hughes, African-American writer (d. 1967)
- February 2 – Jascha Heifetz, Lithuanian violinist (d. 1987)
- February 3 – Arvid Wallman, Swedish diver (d. 1982)
- February 9
  - Brian Donlevy, American actor (d. 1972)
  - Sebastiaan Matheus Sigismund de Ranitz, Dutch jurist and Nazi collaborator (d. 1987)
- February 10 – Stella Adler, American actress, acting teacher (d. 1992)
- February 15 – Kenneth Callow, British biochemist (d. 1983)
- February 16 – Chester Morris, American actor (d. 1970)
- February 20 – Mohammed Naguib, 30th Prime Minister of Egypt and 1st President of Egypt (d. 1984)
- February 25 – Zeppo Marx, American comedian (d. 1979)
- February 28 – Linus Pauling, American chemist, recipient of the Nobel Prize in Chemistry and Peace (d. 1994)

=== March ===
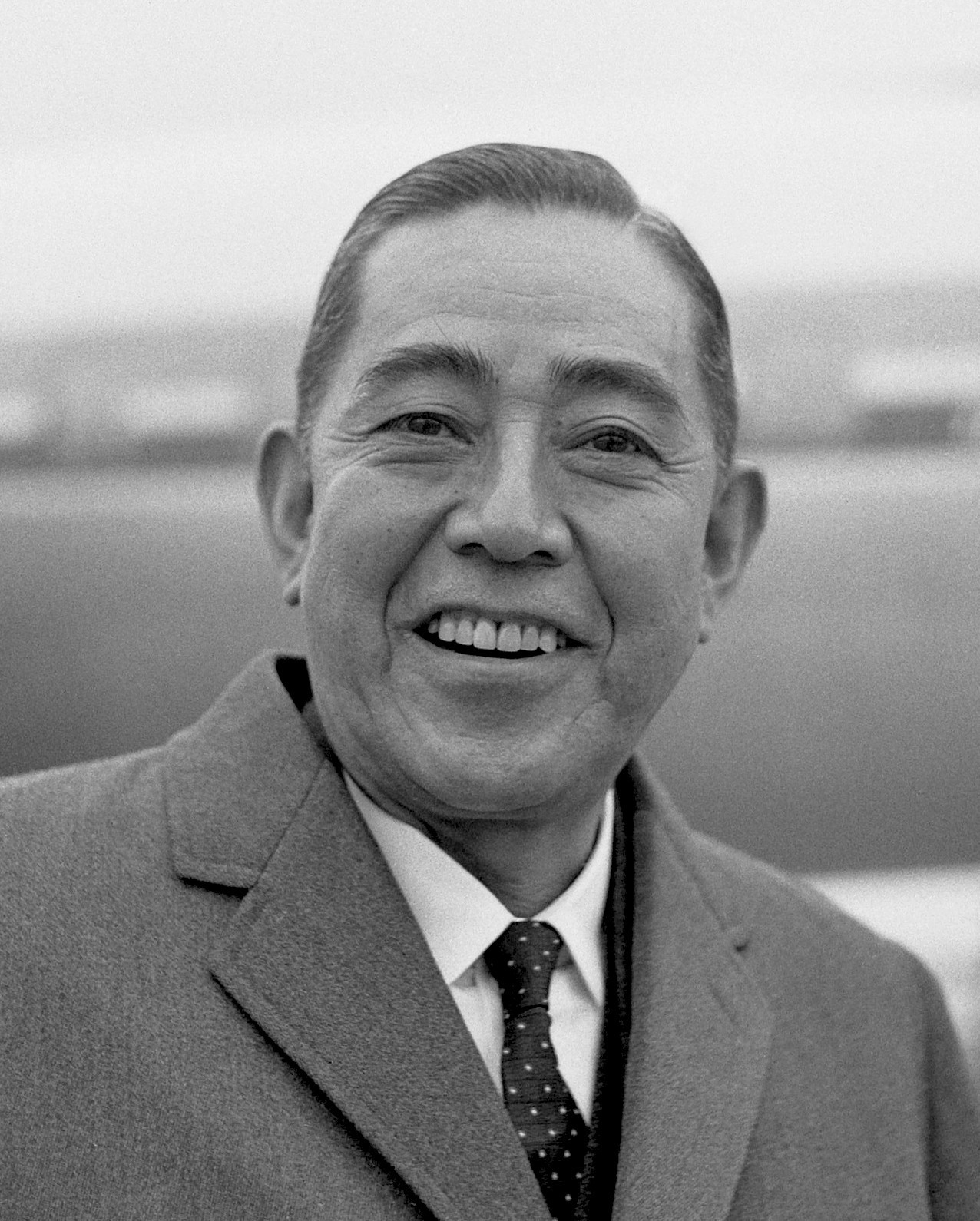
Eisaku Satō

- March 3 – Claude Choules, British World War I veteran, last surviving combat veteran from any nation (d. 2011)
- March 4 – Jean-Joseph Rabearivelo, Malagasy poet (d. 1937)
- March 13 – Paul Fix, American actor (d. 1983)
- March 23 – Bhakti Hridaya Bon, Indian guru, religious writer (d. 1982)
- March 24 – Ub Iwerks, American cartoonist (d. 1971)
- March 25 – Ed Begley, American actor (d. 1970)
- March 26 – Teresa Demjanovich, American Roman Catholic religious professed and blessed (d. 1927)
- March 27
  - Carl Barks, American cartoonist, screenwriter (d. 2000)
  - Enrique Santos Discépolo, Argentine tango, milonga musician and composer (d. 1951)
  - Eisaku Satō, Prime Minister of Japan, recipient of the Nobel Peace Prize (d. 1975)
  - Kenneth Slessor, Australian poet (d. 1971)

=== April ===
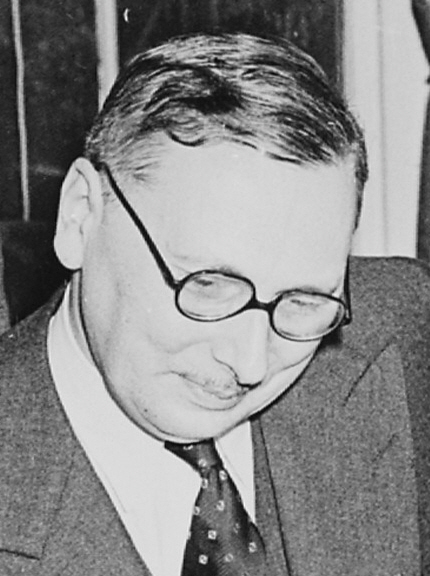
René Pleven

Emperor Hirohito

- April 1 – Whittaker Chambers, American spy (d. 1961)
- April 5 – Melvyn Douglas, American actor (d. 1981)
- April 6 – Pier Giorgio Frassati, Italian Catholic youth leader and socialist.(d.1925)
- April 13 – Jacques Lacan, French psychoanalyst, psychiatrist (d. 1981)
- April 15
  - Joe Davis, English snooker, billiards player (d. 1978)
  - René Pleven, prime minister of France (d. 1993)
- April 16 – Lajos Dinnyés, 41st prime minister of Hungary (d. 1961)
- April 29 – Hirohito, Emperor of Japan (d. 1989)
- April 30 – Simon Kuznets, Ukrainian-born American economist, Nobel Prize laureate (d. 1985)

=== May ===
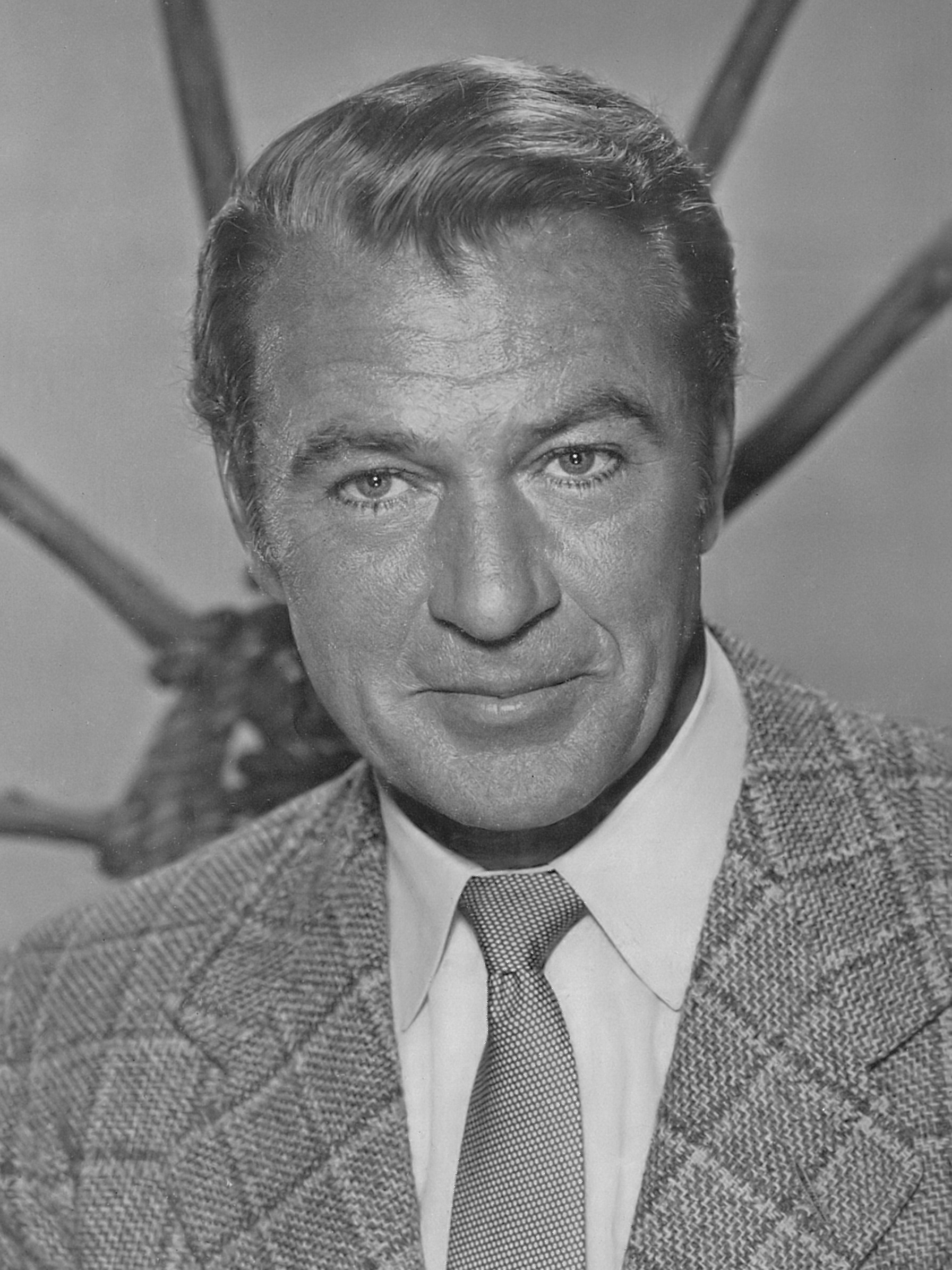
Gary Cooper

- May 3 – Gino Cervi, Italian actor (d. 1974)
- May 7 – Gary Cooper, American actor (d. 1961)
- May 11 – Rose Ausländer, German poet (d. 1988)
- May 13 – Witold Pilecki, Polish resistance leader (executed 1948)
- May 17 – Werner Egk, German composer (d. 1983)
- May 18 – Vincent du Vigneaud, American chemist, Nobel Prize laureate (d. 1978)
- May 20 – Max Euwe, Dutch chess player (d. 1981)
- May 21
  - Horace Heidt, American bandleader (d. 1986)
  - Suzanne Lilar, Belgian essayist, novelist and playwright (d. 1992)
- May 30 – Mieczysław Fogg, Polish singer and artist (d. 1990)
- May 31 – Alfredo Antonini, Italian-born American conductor and composer (d. 1983)

=== June ===
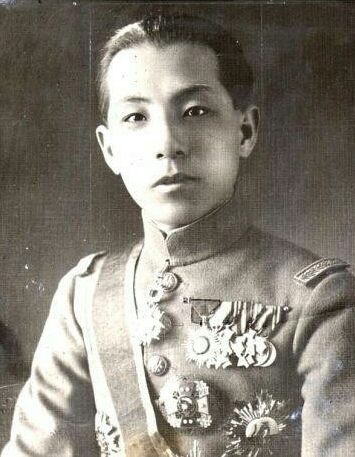
Zhang Xueliang

Sukarno

- June 1 – Tom Gorman, Australian rugby league footballer (d. 1978)
- June 3 – Zhang Xueliang, Chinese military leader (d. 2001)
- June 6 – Sukarno, 1st president of Indonesia (d. 1970)
- June 7 – Hugo Ballivián, Bolivian military officer, 44th President of Bolivia (d. 1993)
- June 13 – Tage Erlander, Swedish politician, 25th prime minister of Sweden (d. 1985)
- June 16 – Henri Lefebvre, French Marxist philosopher, sociologist (d. 1991)
- June 18
  - Grand Duchess Anastasia Nikolaevna of Russia (d. 1918)
  - Denis Johnston, Irish playwright (d. 1984)
- June 23 – Chuck Taylor, American basketball player, salesman (d. 1969)
- June 24
  - Marcel Mule, French saxophonist (d. 2001)
  - Harry Partch, American composer (d. 1974)
- June 26 – Stuart Symington, American politician (d. 1988)
- June 27 – Merle Tuve, American physicist (d. 1982)
- June 29 – Nelson Eddy, American singer, actor (d. 1967)

=== July ===
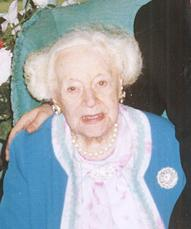
Barbara Cartland

- July 7
  - Vittorio De Sica, Italian actor and film director (d. 1974)
  - Eiji Tsuburaya, Japanese film director and special effects designer (d. 1970)
- July 9
  - Barbara Cartland, English novelist (d. 2000)
  - Frank Finnigan, Canadian ice hockey player (d. 1991)
- July 13 – Eric Portman, English actor (d. 1969)
- July 17 – Bruno Jasieński, Polish poet (d. 1938)
- July 24
  - Mabel Albertson, American actress (d. 1982)
  - Igor Ilyinsky, Soviet and Russian actor, comedian and director (d. 1987)
- July 28 – Rudy Vallée, American actor and jazz musician (d. 1986)
- July 31 – Jean Dubuffet, French painter (d. 1985)

=== August ===
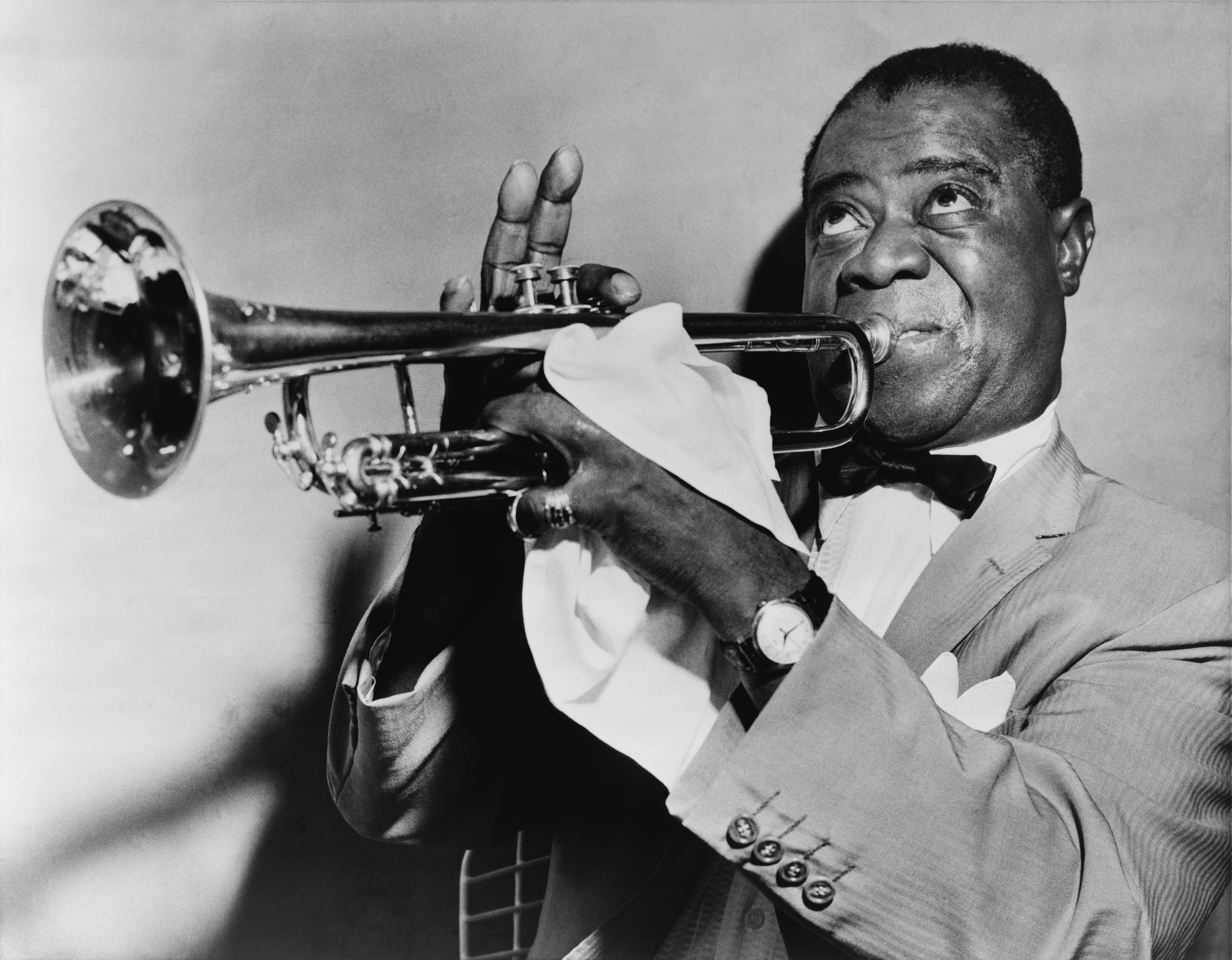
Louis Armstrong

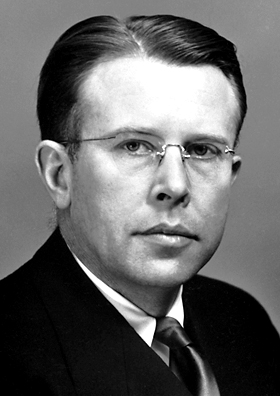
Ernest Lawrence

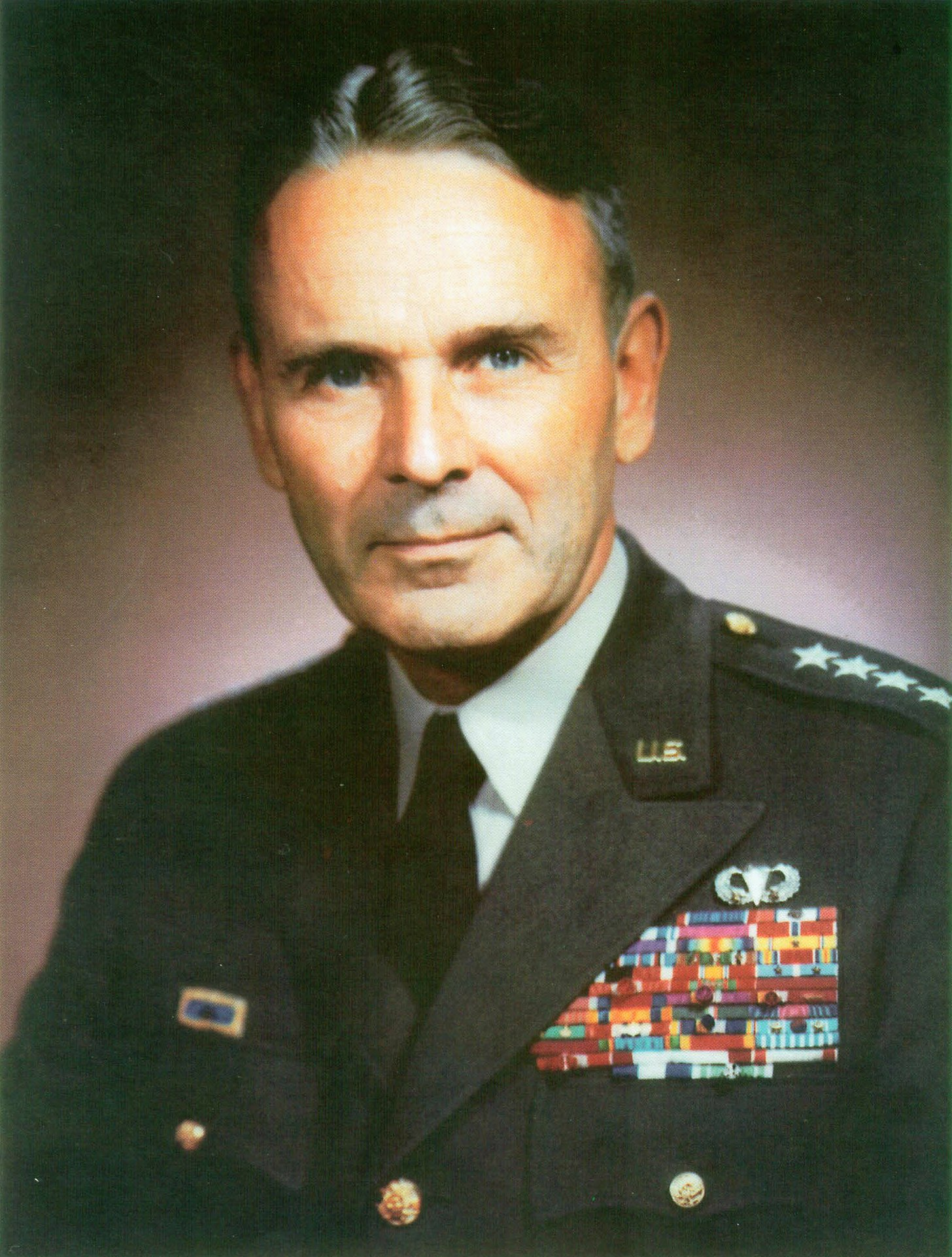
Maxwell D. Taylor

- August 1 – Pancho Villa, Filipino boxer (d. 1925)
- August 4 – Louis Armstrong, American jazz musician (d. 1971)
- August 8 – Ernest Lawrence, American physicist, Nobel Prize laureate (d. 1958)
- August 10 – Franco Dino Rasetti, Italian scientist (d. 2001)
- August 20 – Salvatore Quasimodo, Italian novelist, writer and Nobel Prize laureate (d. 1968)
- August 26
  - Maxwell D. Taylor, American general (d. 1987)
  - Chen Yi, Chinese military commander and politician (d. 1972)
  - Jan de Quay, Dutch politician, psychologist and 31st Prime Minister of the Netherlands (d. 1985)
- August 30
  - John Gunther, American writer (d. 1970)
  - Roy Wilkins, American civil rights activist (d. 1981)

=== September ===
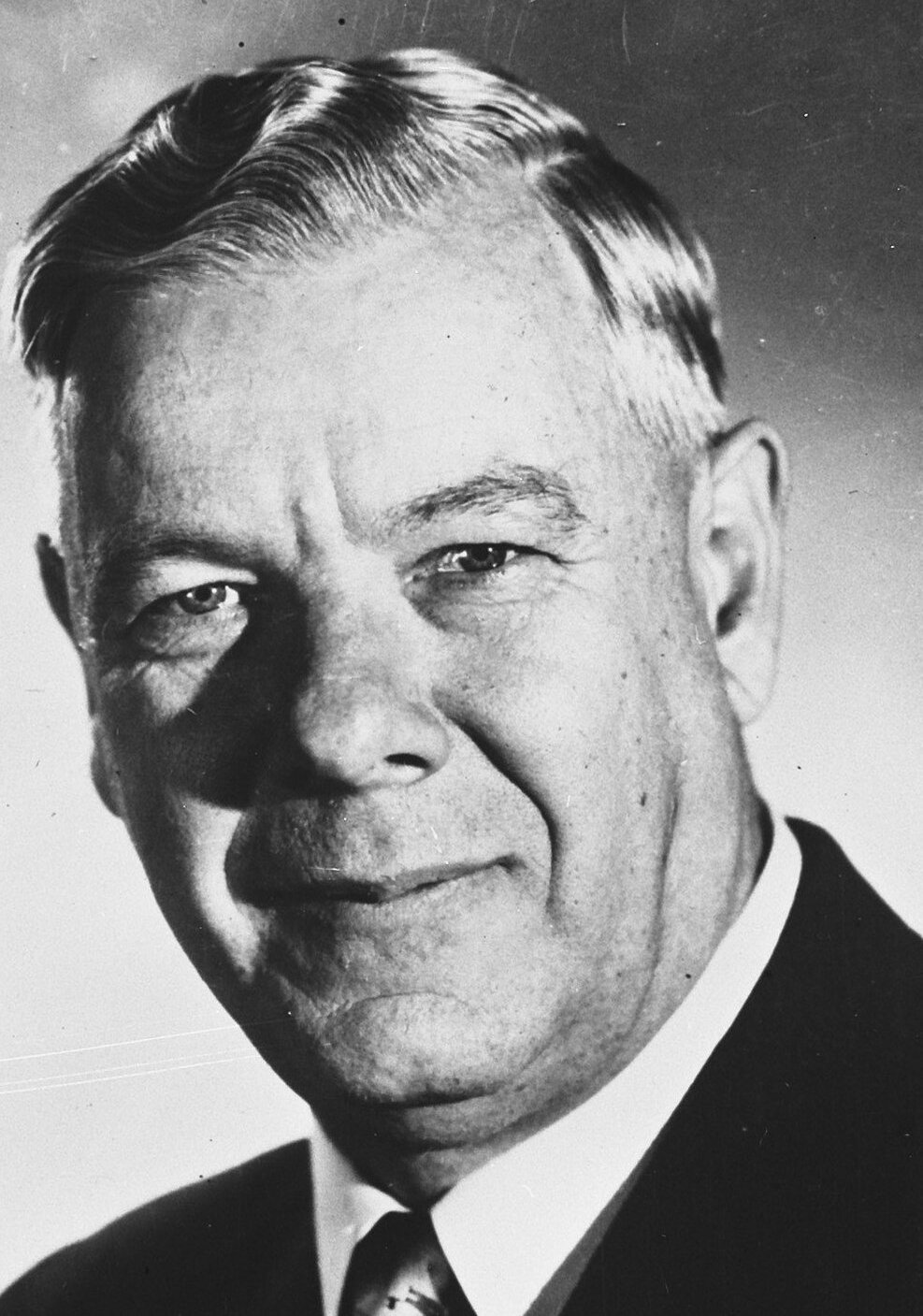
Hendrik Verwoerd

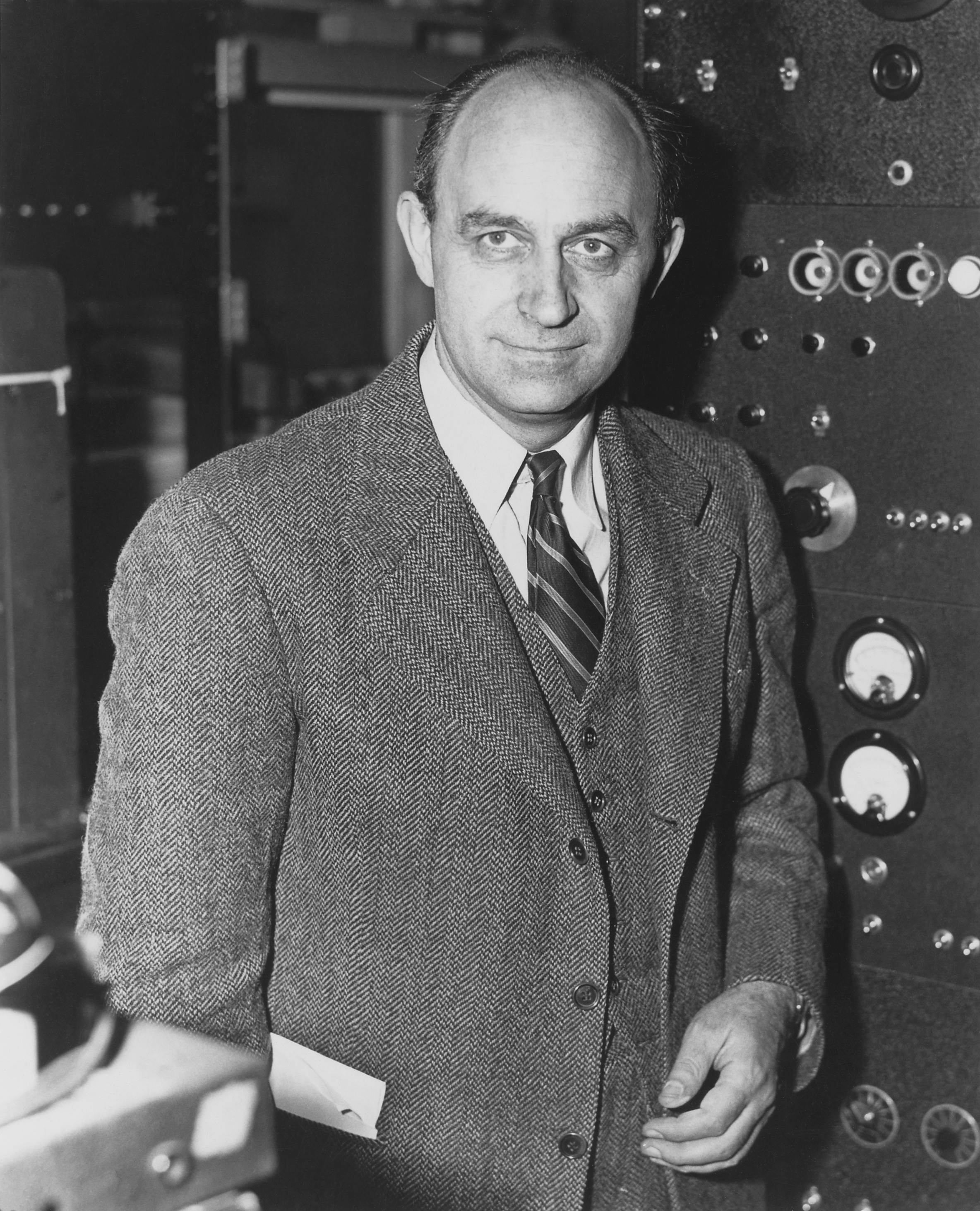
Enrico Fermi

- September 2
  - Andreas Embirikos, Greek poet (d. 1975)
  - Adolph Rupp, American college basketball coach (d. 1977)
- September 4 – William Lyons, British automobile engineer, designer (d. 1985)
- September 5 – Mario Scelba, 33rd prime minister of Italy (d. 1991)
- September 7 – Abdallah El-Yafi, 7-time prime minister of Lebanon (d. 1986)
- September 8 – Hendrik Verwoerd, 6th prime minister of South Africa (d. 1966)
- September 14 – Gulbrand Lunde, Norwegian chemist and politician, Nazi collaborator (d. 1942)
- September 15 – Sir Donald Bailey, British civil engineer (d. 1985)
- September 16 – Andrée Brunet, French pair skater (d. 1993)
- September 17 – Sir Francis Chichester, British sailor (d. 1972)
- September 21 – Learie Constantine, Trinidad-born cricketer and race relations campaigner (d. 1971)
- September 22 – Charles Brenton Huggins, Canadian-born cancer researcher, recipient of the Nobel Prize in Physiology or Medicine (d. 1997)
- September 23 – Jaroslav Seifert, Czech writer, Nobel Prize laureate (d. 1986)
- September 25 – Robert Bresson, French film director (d. 1999)
- September 26 – George Raft, American film actor (d. 1980)
- September 28
  - Ed Sullivan, American entertainer (d. 1974)
  - William S. Paley, American businessman, founder of CBS (d. 1990)
- September 29
  - Enrico Fermi, Italian physicist, Nobel Prize laureate (d. 1954)
  - Lanza del Vasto, Italian philosopher, poet, and activist (d. 1981)

=== October ===
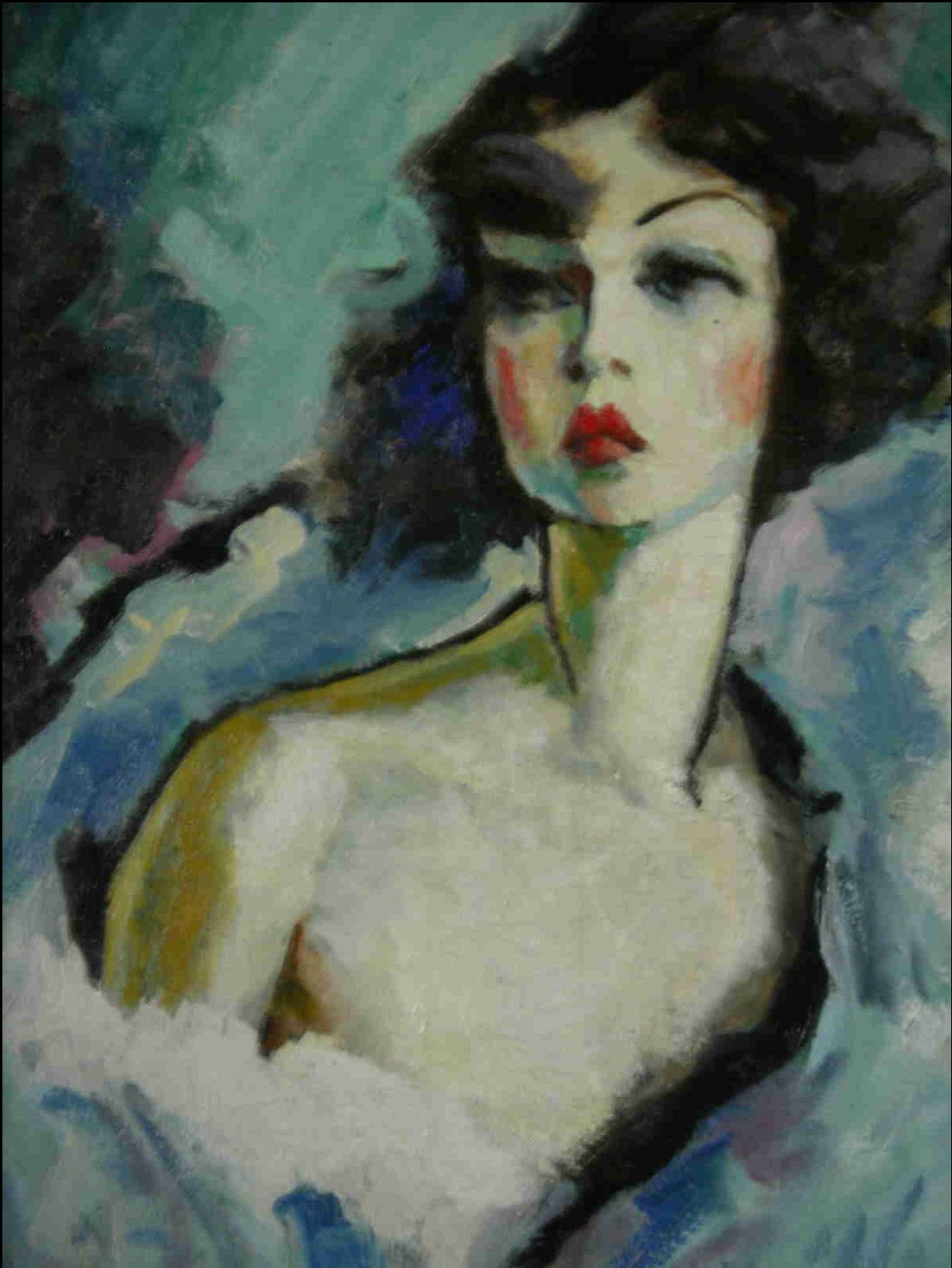
Alice Prin

- October 2 – Alice Prin, French singer (d. 1953)
- October 10 – Alberto Giacometti, Swiss sculptor and painter (d. 1966)
- October 19 – Arleigh Burke, American admiral (d. 1996)
- October 20 – Adelaide Hall, American jazz singer, entertainer (d. 1993)
- October 22 – Wijeyananda Dahanayake, 5th prime minister of Sri Lanka (d. 1997)
- October 29 – Georges Moulène, French footballer (d. 1985)

=== November ===
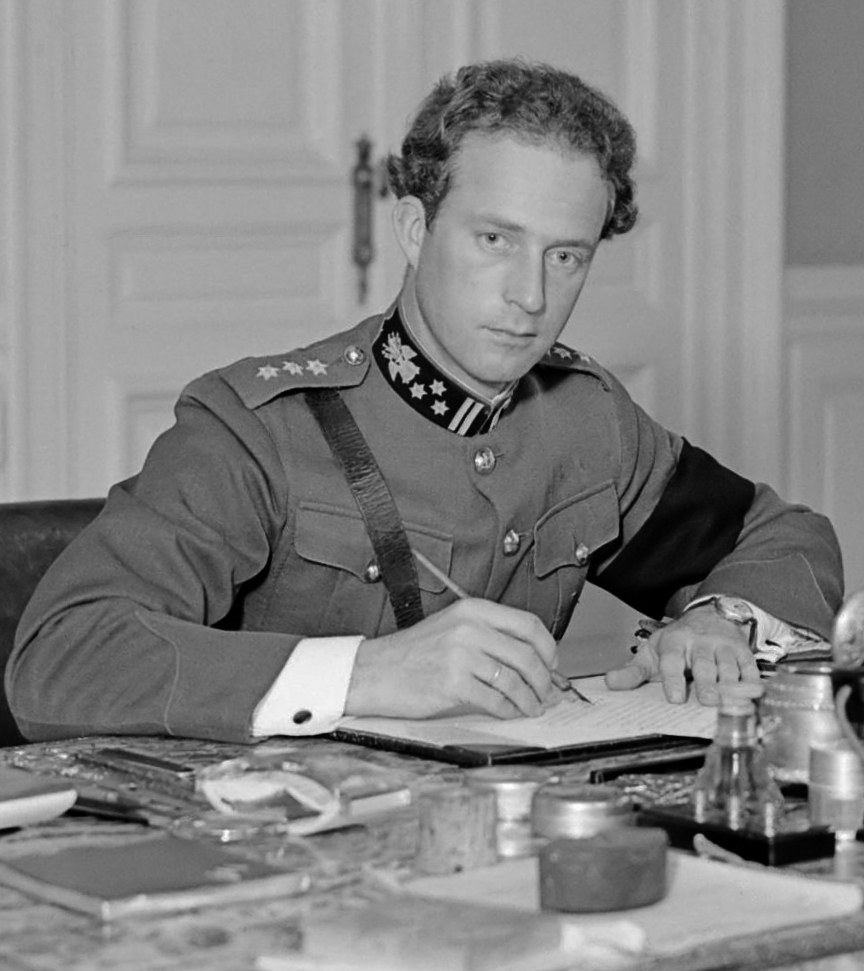
Leopold III of Belgium

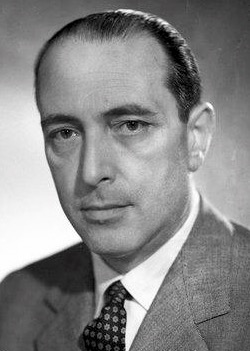
Fernando Tambroni

- November 2 – James Dunn, American actor (d. 1967)
- November 3
  - Prithviraj Kapoor, Indian actor and director (d. 1972)
  - Leopold III of Belgium (d. 1983)
- November 4 – Yi Bangja, Crown Princess of Korea (d. 1989)
- November 8 – Xu Xiangqian, Communist military leader in the People's Republic of China, defense minister (d. 1990)
- November 11
  - Helen Reichert, American broadcaster and educator (d. 2011)
  - Magda Goebbels, wife of German Propaganda Minister Joseph Goebbels (d. 1945)
- November 17 – Lee Strasberg, Polish-born American actor, acting teacher and co-founder of method acting (d. 1982)
- November 18 – George Gallup, American statistician, opinion pollster (d. 1984)
- November 22
  - Lee Patrick, American actress (d. 1982)
  - Joaquín Rodrigo, Spanish composer (d. 1999)
- November 25 – Fernando Tambroni, Italian politician, 36th Prime Minister of Italy (d. 1963)
- November 28
  - Roy Urquhart, British general (d. 1988)
  - Max Wagner, Mexican-born American film actor (d. 1975)
- November 29 – Mildred Harris, American actress (d. 1944)

=== December ===
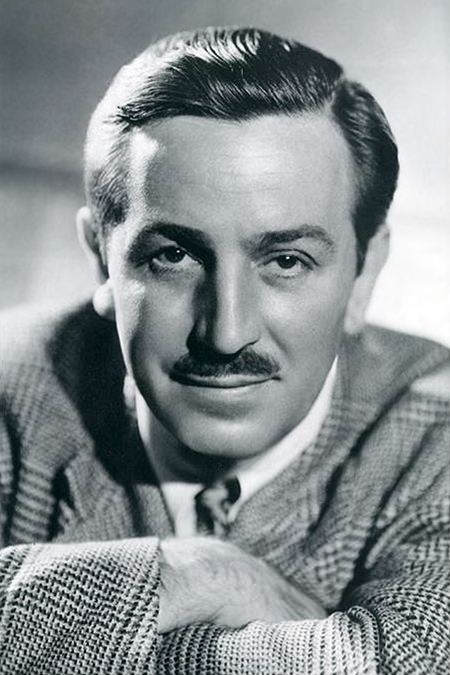
Walt Disney

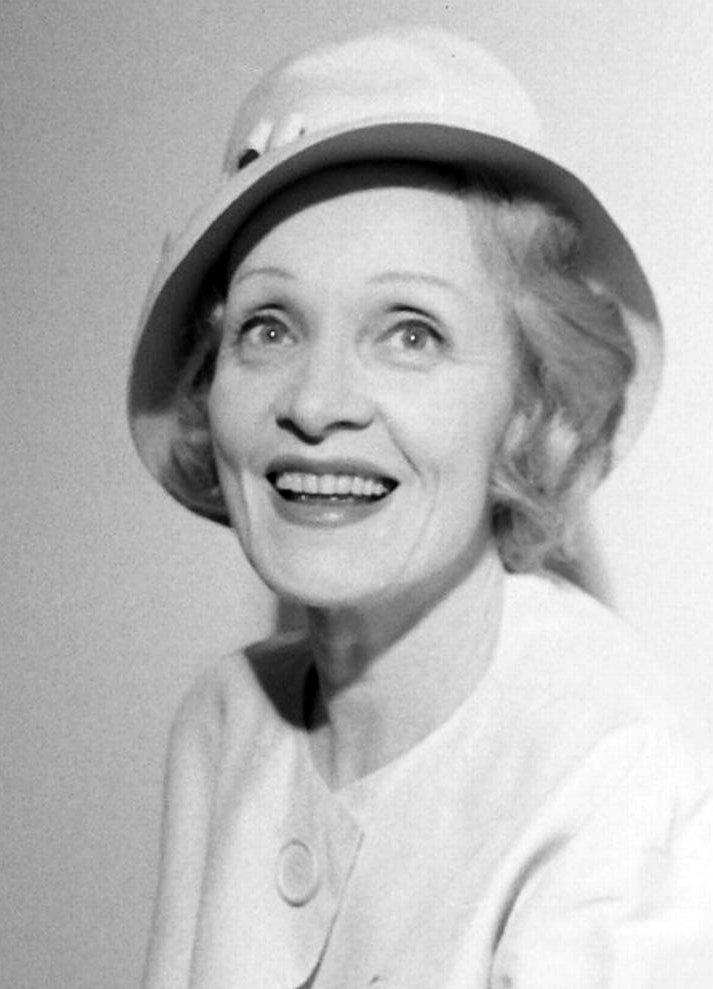
Marlene Dietrich

- December 5
  - Walt Disney, American animator, film producer (d. 1966)
  - Milton Erickson, American psychiatrist (d. 1980)
  - Werner Heisenberg, German physicist, Nobel Prize laureate (d. 1976)
- December 9 – Jean Mermoz, French aviator (d. 1936)
- December 16 – Margaret Mead, American cultural anthropologist (d. 1978)
- December 19 – Vitorino Nemesio, Portuguese poet and author (d. 1978)
- December 23 – Viktor Gutić, Croatian fascist official (d. 1947)
- December 25 – Princess Alice, Duchess of Gloucester (d. 2004)
- December 27 – Marlene Dietrich, German-American actress (d. 1992)
- December 31
  - Julia Bathory, Hungarian glass designer (d. 2000)
  - Karl-August Fagerholm, Prime Minister of Finland (d. 1984)

== Deaths ==
=== January–February ===
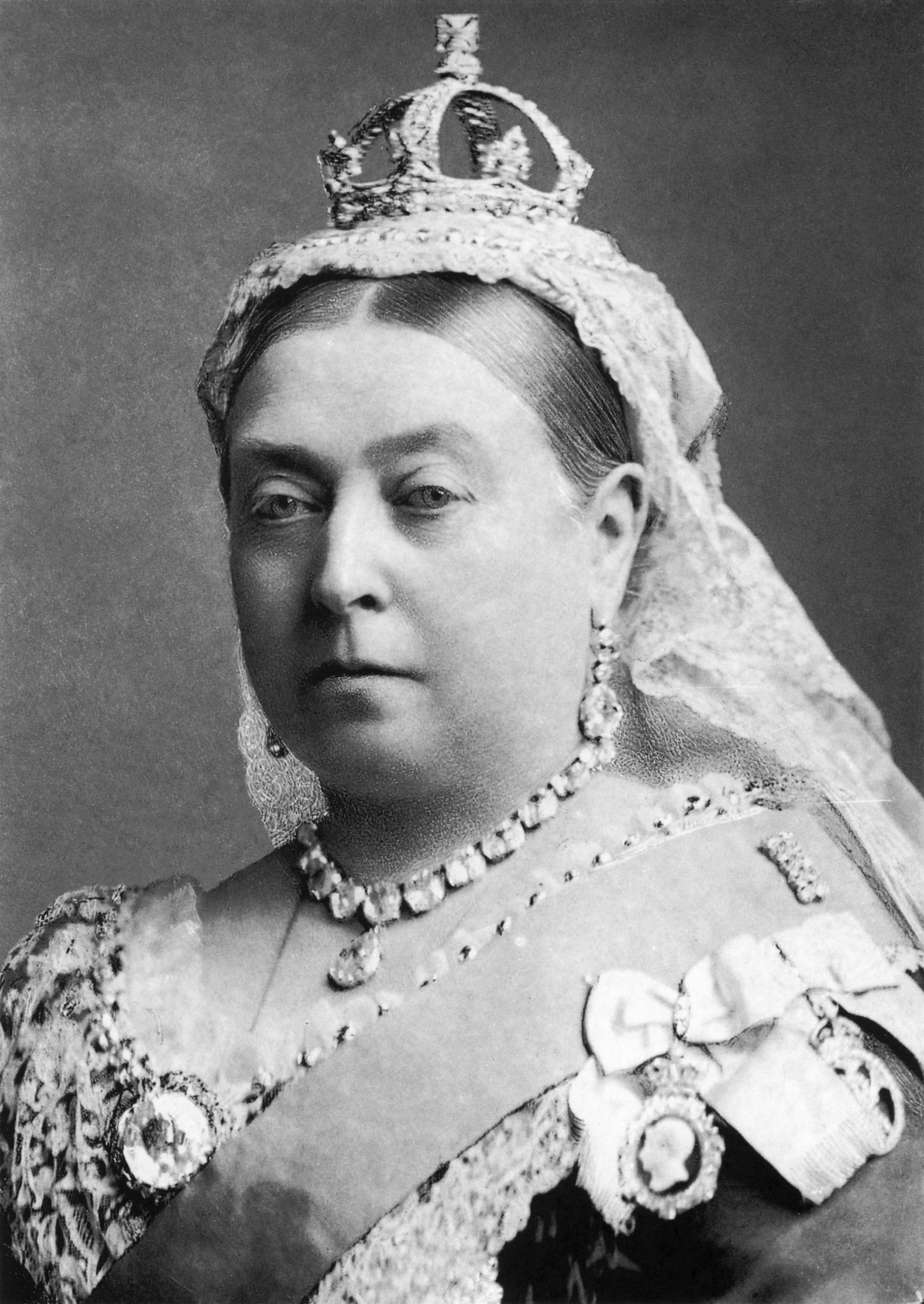
Queen Victoria

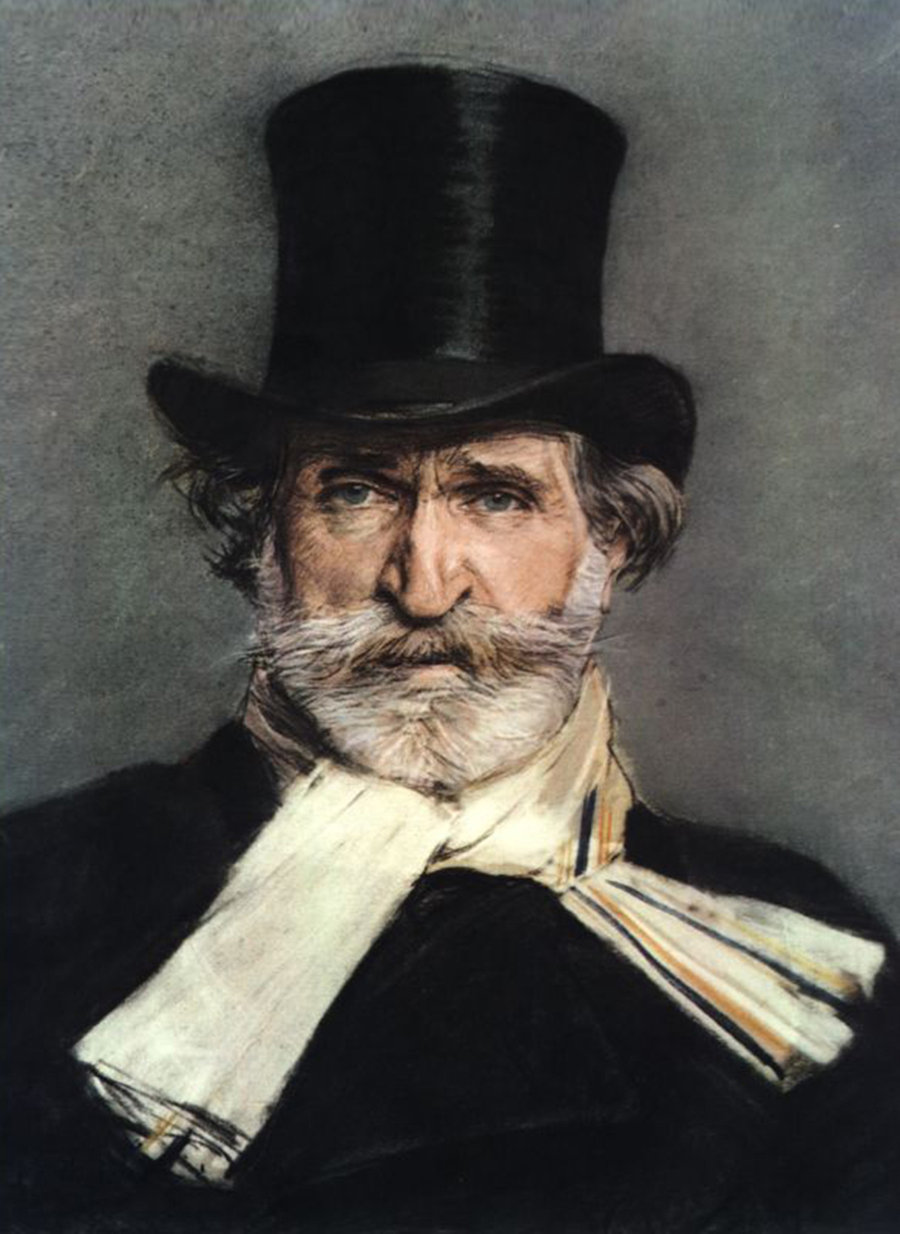
Giuseppe Verdi

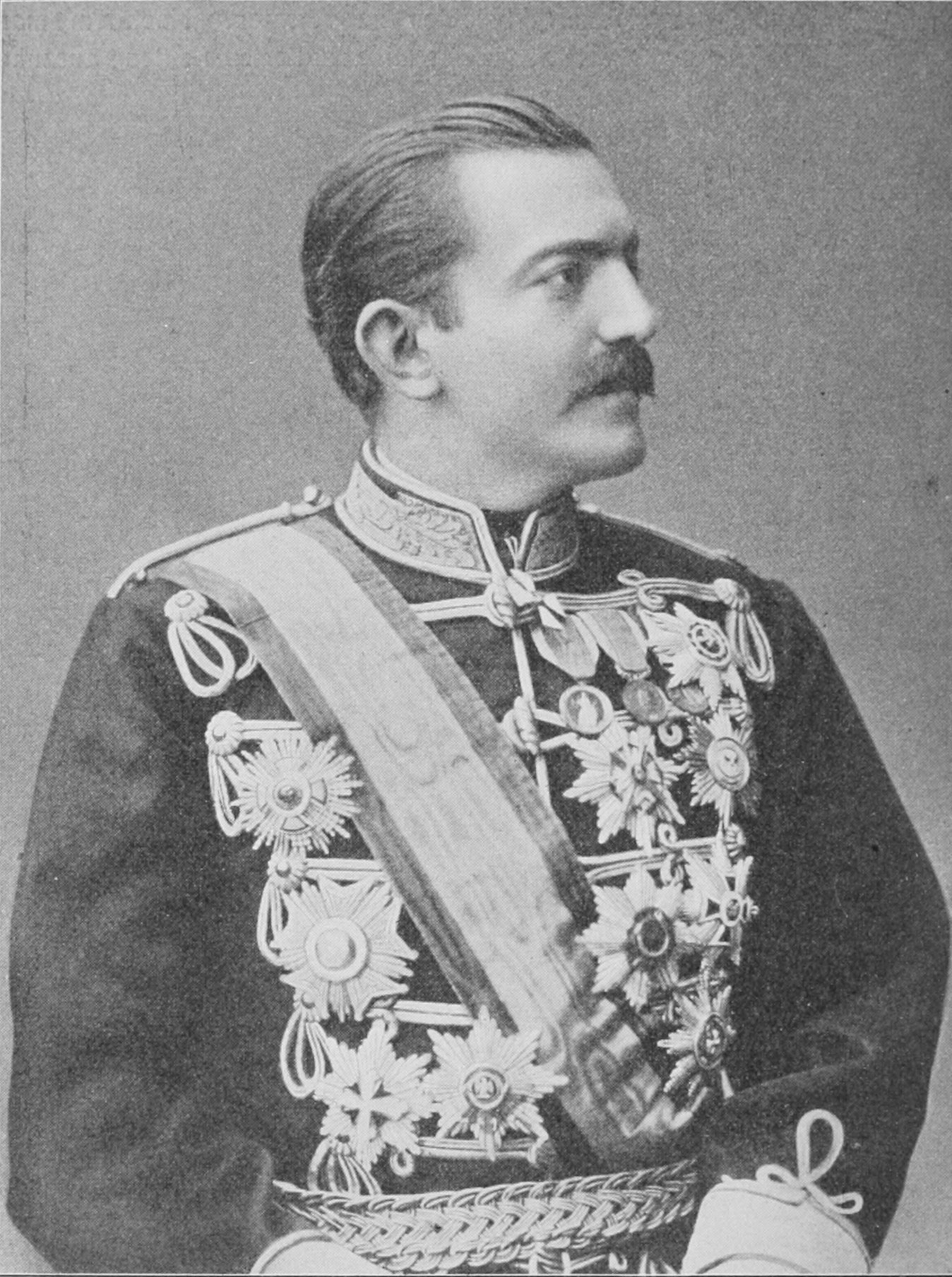
King Milan of Serbia

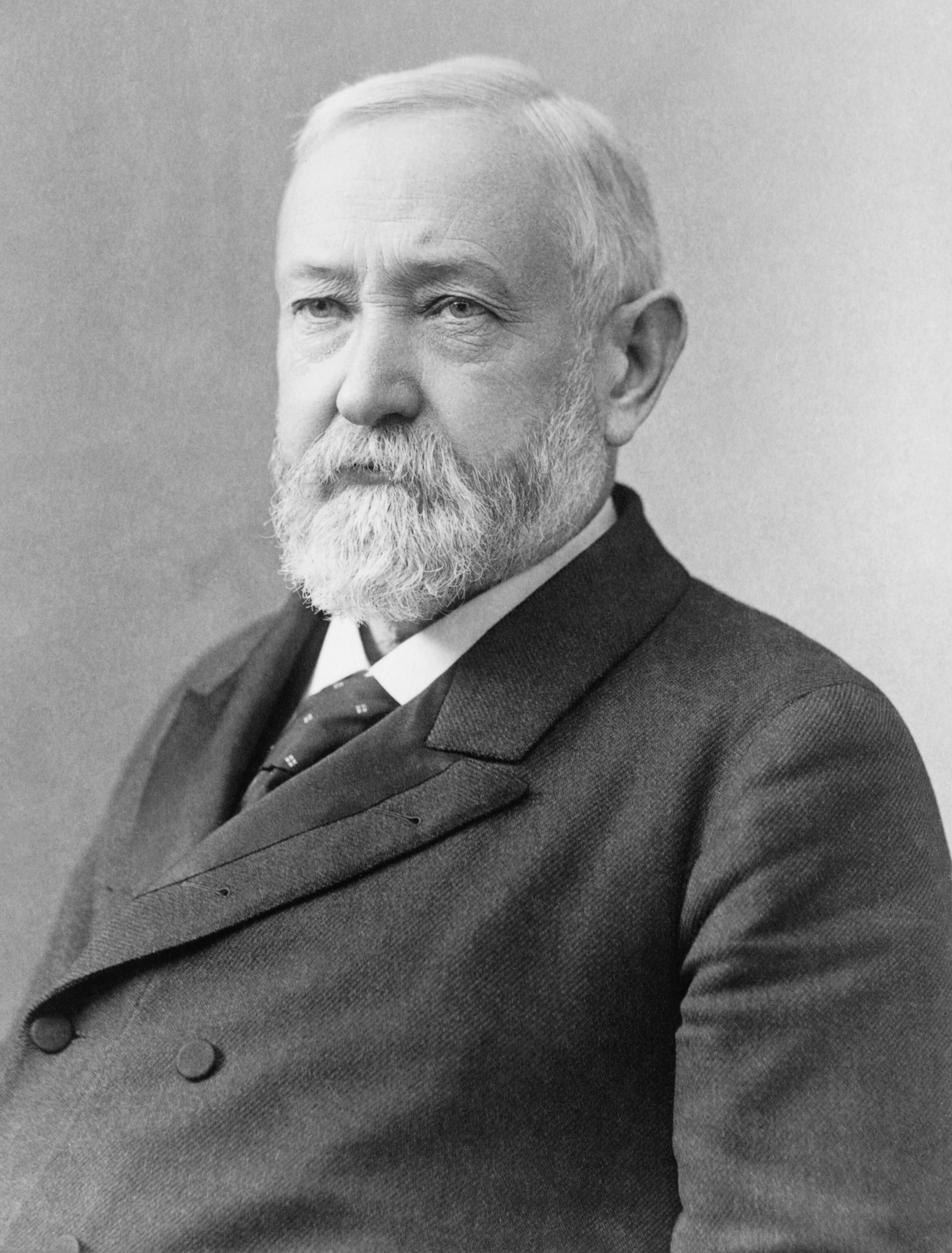
Benjamin Harrison

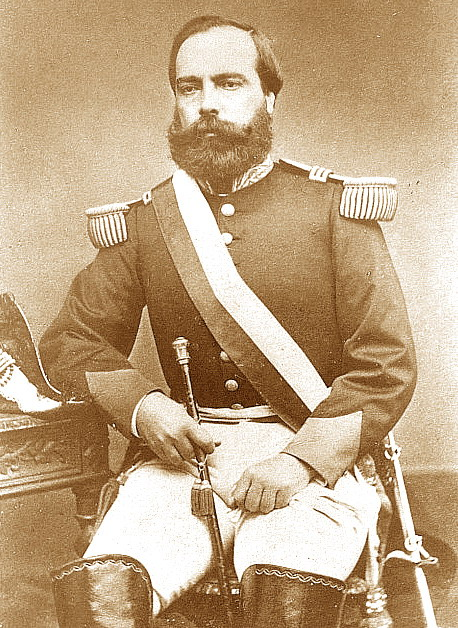
Mariano Ignacio Prado

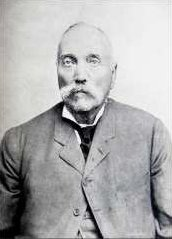
Marthinus Wessel Pretorius

- January 1 – Ignatius L. Donnelly, American politician and writer (b. 1831)
- January 8 – John Barry, Irish recipient of the Victoria Cross (b. 1873)
- January 10 – Sir James Dickson, Premier of Queensland, Australian Minister for Defence (b. 1832)
- January 11 – Vasily Kalinnikov, Russian composer (b. 1866)
- January 14 – Víctor Balaguer, Spanish politician, author (b. 1824)
- January 16
  - Arnold Böcklin, Swiss artist (b. 1827)
  - Mahadev Govind Ranade, Indian reformer (b. 1842)
- January 17
  - Leonard Fulton Ross, American Civil War general (b. 1823)
  - Frederic W. H. Myers, British poet and psychic researcher (b. 1843)
- January 19 – Albert, 4th duc de Broglie, French politician, 28th Prime Minister of France (b. 1821)
- January 21 – Elisha Gray, American inventor, appliance manufacturer (b. 1835)
- January 22 – Queen Victoria of the United Kingdom, Empress of India (b. 1819)
- January 27 – Giuseppe Verdi, Italian composer (b. 1813)
- January 28 – Iosif Gurko, Russian field marshal (b. 1828)
- February 7 – Ana Betancourt, Cuban national heroine (b. 1832)
- February 10 – Max von Pettenkofer, Bavarian chemist and hygienist (b. 1818)
- February 11
  - King Milan I of Serbia (b. 1854)
  - Ramón de Campoamor, Spanish poet (b. 1817)
- February 14 – Sir Edward Stafford, Scottish-New Zealand educator, politician and 3rd Prime Minister of New Zealand (b. 1819)
- February 22 – George Francis FitzGerald, Irish mathematician (b. 1851)
- February 26 – Lucyna Ćwierczakiewiczowa, Polish writer (b. 1829)

=== March–April ===
- March 13 – Benjamin Harrison, 23rd President of the United States (b. 1833)
- March 23 – Konstantin Stoilov, 8th Prime Minister of Bulgaria (b. 1853)
- March 31 – Sir John Stainer, British composer and organist (b. 1840)
- April 1 – François-Marie Raoult, French chemist (b. 1830)
- April 3 – Richard D'Oyly Carte, English impresario (b. 1844)
- April 9 – Shrimad Rajchandra, Indian Jain philosopher, scholar and poet, spiritual mentor of Mahatma Gandhi (b. 1867)
- April 24 – Arvid Posse, 2nd prime minister of Sweden (b. 1820)

=== May–June ===
- May 1 – Lewis Waterman, American inventor, businessman (b. 1837)
- May 4 – Fritz Mayer van den Bergh, Belgian art collector and art historian (b. 1858)
- May 5 – Mariano Ignacio Prado, Peruvian general and statesman, twice President of Peru (b. 1825)
- May 7 – Dimitar Grekov, 10th Prime Minister of Bulgaria (b. 1847)
- May 19 – Marthinus Wessel Pretorius, 1st President of South Africa (b. 1819)
- May 21 – Sir John Commerell, British admiral of the fleet (b. 1829)
- May 22 – Gaetano Bresci, Italian anarchist and assassin (b. 1869)
- May 24 – Charlotte Mary Yonge, English novelist (b. 1823)
- May 31 – Ernest de Sarzec, French archeologist (b. 1832)
- June 2 – George Leslie Mackay, Canadian missionary (b. 1844)
- June 4 – Charlotte Fowler Wells, American phrenologist (b. 1814)
- June 9
  - Walter Besant, English writer (b. 1836)
  - Adolf Bötticher, German art historian (b. 1842)
- June 13 – Leopoldo Alas, 'Clarín', Spanish novelist (b. 1852)
- June 16 – Herman Grimm, German historian (b. 1828)
- June 21 – Anthony Hoskins, British admiral (b. 1828)
- June 25 – Alexandru Candiano-Popescu, Romanian general, lawyer, journalist, and poet (b. 1841)

=== July–August ===
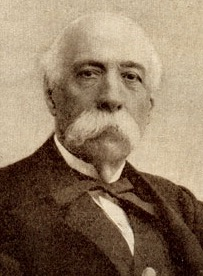
Francesco Crispi

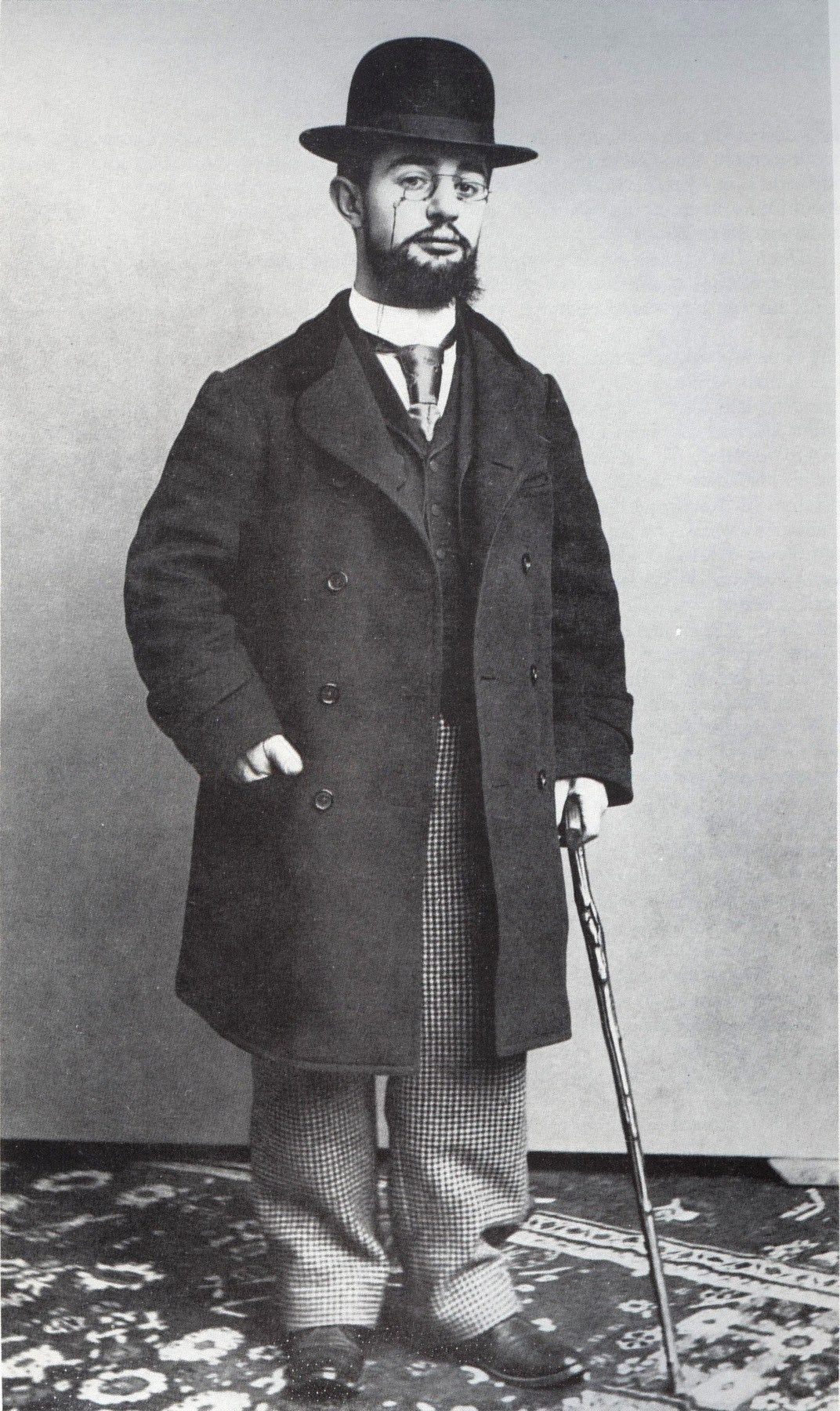
Henri de Toulouse-Lautrec

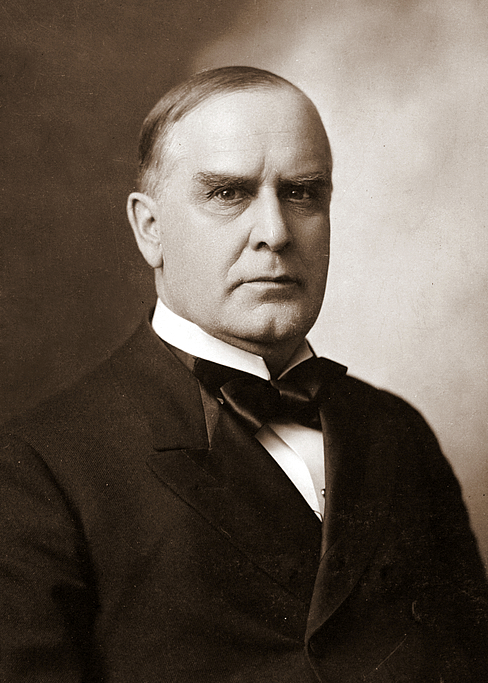
William McKinley

- July 4
  - John Fiske, American philosopher (b. 1842)
  - Johannes Schmidt, German linguist (b. 1843)
- July 6
  - Chlodwig, Prince of Hohenlohe-Schillingsfürst, Chancellor of Germany (b. 1819)
  - Joseph LeConte, American physician and geologist (b. 1823)
- July 7 – Johanna Spyri, Swiss writer (b. 1827)
- July 10 – Kliment of Tarnovo, 2nd Prime Minister of Bulgaria (b. 1841)
- July 11 – Marietta Bones, American suffragist, social reformer, philanthropist (b. 1842)
- July 18 – Jan ten Brink, Dutch writer (b. 1834)
- August 5 – Victoria, Princess Royal (b. 1840)
- August 12
  - Francesco Crispi, 11th Prime Minister of Italy (b. 1819)
  - Adolf Erik Nordenskiöld, Finnish-Swedish botanist, geologist, mineralogist, and explorer (b. 1832)
- August 19 – Shō Tai, last king of the Ryūkyū Kingdom in Japan (b. 1843)
- August 21 – Adolf Eugen Fick, German-born physician and physiologist (b. 1829)

=== September–October ===
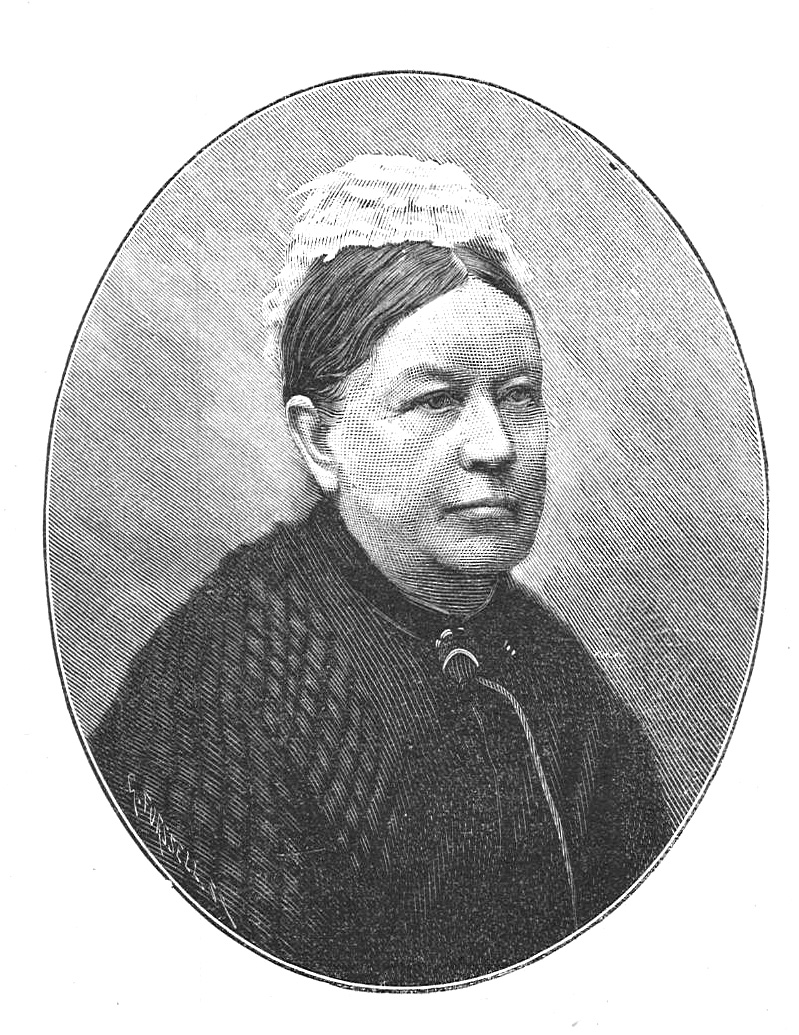
Emanuella Carlbeck

- September 9 – Henri de Toulouse-Lautrec, French painter (b. 1864)
- September 10 – Emanuella Carlbeck, Swedish educator and social reformer (b. 1829)
- September 14 – William McKinley, 25th President of the United States (assassinated) (b. 1843)
- September 15 – Sir Joseph Palmer Abbott, Australian politician and solicitor (b. 1842)
- September 25 – Sir Arthur Fremantle, British army general (b. 1835)
- October 1 – Abdur Rahman Khan, Emir of Afghanistan (b. 1844)
- October 10 – Lorenzo Snow, 5th president of The Church of Jesus Christ of Latter-day Saints (b. 1814)
- October 15 – Carlos María Fitz-James Stuart, 16th Duke of Alba, Spanish aristocrat (b. 1849)
- October 19 – Carl Frederik Tietgen, Danish financier, industrialist (b. 1829)
- October 28 – Paul Rée, German author and philosopher (b. 1849)
- October 29
  - Leon Czolgosz, Polish-American assassin of U.S. President William McKinley (executed) (b. 1873)
  - John Kemp Starley, English bicycle inventor (b. 1854)

=== November–December ===
- November 7 – Li Hongzhang, Chinese general (b. 1823)
- November 13 – Sir William Stewart, British admiral (b. 1822)
- November 27 – Clement Studebaker, American manufacturer (b. 1831)
- November 29 – Francisco Pi y Margall, Spanish politician, former president of the Republic (b. 1824)
- November 30 – Edward John Eyre, English explorer, Governor of Jamaica (b. 1815)
- December 6 – Bertha Wehnert-Beckmann, German photographer (b. 1815)
- December 11 – Lev Ivanov, Russian choreographer (b. 1834)

== Nobel Prizes ==

- Physics – Wilhelm Conrad Röntgen
- Chemistry – Jacobus Henricus van 't Hoff
- Medicine – Emil Adolf von Behring
- Literature – Sully Prudhomme
- Peace – Jean Henri Dunant and Frédéric Passy

== Significance of 1901 for software ==
The date of Friday December 13 20:45:52 1901 is significant for modern computers because it is the earliest date representable with a signed 32-bit integer on systems that reference time in seconds since the Unix epoch. This corresponds to −2147483648 seconds from Thursday January 1 00:00:00 1970. Software that depends on this representation cannot represent an earlier date.

Similarly, many computer systems suffer from the year 2038 problem, when the positive number of seconds since 1970 exceeds 2147483647 (01111111 11111111 11111111 11111111 in binary) and, if represented as a signed 32-bit integer, wraps to −2147483648, representing Friday December 13 20:45:52 1901. In a way, the year 2038 problem for using signed 32-bit integers with January 1, 1970, as the zero date is as the year 2000 problem was for software using two-digit decimal integers with January 1, 1900, as the zero date.
