= Susana Calandrelli =

Argentine writer and teacher

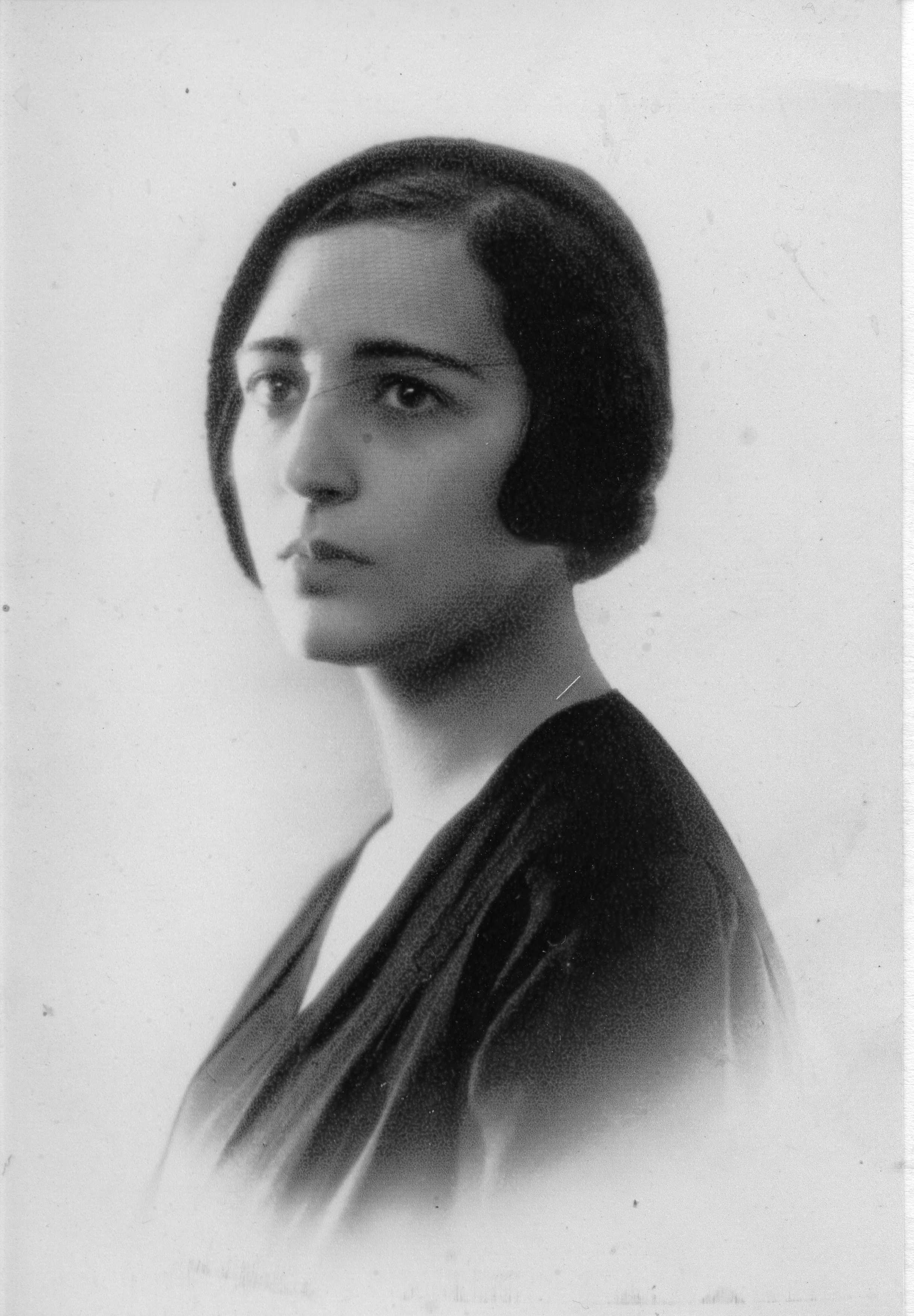
Susana Calandrelli, ca. 1920, Argentina writer, Calandrelli's family archives

Susana Calandrelli (January 17, 1901 – July 21, 1978) was an Argentine writer and teacher.

== Biography ==
Born in Buenos Aires, Argentina, Calandrelli wrote everything from poetry, stories, novels to essays, plays, lectures and textbooks. She participated in several different cultural institutions and directed the Escuela de Servicio Social del Insituto de Cultura Religiosa Superior. She specialized in graphology and characterology, giving courses covering such material. In 1918 she received a gold medal for her work A los muertos ignorados and an award of honor for La libertad from the Académie des Jeux Floraux in Languedoc in both Spanish and French. She also collaborated in the Buenos Aires-based La Nación, La Prensa, El Hogar and other newspapers and magazines, publishing many books. Her works were appreciated by foreign audiences as well and she and her work were mentioned in several encyclopedias and anthologies in London, New York, and throughout Europe and the Americas. Some of Calandrelli's poems formed part of the Antología de la Poesía Argentina Moderna (1896-1930) by Julio Noé. Among the other featured poets were Jorge Luis Borges, Leopoldo Marechal, Ricardo Güiraldes, Oliverio Girondo, Luis Cané, Leopoldo Lugones and Alfonsina Storni.

== Published works ==
- Carillons dans l’ombre, poésie en français, Buenos Aires, Imprimerie Fontana, 1921.
- Al trasluz de las horas, Buenos Aires, Imp. Rodríguez Giles, 1925.
- Cuentos alucinados, La Plata, Olivieri y Dominguez, 1932.
- Curso moderno de geografía elemental, Buenos Aires, Kapelusz, 1932, Premio de la provincia de Buenos Aires. 2da ed. 1938.
- El manuscrito de Silvia Gallus, Buenos Aires, Tor, 1934.
- Si usted fuera Flavio, play heard on Radio Nacional around 1930.
- El rumor del mundo, Victoria, Buenos Aires, Argentina, Ed. Serviam, 1937.
- Breve vida de N.S. Jesucristo: el evangelio, Buenos Aires, Emmanuel, 1939.
- La palabra que no se pronuncia [prologue by Carlos Obligado], Buenos Aires, Comisión Argentina de Publicaciones e Intercambio, 1939.
- Vida de N.S. Jesucristo, para niños, Buenos Aires, Editorial San Jorge, 1939.
- La Vida de Jesús, Buenos Aires, Ediciones Sagradas.
- Cuentos de Navidad, Buenos Aires, Comisión Argentina de Publicaciones, 1940.
- Nociones de Geografía general y Argentina: 3° y 4° grados, Buenos Aires, Kapelusz, 1940.
- Los ojos vacíos, Buenos Aires, Nuestra Novela N*11, 1941.
- Nuevo curso de historia argentina, 2da ed. Buenos Aires, Kapelusz, 1941.
- Maggy, de Edouard Martial Lekeux, translation from French by S. Calandrelli, Buenos Aires, Caritas, 1942; Ed. Pax et Bonum, 1946.
- Andresito y Periquito, Children's stories, Buenos Aires, 1943.
- El tesoro escondido, Children's stories, Buenos Aires, 1943.
- El Dios desconocido, History of the times of Christ, novel, Buenos Aires, Emecé, 1948.
- Madre, Libro de Lectura para 4to Grado, Buenos Aires, Editorial Luis Laserre, 1955.
- Martín Fierro, Synthesis of the poetry by Martín Fierro, Buenos Aires, Ed. San Jorge, 1957, 1966, 1978.
- El reloj de ébano, Buenos Aires, Ediciones de Koperva. 1962; Premio de la Sociedad Argentina de Escritores, 1963.
- Leyendas cristianas de Navidad, Buenos Aires, Ed. San Jorge. 1963. Premio de la Municipalidad de Buenos Aires.
- El otro sol, stories, 1964.
- La verdad y el sueño, Buenos Aires, Lib.Huemul, 1964.
- Angeles en el evangelio, Buenos Aires, Ed. Paulinas, 1967.
- Los animales en el evangelio, Buenos Aires, Ed. Paulinas, 1967.
- Parábolas del evangelio, Buenos Aires, Ed. Paulinas, 1967.
- Pecadores del evangelio, Buenos Aires, Ed. Paulinas, 1967.
- Personajes de la pasión, Buenos Aires, Ed. Paulinas, 1967.
- Soldados del evangelio, Buenos Aires, Ed. Paulinas, 1967.
- A la sombra del gran templo, Buenos Aires, 1968. Premio de la Asociación de Escritoras Católicas, 1971.
- Ese planeta llamado locura, Prologue by Alfredo Cahn, Buenos Aires, Ediciones de Koperva, 1969. Premio de la Asociación de Escritoras Católicas, 1971.
- El chango del Altiplano, novel, Ed. Abril SA. (Huemul, 1971, 1975, 1977).
- La Gloria, 16 Argentine stories, Anthology of Argentine writers, (one story by S. Calandrelli: La Gloria), Buenos Aires, Huemul, 1971.

- Conducted children's auditions, La hora infantil. Formed part of the staff of Radio Stentor, considered The Fairy of Radio Stentor 1933.
- Her play was broadcast in three acts on Radio Nacional : Si usted fuera Flavio.
- She directed and produced Blanca nieves y el Príncipe azul, unedited film, 1945.
