= Splošno slovensko žensko društvo =

Slovenian women's rights organization

Splošno slovensko žensko društvo (SŽD) (English:General Women's Society) was a Slovenian organisation for women's rights, founded in 1901 and discontinued in 1945. It was the first women's rights organisation in Slovenia.

It was founded by Franja Tavčar and Josipine Widmar. Its purpose was to work for women's access to higher education and professional work, but also for women's suffrage.

It was one of the first, as well as one of the most lengthy and dominating women's associations in Slovenia prior to WWII.

The SZD was founded by a group of liberal women on Ljubljana, who had the wish to create a ‘comprehensive organisation of Slovene women for the purpose of woman's education, the raising of her social and economic position and the defence of her interests’. It campaigned for an improvement in women's educational, economical and social rights. It was also a philanthropic organization.

The SZD was a part of the Bund Österreichischer Frauenvereine when Slovenia belonged to Austria, and became a part of the Jugoslavenski Zhenski Savez when Slovenia became a part of Yugoslavia, as a representantive of Slovenia's women's movement.
