= List of people from Košice =

This is a list of notable people from Košice, Slovakia

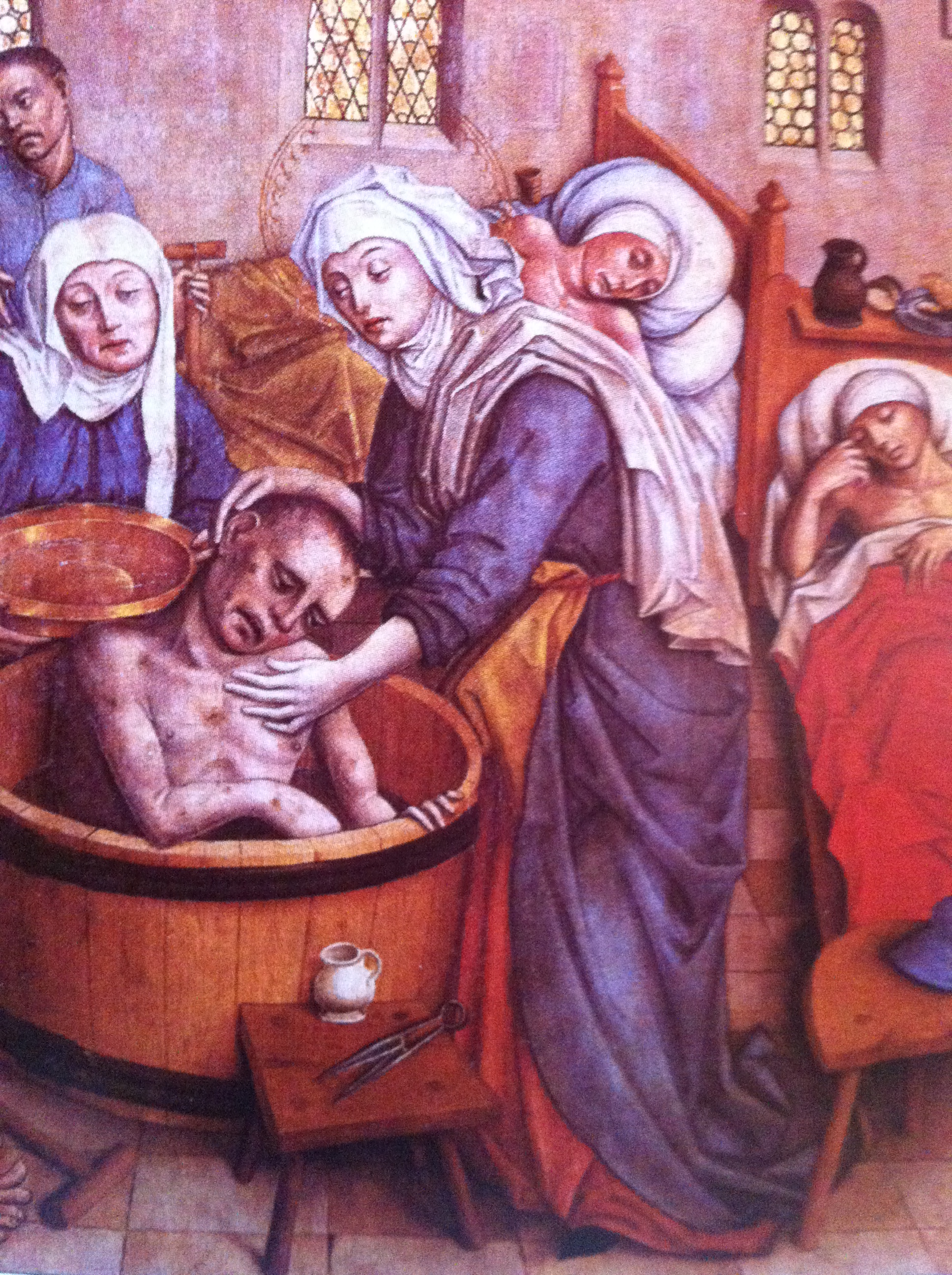
Elizabeth of Hungary (1207–1231), patron saint of Košice

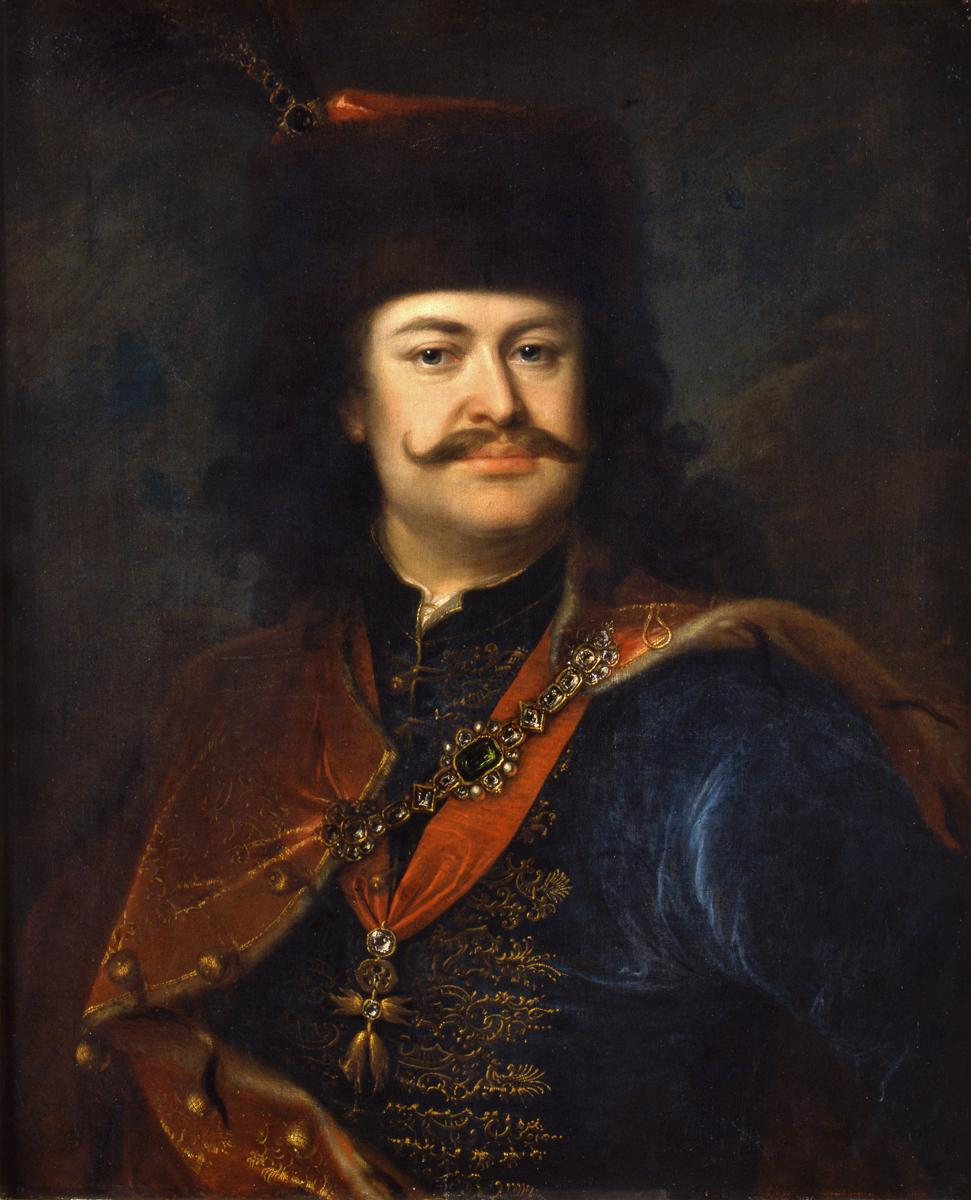
Francis II Rákóczi (1676–1735), Hungarian nobleman

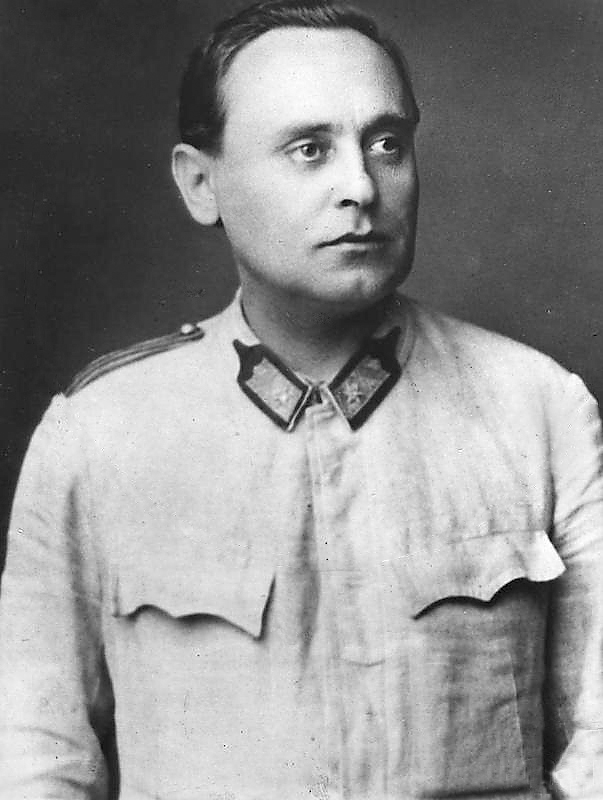
Ferenc Szálasi (1897–1946), fascist head of state of Hungary at end of WW2

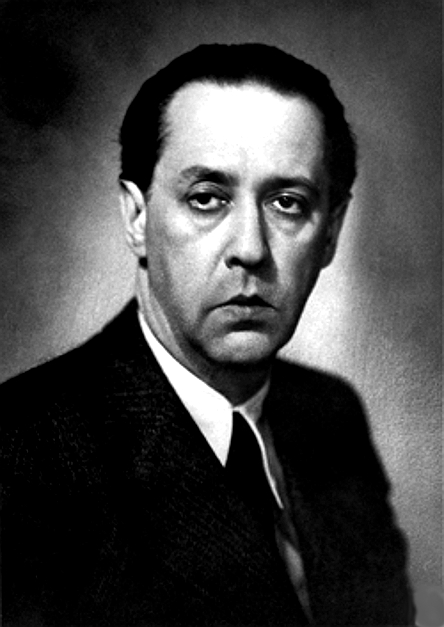
Sándor Márai (1900–1989), Hungarian writer and journalist

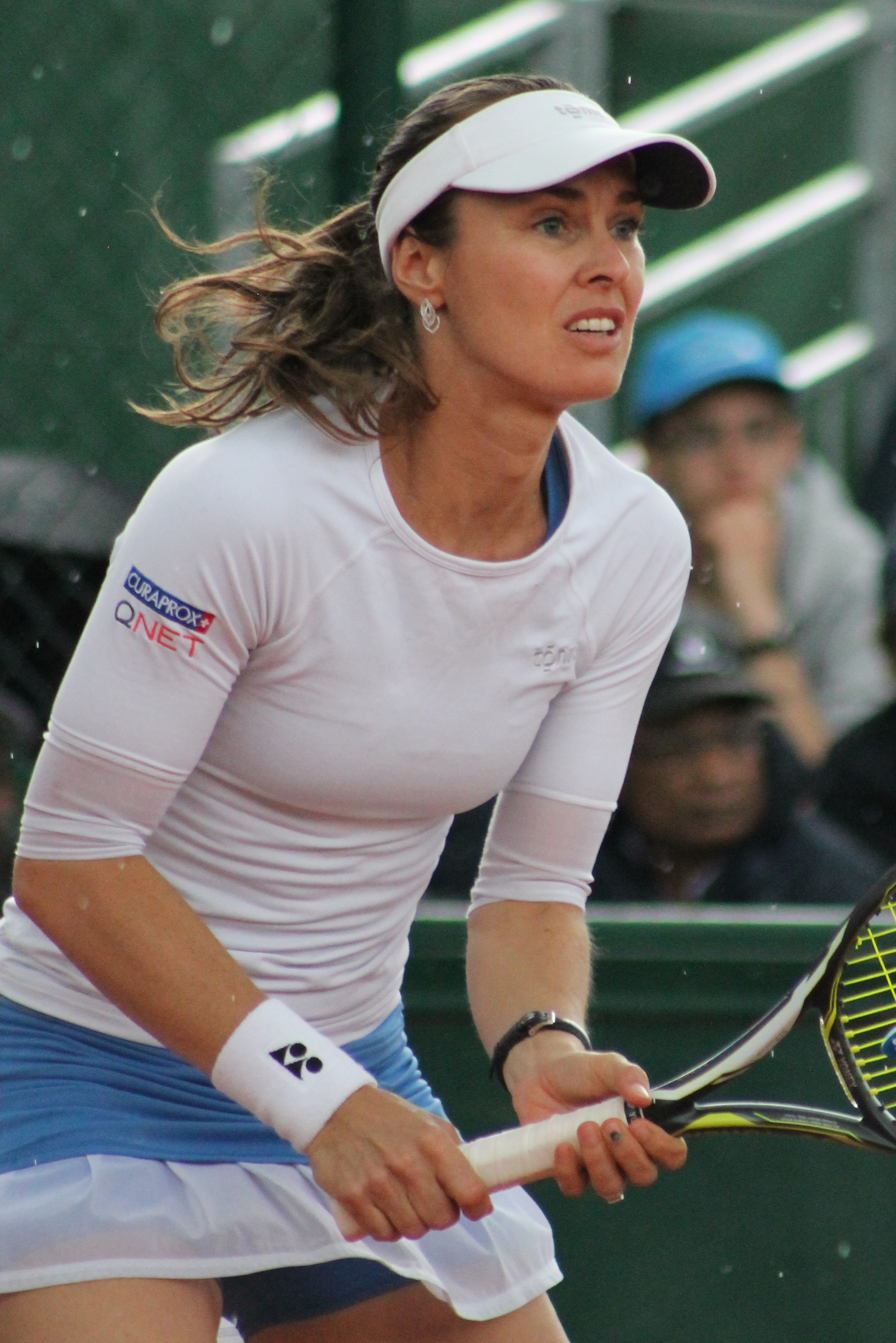
Martina Hingis, Swiss tennis player (b. 1980)

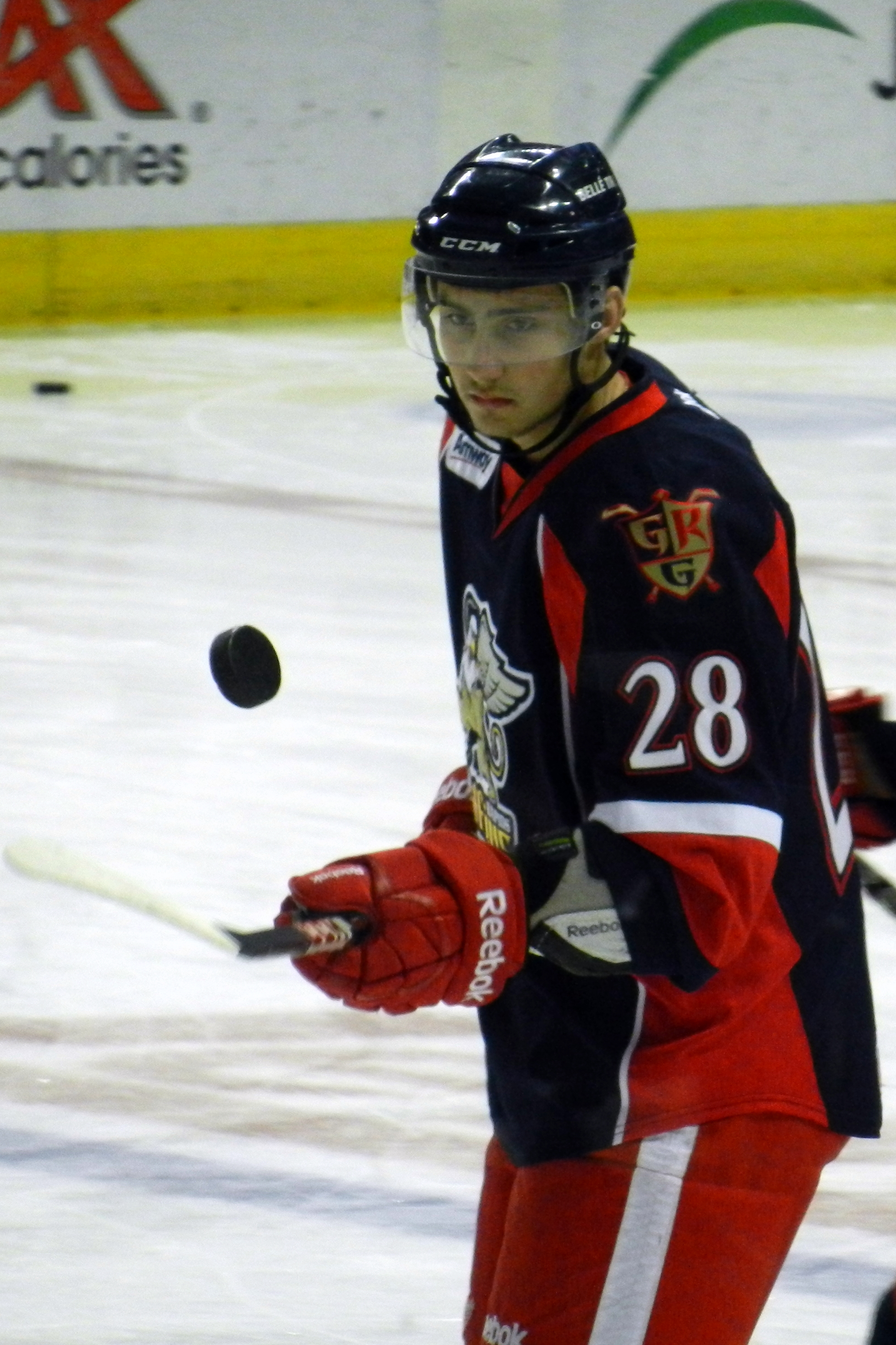
Tomáš Jurčo, Slovak ice hockey player (b. 1992)

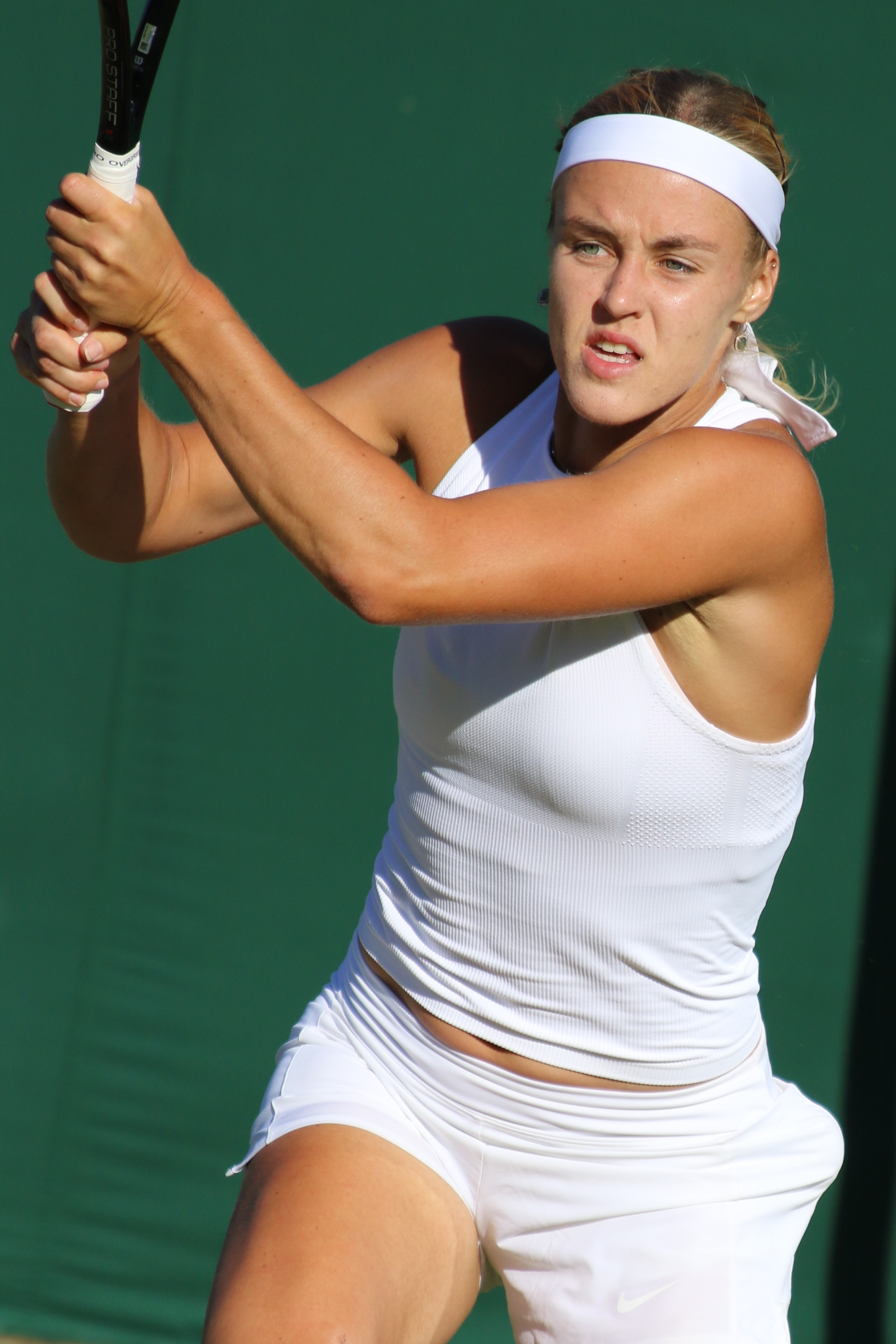
Anna Karolína Schmiedlová, Slovak tennis player (b. 1994)

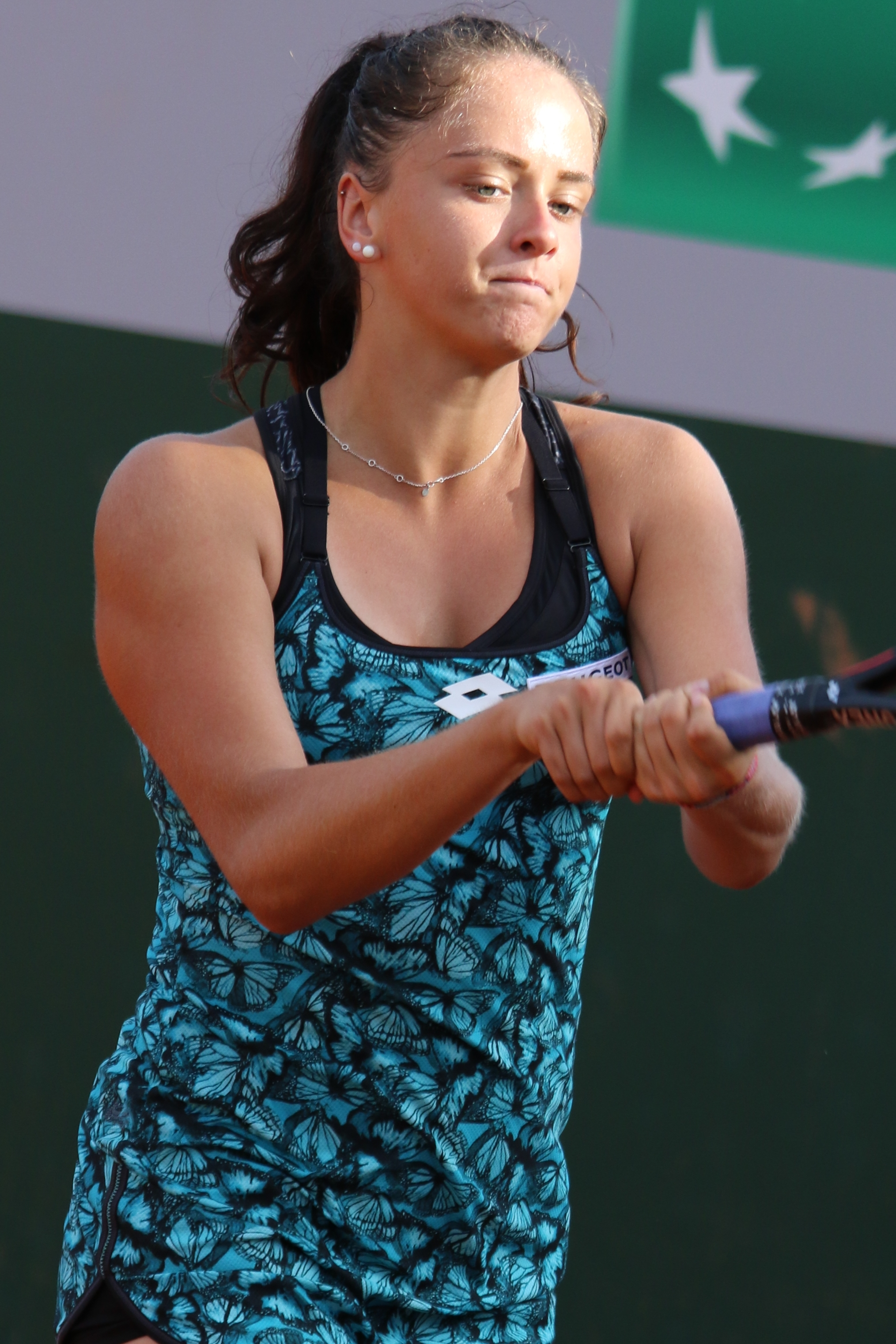
Viktória Kužmová, Slovak tennis player (b. 1998)

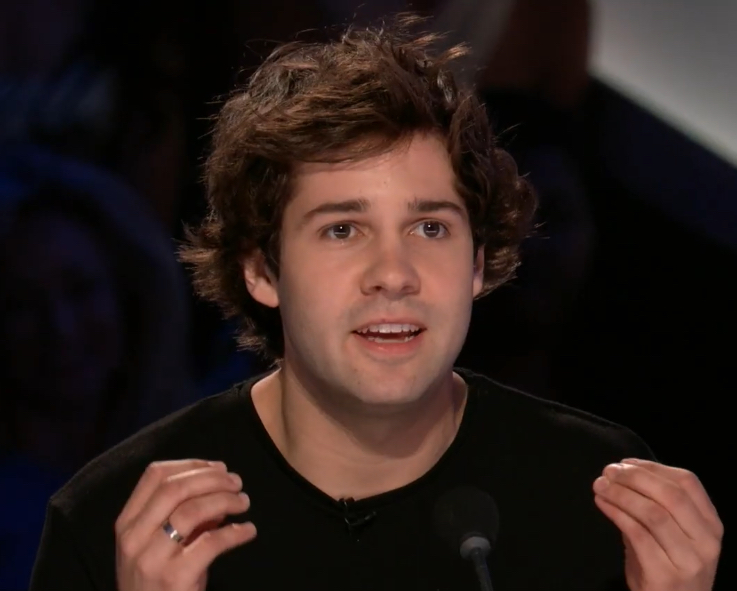
David Dobrik, American-based YouTube personality (b. 1996)

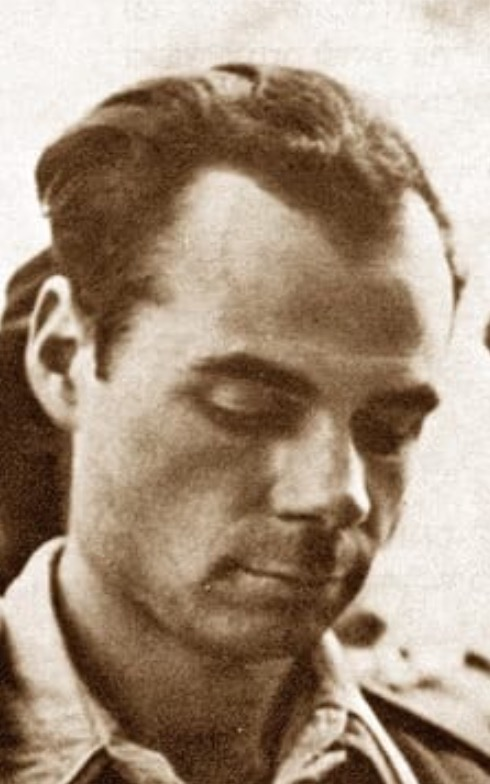
Moshe Rusnak commander of Haganah in the Jewish Quarter of the Old City of Jerusalem (1924-2006)

== A ==
- Edita Angyalová (born 1979), MP (2002-2007)

== B ==
- Frigyes Bán, Hungarian film director
- János Batsányi, poet and Hungarian language regenerate, worked and lived in Košice
- Gyula Benczúr, painter, started to learn in secondary school in Košice
- Jiří Bicek, ice-hockey player, won Stanley cup 2003 with New Jersey Devils
- Stephen Bocskay, prince of Transylvania, died in Košice

== C ==
- Michal Čekovský, basketball player, currently with the Maryland Terrapins
- Erik Černák, professional ice hockey player, born in Košice
- Lajos Csordák, painter, was born and died in Košice

== D ==
- Erna Diez (1913-2001), archaeologist
- David Dobrik (born 1996), YouTube personality
- Vladimír Dravecký (born 1985), Slovak ice-hockey player for the HC Oceláři Třinec, in the Czech Extraliga
- Gabriela Dzuríková (born 1973), actress

== E ==
- János Esterházy, ethnic Hungarian politician in former Czechoslovakia, won parliament mandate in Košice in 1935
- Edith Eger, Holocaust survivor, psychologist and author of “The Choice”

== G ==
- Radola Gajda, commander of the Russian Czechoslovak Legion, fascist politician, was given command of the 11th Division in Košice in 1922
- Dr. William Ganz, cardiologist co-invented the pulmonary artery catheter, born in Košice
- Béla Gerster, architect of the Corinth Canal and co-architect of the Panama Canal, born in Košice
- Richard Glück, Slovak politician
- Jozef Gönci, Slovak sport shooter and Olympic bronze medallist twice

== H ==
- Barbara Haščáková (1979-2023), singer
- Elchanan Heilprin (1921-2015), rabbi, born in Košice, in former Czechoslovakia
- Martina Hingis (born 1980), Swiss naturalised tennis player, born in Košice, in former Czechoslovakia
- Žofia Hruščáková (born 1995), basketball player

== I ==
- Julia Indichova, American reproductive healthcare activist and author, born in Košice, in former Czechoslovakia

== J ==
- Július Jakoby, painter, born and died in Košice
- Vladimír Janočko, Slovak football player, born in Košice
- Christián Jaroš, Slovak ice hockey player for the Ottawa Senators
- Tomáš Jurčo, Slovak ice hockey player for the Springfield Thunderbirds in the AHL

== K ==
- Peter Kažimír, State Secretary of Finance (2006-2010), MP (2010-2012), Minister of Finance (2012-2019), Central Bank governor (since 2019)
- Ferenc Kazinczy, Hungarian author, regenerator of the Hungarian language, studied, lived and worked in Košice
- Karol Kisel, Slovak footballer, born in Košice
- Gyula Kosice, Argentine sculptor, plastic artist, theoretician and poet
- Alex Král, Czech footballer born in Košice
- Juraj Kuniak, Slovak poet and writer, born in Košice
- Andrej Kvašňák, legendary Slovak football player

== M ==
- Božena Mačingová (1922–2017), Slovak writer, author of books for children and young adults
- Alexandra Makárová (born 1985), filmmaker
- Pál Maléter (1917–1958), military leader of the 1956 Hungarian Revolution, started to serve as a professional army officer in the Hungarian military in Košice
- Sándor Márai (1900–1989), Hungarian writer, born in Košice
- Martin Marinčin (born 1992), Slovak ice-hockey player for the Edmonton Oilers team in the NHL
- Samuel Migaľ (born 1982), Slovak politician

== N ==
- Ladislav Nagy (born 1979), ice-hockey player and former NHL player
- Erik Ňarjaš (born 1985), dancer and politician
- Imre Németh (1917–1989), Hungarian hammer fall champion, born in Košice

== P ==
- Pavol Paška, Speaker of the National Council of Slovakia (2006-2010, 2012-2014)
- Róbert Petrovický, Slovak ice hockey and former NHL player, born in Košice
- István Pongrácz, martyr killed by George I Rákóczi's soldiers in 1619
- Jozef Psotka, mountaineer, born in Košice

== R ==
- Veronika Rabada (born 1984), singer
- Arpád Račko (1930–2015), sculptor, worked in Košice
- Francis II Rákóczi (1676–1735), Prince of Transylvania and leader of anti-Habsburg uprisings, stayed in Košice and his remains are buried there

== S ==
- Blessed Sister Sára Salkaházi, Sister of Social Service, martyr murdered by the Arrow Cross Party in Budapest
- Marek Sapara, football player
- Anna Karolína Schmiedlová, tennis player
- Rudolf Schuster, former Košice mayor and the second president of Slovakia (1999–2004)
- Radoslav Školník, professional Slovak footballer, born in Košice
- Juraj Slafkovský, ice hockey player for the Montreal Canadiens. Selected first overall in the 2022 NHL Draft
- Koloman Sokol, artist, founder of Slovak graphic art, deemed "Slovak Picasso", studied in Košice
- Egon Steuer, head coach of the national basketball team of the Netherlands, born in Košice
- Aurel Stodola, engineer, physicist and inventor, studied in Košice
- Marek Svatoš, former ice hockey player for the Colorado Avalanche
- Ferenc Szálasi, politician leader of the Arrow Cross Party, born in Košice

== T ==
- Zuzana Tlučková (born 1962), actress
- Ladislav Troják (1914-1948), ice hockey player
- Rastislav Trtík (1961-2024), handball player and coach

== V ==
- Cyril Vasiľ (born 1965), eparchial Bishop of Slovak Catholic Eparchy of Košice

== W ==
- Barbora Wrzesiński (born 1994), basketball player

== Z ==
- Peter Žiga (born 1972), Minister of Environment (2012-2016) and Economy (2016-2020) of Slovakia
