= Tibor Baranski =

Man who saved more than 3,000 Hungarian Jews during the Holocaust

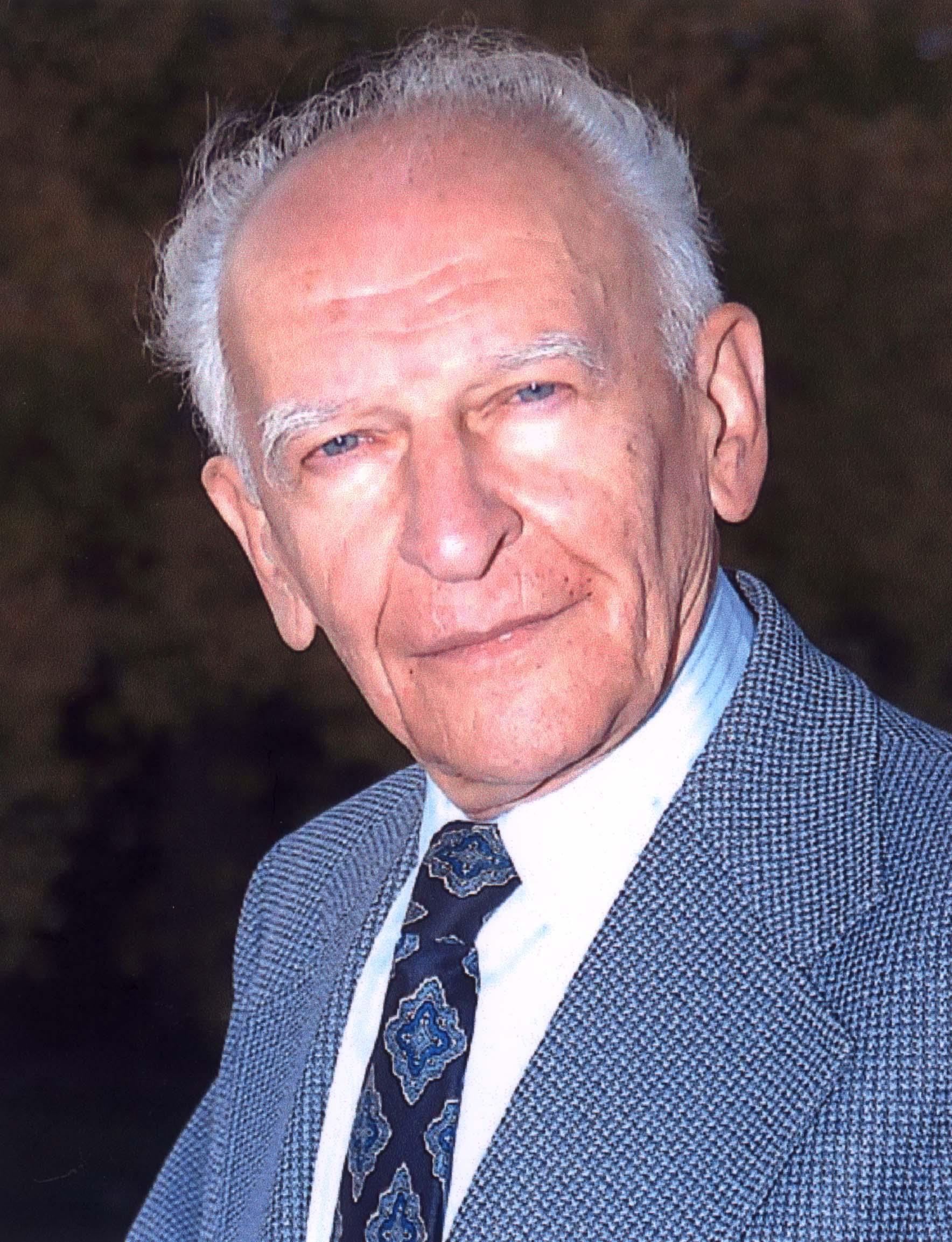
- Tibor Baranski in 2006
- Born: Tibor Baránszki; June 11, 1922; Budapest, Hungary
- Died: January 20, 2024 (aged 101); Buffalo, New York, U.S.
- Other names: Baranski
- Occupation: Teacher
- Known for: Saved more than 3,000 Jews during World War II
- Spouse: Katalin Kőrösy (m. 1957–2011)
- Children: 3
- Awards: Righteous Among the Nations

Tibor Baranski (June 11, 1922 – January 20, 2019) was a Hungarian-American man credited with saving more than 3,000 Hungarian Jewish women, men and children from the Nazis during the Holocaust.

When he was 22, he was forced by the advancing Soviets to leave his seminary studies and return to Budapest. He talked his way into the residence of Papal Nuncio Monsignor Angelo Rotta, the Vatican's representative in Budapest. He persuaded Rotta to give him papers that would allow a Jewish family, friends of his aunt, to escape Hungary. Rotta was so impressed by his boldness, he recruited Baranski to help save other Jews. Over nine weeks, before the Soviets surrounded Budapest, Baranski orchestrated the rescue of over 3,000 Jews.

Baranski was arrested by the Soviets on December 30, 1944, and sent on a 16-day, 160-mile (260 km) forced march towards a Soviet prison, during which he ate only four times. He was saved by a sympathetic guard and made his way back to Budapest. After he was hospitalized and released, he was arrested again in 1948 for "clerical reaction" and in a show trial was sentenced to nine years in prison. He was released after Stalin's death in 1953. He left Hungary during the 1956 revolution and settled with his wife in upstate New York, where both became US citizens and educators, and raised a family.

On January 11, 1979, Baranski was recognized as one of the Righteous Among the Nations by Yad Vashem. He was a member of the U.S. Holocaust Memorial Council.

== Early life ==
Baranski was the son of Reszl Baranski and Maria Schelnader. His grandfather was born in Poland and after serving in the Polish army in Budapest, decided to stay. His father married Maria Schelnader and Tibor was raised in Budapest. His father's family had roots in Hungary dating back 700 years. He was educated in Hungarian Gymnasia and became aware of rising antisemitism by 1938. He studied for the priesthood in Veszprém in 1940 and in Kassa (Košice) in 1943. He learned of the Nazi government's extermination camps through church channels. As the Soviet army drew near Košice, Baránszki was forced to leave for Budapest, sometimes only a few miles from the front lines, and arrived there on October 20, 1944.

== World War II ==
Baranski's aunt Margit Sterneder had become very close friends over several years with the Jewish family of Dr. Hedvig Szekeres through her work at the Chinoin pharmaceutical factory, in Újpest, a Budapest suburb.

=== Background ===
Starting in 1938, Regent Miklós Horthy led the government to pass a series of anti-Jewish measures, emulating Germany's Nuremberg Laws. The First Jewish Law passed on May 29, 1938, defined as Jewish anyone who had converted or were born to Jewish parents after 1919. It restricted the number of Jews in many professions to twenty percent. About 5,000 Jews converted to Christianity after the passing of the First Jewish Law. The second anti-Jewish law passed a year later on May 5, 1939, defined Jews for the first time by their race and not their faith. Individuals with two, three or four Jewish-born grandparents were declared Jewish. Jews were forbidden to work in government, as editors for newspapers, and the number of Jews among theater and movie actors, physicians, lawyers and engineers was capped at six percent. All private companies were forbidden to employ more than 12% Jews. Cumulatively, 250,000 Hungarian Jews were put out of work. Virtually all Jews lost their right to vote. At the next elections held in June, only 38 Jews could vote.

As a result of the laws and cultural oppression, the Sterneder and Szekeres families became even closer. The Third Jewish Law passed in 1941 prohibited sexual relationships between Jews and non-Jews and classified another 58,320 people as Jewish who did not profess Judaism. The census question about Jewish grandparents was added late in 1941 after some census forms had already been printed, contributing to an inaccurate count. In addition, many Christians of Jewish ancestry did not answer the question truthfully. So while about 62,000 Christians admitted some Jewish ancestry (including 38,000 in Budapest), the actual number of Christians of Jewish origin by mid-1941 may have exceeded 85,000 and up to 100,000.

A census beginning on January 31, 1941, counted a Hungarian population of 13,643,621. Based on the second anti-Jewish law, 6.2% (846,000) were considered Jewish. In April 1941, Hungary annexed the Bácska, Muraköz, and Muravidék regions from occupied Yugoslavia. The total population of its annexed territories in 1941 was 1,025,508, including 15,000 Jews. As of May 1941, 5.87% (861,000) of the entire Hungarian population of 14,669,129 were under Hungarian law considered Jewish. According to Jewish religious law, 4.94% (725,000) were Jewish.

=== Germans occupy Hungary ===
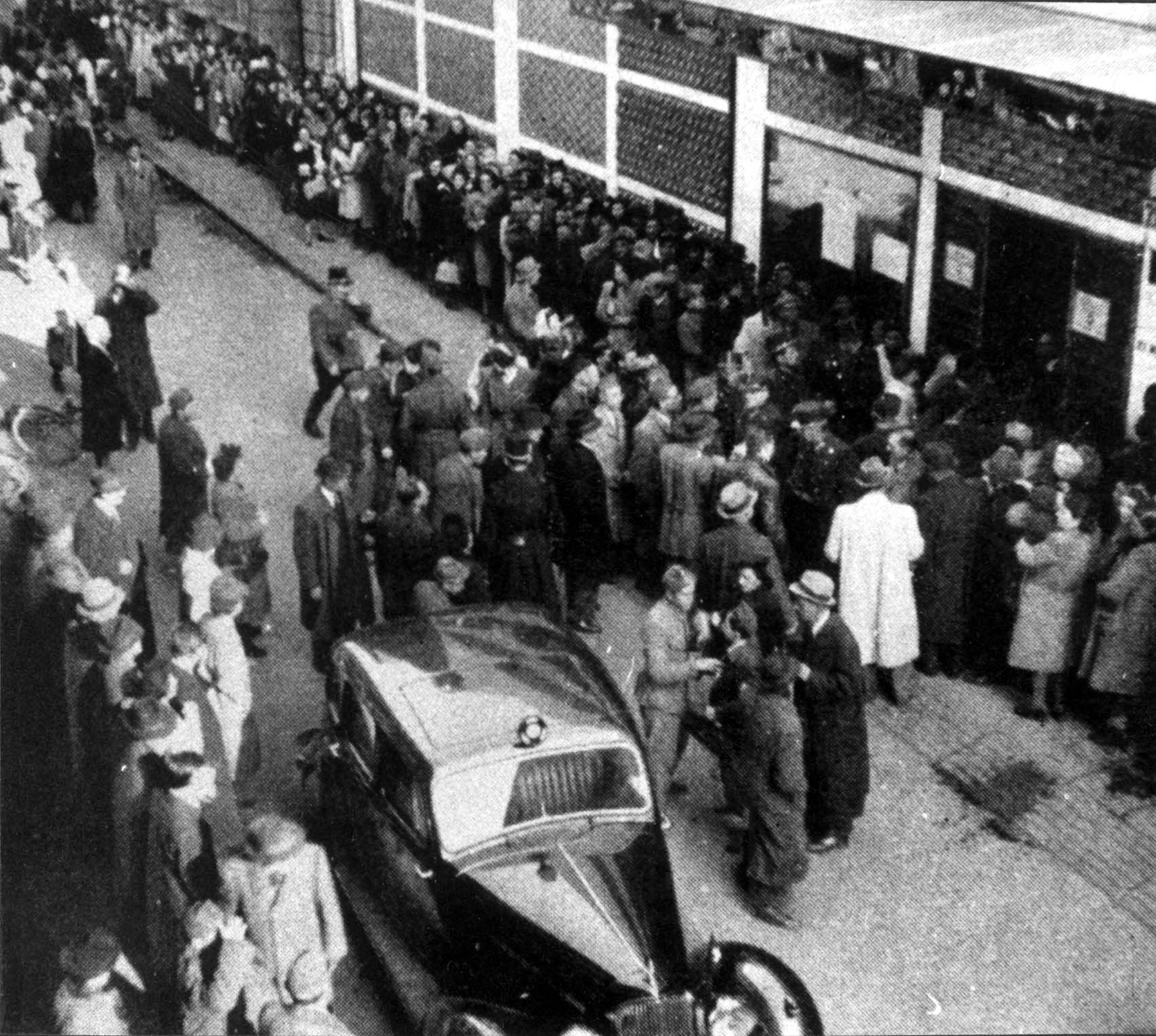
Jewish people stand in line to receive protective passports in front of the Glass House.

In early 1944, Hungarian prime minister Miklós Kállay was secretly attempting to negotiate a separate peace with the Allies. To prevent Hungary from leaving the Axis, on March 19, 1944, launched Operation Margarethe, ordering German troops into the country. The far-right fascist Arrow Cross Party was legalized and assumed power on 15 October 1944. Led by Ferenc Szálasi, they formed the Government of National Unity.

=== Jews sent to death camps ===
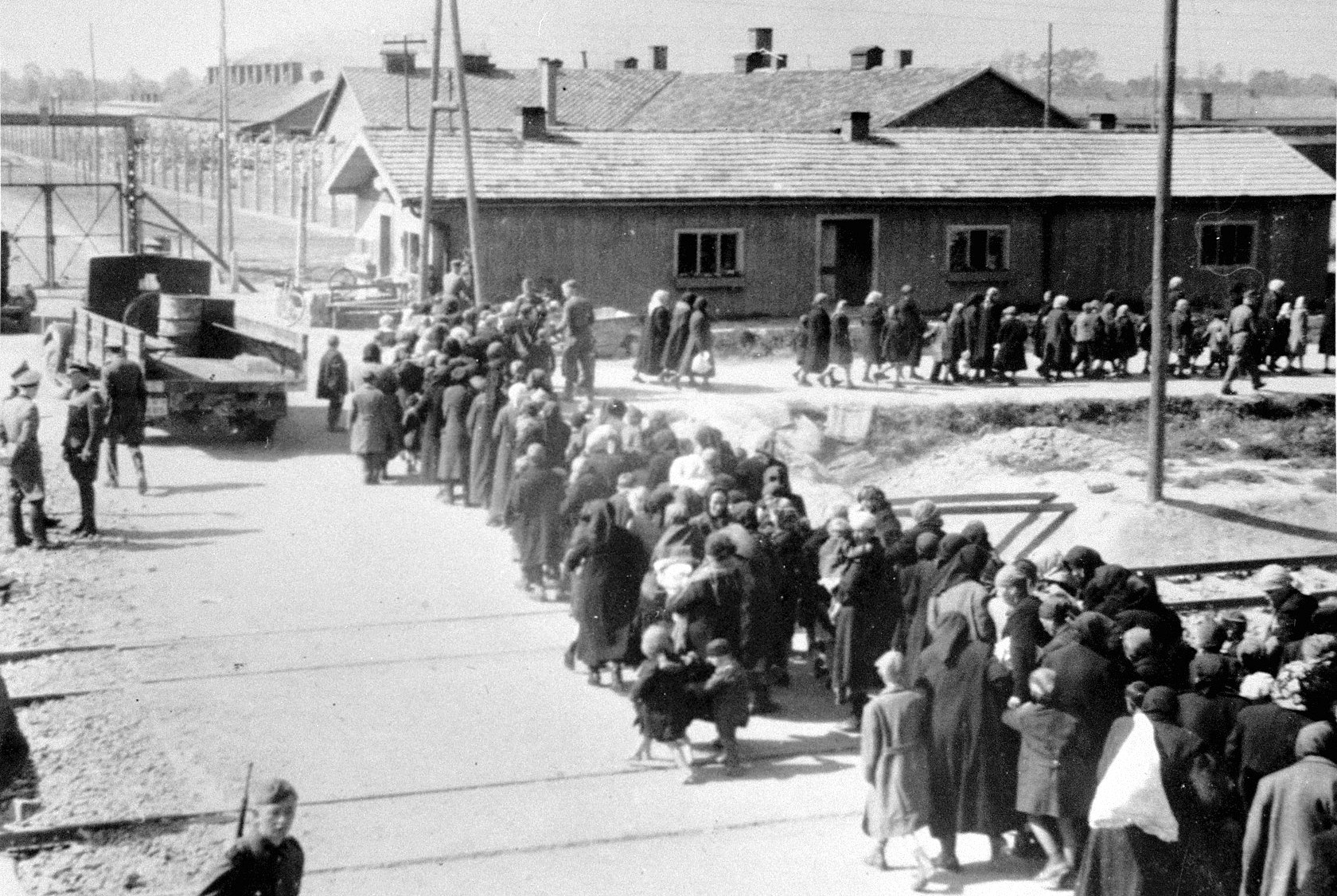
Hungarian Jews walk towards the gas chambers and crematoria at Auschwitz in Birkenau, Poland on 27 May 1944.

Mass deportations of Jews to German death camps in occupied Poland began. SS-Obersturmbannführer Adolf Eichmann went to Hungary to oversee the large-scale deportations. Between 15 May and 9 July, Hungarian authorities deported 437,402 Jews. All but 15,000 of these Jews were sent to Auschwitz-Birkenau, and 90% of those were murdered upon arrival. One in three of all Jews murdered at Auschwitz were Hungarian citizens.

By June the Germans had organized a program to force Hungarian Jews into mini-ghettos. On June 15, 1944, they were ordered to move into Yellow Star Houses, approximately 2,000 single-building mini-ghettos identified by a yellow Star of David over the entrance. Sterneder became active in an underground movement that helped Jews find hiding places and obtain false emigration documents. The Szekeres family fled into hiding, leaving their sick infant son Gabor Szekeres with the Sterneder family.

=== Moderates regain power ===
In early July 1944, Regent Miklós Horthy replaced Döme Sztójay, an avid supporter of the National Socialists, with the anti-Fascist General Géza Lakatos. Under the Lakatos regime, acting Interior Minister Béla Horváth ordered Hungarian gendarmes to prevent any Hungarian citizens from being deported. As the summer progressed, and the Allied and Soviet armies closed in on central Europe, the ability of the Nazis to devote themselves to Hungary's "Jewish Solution" waned. The Germans backed off from pressing Horthy's regime to continue further, large-scale deportations. Horthy's actions bought the Jews of Budapest a few months of time.

=== Fascists take over ===
In October 1944, Horthy attempted to secretly negotiate a cease-fire with the Soviets and ordered Hungarian troops to lay down their arms. In response, Nazi Germany launched Operation Panzerfaust. Troops led by Otto Skorzeny kidnapped Horthy's son and sent him to the Mauthausen concentration camp. The Germans forced Horthy to abdicate in favour of Szálasi, after which Horthy was taken into "protective custody" in Germany. Szálasi, leader of the Arrow Cross Party, was declared "Leader of the Nation" and prime minister of a "Government of National Unity". Szálasi organised the International Ghetto and over the next few months Arrow Cross members conducted frequent raids during which groups of Jews were taken to the banks of the Danube and executed.

=== Baranski leaves seminary ===
In 1944, Baranski was studying at a Catholic seminary near Kassa, Košice (present-day Slovakia) to become a priest. He learned of Nazi extermination plans through church channels. He was forced to return to Budapest at age 22 on October 20, 1944, as the Russian army drew near. By then the city was under tight control of German forces. Baranski lived with his aunt, who requested his help contacting Catholic church officials to ask them to intervene on behalf of the Szekeres family.

=== Gains Catholic church support ===
Baranski found a long line of people waiting for passes at Papal Nuncio Monsignor Angelo Rotta's embassy residence, the Vatican's representative in Budapest. It was one of five neutral country's embassies issuing "letters of protection", and the Swiss, Swedish, Spanish, Portuguese and Vatican embassies were swamped by long lines of people requesting help. Dressed in his priest's cassock, he later said, "I was not discouraged. Nonchalantly I pushed my way through the line and said that I was on official business." Germans and Hungarians believed that a "family could not be divided. So, if there was one Catholic spouse, for example, only one baptismal certificate was necessary. However, to cover the entire family, individual protection passes were needed, stipulating that the family was under papal protection."

Baranski wandered through the embassy until he found Rotta's office. No one questioned him wearing a priest's cassock. He persuaded Rotta to give him nine letters of protection, one for each member of the Szekeres family. Encouraged by his success, Baranski returned to Rotta a few days later to ask for another set of letters, this time for another Jewish family.

Rotta was impressed that Baranski spoke excellent German and had bluffed his way to the front of the line and into his presence. He recruited Baranski to help protect Jews at risk of being sent to the death camps. Rotta provided Baránszki with letters of protection, baptismal, and immigration certificates, and over the next 70 days Baránszki used them to save thousands of Jews in imminent danger of being murdered.

Two weeks later, Rotta appointed Baránszki as the executive secretary of the Vatican's Jewish Protection Movement in Hungary, serving as a direct emissary of the Papal Nuncio. As head of the Jewish Protection Movement, he soon met other neutral legations at Gresham Palace near the Chain Bridge. The group included Raoul Wallenberg, a Swedish diplomat later credited with saving tens of thousands of Hungarian Jews from Nazi death camps. Baranski collaborated with Wallenberg and arranged private, unofficial meetings between the Swedish diplomat and Papal Nuncio Angelo Rotta. Baránszki often led secretive meetings with diplomats including Wallenberg, Swiss Consul Carl Lutz, Spanish Consul Ángel Sanz Briz and Italian cattle trader Giorgio Perlasca to save Jewish lives in Budapest.

During his work with the Papal Nuncio, he saw two handwritten letters from Pope Pius XII encouraging the work to save the Jews. Baranski personally escorted individuals and families to hiding places, sometimes in secret rooms hidden within factories, and in the homes of other Catholics.

Baranski described Wallenberg's motivation as "divinely human love." "We knew in a second we shared the same opinion … the same recklessness, the same determination, all through," said Baránszki.

=== Bluffs guards ===
Rotta asked Baranski to go the next day to a factory where nearly 50 Jews who had been baptized as Catholic were being held captive before deportation to Germany and almost certain death. Rotta offered to loan Baranski a small Opel. Baránszki said he didn't want to go the next day, he wanted to go immediately. And he brazenly insisted on borrowing Rotta's diplomatic automobile, a Rolls-Royce limousine flying the Vatican flag. "I told his excellency, 'The Nazis are primitive people. A little shoehorn car would not show any representation of power. The Nazis would be impressed by a Rolls-Royce.'"

Baranski persuaded another young man to act as his driver and brought along a few others. He used the car to impress the Germans. Disguised as a priest, the 22-year-old adopted a haughty, authoritarian demeanor. At the factory, the Nazis refused to open the gates, and Baranski threatened to crash the car through it. They finally opened the gate and offered to show him where to go, but he rudely dismissed them, saying he knew where the Jews were being held. He discovered 2,000 Jews were being held captive inside, and called out the names of the baptized individuals he had been given. Then, while he distracted the guards, his assistants gave the remaining Jews information on how to contact the underground.

He boldly intercepted groups of Jews who were being deported to the death camps and using fake Vatican letters of protection, persuaded their guards to allow him to bring some prisoners back to Budapest.

In October and November, Eichmann accelerated the program to annihilate the remaining Jews of Hungary before the Soviet Army captured Budapest. About 50,000 Jews were forced to march from Budapest to Hegyeshalom on the Austrian-Hungarian border in November 1944, where they would be transferred to German custody. From 6,000 to 10,000 Jews died of hunger, cold and disease en route.

Rotta sent Baranski to Hegyeshalom with blank letters of protection. He freed hundreds of Jews, bringing them back to Budapest on a train. Acting as the Vatican representative, Baranski paid for the upkeep of thousands of Jews living in the Vatican's protected houses. With the help of his aunt, who worked for a pharmaceutical company, he distributed medicine, extra food, and supplies to the hidden Jews. "I worked night and day and got very little sleep. Some days I didn't have a second to eat," he recalled. "Besides the grace of God ... I had some courage and some organizational abilities."

If his deception was discovered, Baranski would have been killed. He credited his deep Catholic faith for the strength to ignore demands by Nazi officers that he stop working on behalf of Jews. When challenged with a gun to his head by a German officer about why he helped the Jews, he replied, "You are either silly or an idiot. It is because I am a Christian that I help the Jews." He received a call from Adolf Eichmann, who told him that only 3,000 of the 12,000 protection letters previously authorized by the Nazis would be honored. Not knowing who he was talking to, he told Eichmann, "I thought I was talking to a German officer, not a German scoundrel." Baranski helped those whose protection letters were no longer valid to hide in old houses and caves used as wine cellars. Using these methods, he said, "We were able to protect between 8,000 and 12,000 Jews," he said.

He successfully won the release of dozens and hundreds of captive Jews again and again. He gave the Nazis and Arrow Cross officials meaningless but official-looking and lifesaving documents and used every other ploy he could imagine. He harbored about 3,000 Jews in the Vatican's protected sector of apartment complexes. Varying sources state he saved up from 7,000 to as many as 12,000 Jews. Baránszki was arrested by the Soviets on December 30.

=== Arrest and imprisonment ===
The Soviets began the Siege of Budapest during the last week of December. They arrested Baránszki on 30 December 1944 as they believed he supported the Nazis. He was sent on a forced march to a prison in Russia. He ate only four times in 16 days during the 160-mile (260 km) march. He believed he would have died if a religious Soviet guard had not taken mercy on him, preventing another guard from shooting him, and then moving him to a line of prisoners who received medical help.

Baranski was hospitalized and after the war ended, eventually made his way back to Budapest. He finished his studies and became a vicar in Drégelypalánk in Northern Hungary. When the Soviets took control of the government, Baránszki liked them no more than the Nazis. He was arrested in 1948 for anti-Communist "clerical reaction," and in a show trial, was sentenced to nine years in prison. After Joseph Stalin died and Imre Nagy became chairman on 4 July 1953, Baranski was granted amnesty, after 57 months in prison.

His only reward for the risks he took, he said, would come from God "if" he was deserving. "I only did what God demanded of me. I'm only a useless servant."

== Later life ==
Freed from prison in 1953 after five years, Baranski became a freedom fighter during the Hungarian revolution, helping to organize assistance. He went to Rome in 1956 to seek Western support for the revolution. When the rebellion was crushed by the Soviets, Baranski did not want to return home. He liked Communists as much as he liked Nazis. "If you want to think like a cartoonist, Hitler and Stalin would be two cherries on the same tree," Baranski said. "There was no difference." He was sent back to Hungary, but he was able to slip out again among many other refugees.

He remained in Italy where he married Katalin Kőrösy on 8 July 1957. They started a school and camp for refugees, living in a refugee camp near Rome, Italy, for close to a year. In 1958 they obtained visas to Canada. They lived in Toronto before moving in 1961 to Buffalo, New York, where they raised their family.

Katalin had been attending school to become a medical doctor in Hungary, but was kicked out of the university during the Communist-Stalinist period. Based on her education in biochemical pharmacology and biochemistry, she was given a United States visa that stated, “Very important person. Urgently needed by the United States government to do research in biochemical pharmacology, i.e. biochemistry.” After arriving in Buffalo, she became a professor of biochemistry and cancer researcher at the University of Buffalo. She died in 2011. Baránszki adopted Katalin's son Peter Forgach, who became an eye surgeon, from her prior marriage. Their son Tibor Baranski Jr. learned Chinese as a teenager and became an international lawyer in Beijing, and their daughter Kati is as of 2019 Director of Communications at the Diocese of Buffalo.

== Legacy and honors ==
Wallenberg vanished while in the custody of Soviet forces. Before he died, Baranski was one of the last witnesses to the efforts to protect the Jews from the Nazis in Budapest. On January 11, 1979, he was named by Yad Vashem as Righteous Among the Nations. Baranski's aunt Margit Sterneder was also recognized as Righteous Among the Nations on January 11, 1979, and on July 16, 1997, Yad Vashem recognized Monsignor Angelo Rotta as Righteous Among the Nations.

Gabor Szekeres, the first person Baránszki saved, survived the war and married. His wife Agnes, whose parents were both murdered in the Holocaust, said of Baránszki, "He fought, and he was willing to sacrifice his life, for what he thought was right." The two families remain close to the present day.

In 1980, Baranski was appointed by President Jimmy Carter to the U.S. Holocaust Memorial Council where he helped guide the formation of the memorial. Hungarian Ambassador to the United States Dán Károly, presented Baranski with the Hungarian Honorary Cross of the Order of Merit at his home in Snyder, New York on October 7, 2013. His son Tibor Baranski Jr., an international transactions lawyer based in China and Japan, initiated contact with Swedish diplomats in China. This led to over five years of negotiations that resulted in contact with the Raoul Wallenberg family. In August 2017, Baranski Sr. joined by his two sons was invited by relatives of Wallenberg to be an honored guest for the annual Raoul Wallenberg Day events in Stockholm. While in Stockholm, several meetings were held with Nina Lagergren, the sister of Raoul Wallenberg, and also with the Swedish Minister of Foreign Affairs, and with the embassies of the United States, the Republic of Hungary, and the State of Israel. As the Vatican representative for the Jewish Protection Movement in Hungary at the end of WWII, under diplomatic protocol before the end of WWII, Baranski presided over meetings coordinating the activities held by the representatives of the five countries who were engaged in protecting Hungarian Jews, including Raoul Wallenberg representing Sweden, Switzerland, Portugal, Spain, with Baranski representing the Vatican. The Israeli Postal Authority issued a stamp to honor Baranski in April 2017.

Baranski's adopted son Peter Forgach said people used to ask Baranski how he could believe in God after all he witnessed. "These things happened, and there has to be a God to bring justice," Baranski responded.
