= Gizella Lutz =

First Lady of Hungary (1906–1992)

- Born: October 21, 1906
- Died: September 26, 1992 (aged 85)
- Spouse: Ferenc Szálasi (m. 1945; died 1946)
- Parent(s): Ferenc Lutz; Katalin Köbler

Ferencné Szálasi (née Gizella Lutz or Lucz; 21 October 1906 – 26 September 1992) was the longtime companion and, for a brief time, wife, of Ferenc Szálasi who served as Leader of the Hungarian Nation and de facto Prime Minister of Hungary at the end of World War II.

Her relationship with Szálasi began in 1927. However, Szálasi was far closer to his mother whom he lived with until her death in 1944, and despite being engaged in 1927, she only married Szálasi in 1945. During Szálasi's time as the leader of Hungary, Lutz hosted a salon attended by the other wives and mistresses of the Arrow Cross leaders who met regularly for tea and biscuits. The wife of Ferenc Kassai-Schallmayer, the propaganda minister in Szálasi's cabinet, recalled at her trial in 1946: "We women gathered at the invitation of Gizella Lutz. We discussed a variety of problems, also addressed political topics. We spoke about the coming victory of the Arrow Cross Party". As the unofficial first lady of Hungary, she was known for her insatiable greed, especially for looting the expensive clothing and jewelry of wealthy Hungarian Jewish women deported to the Auschwitz extermination camp, which she kept for herself. She was especially known for her fondness for keeping the expensive fur coats that had once been owned by Jewish women. Lutz was not well known to the Hungarian public during the brief rule of the Arrow Cross regime, but she was actively engaged in the politics of the regime. As the common-law wife of Szálasi who moreover was not a mother and worked full-time, she was not the ideal Arrow Cross woman. The woman who was most glorified by the Arrow Cross regime was Szálasi's mother who was presented as the ideal Magyar woman.

Lutz and Szálasi were married on 29 April 1945, on the wedding day of Adolf Hitler and Eva Braun. She was captured by the United States Army on 3 July 1945 and transferred to Hungary. Her husband was executed on 12 March 1946. Lutz was convicted twice by the People's Tribunals on 22 November 1945 and again on 19 June 1946 of abuse of power, theft of Jewish property, and of promoting the Arrow Cross. She was sentenced to twelve years imprisonment on 3 December 1953. For a time while in a woman's prison, she lived in the same cell with Júlia Rajk, the widow of the former Communist Interior Minister László Rajk who had been executed after a show trial in 1949. She was released in 1958. Lutz thereafter lived in an apartment in Budapest until her death in 1992.

Gizella Lutz was interviewed about her husband and their relation in 1989. She was asked whether she believed in Szálasi, to which she answered: "Of course I did, because the woman ought to believe in whom she loves." Contrary to her statement, Ferenc Szálasi made his role as husband less of a priority to fulfill his political responsibilities. In 1991, she was featured in the documentary Itélettlenül (Without Verdict) by Tamás Almási, where she held up a photograph of Szálasi shaking hands with Hitler, and then spoke with tears in her eyes about what a "great man" her husband had been whose name she believed had been maligned. In the documentary she came across as very much an unrepentant believer in the Arrow Cross, saying that 50 years later she felt no guilt over Szálasi's actions.

== See also ==
- Eva Braun
- Clara Petacci
