= Hrdza =

Slovak folk rock band

- Origin: Prešov, Slovakia
- Genres: Folk, Rock
- Years active: 1999 - present
- Labels: Universal Music Group (formerly)
- Website: Official website

Hrdza (lit. Rust in Slovak) is a Slovak folk rock band from Prešov, formed in 1999.

The band mostly performs in their native Slovakia, but they have played in numerous other nations including Austria, the Czech Republic, Germany, Hungary, Poland, and Slovenia.

== History ==
Hrdza was formed in 1999, in Prešov, by singer-guitarist Slavomír Gibarti and fellow singer Jaroslava Sisáková. They were later joined by Tóno Potočňák, drummer Lukáš Maťufka and bassist Róbert "Skippy" Hatala. In 2002, they released their debut independent album, Muzička. In the autumn of that year, founding member Sisáková left the band and was replaced by vocalist Veronika Rabadová, arguably leading to the band's their most recognizable era. During that period, Hrdza won more than 20 awards at home, as well as in the Czech Republic. Pod Božími Oknami (Under God's Windows) was the title of their second album, released in 2006. In the summer of that same year, their single "Na horách býva" (He lives in the mountains) was on the Top 50 music chart in Slovakia for 17 weeks, ironically reaching a peak position of #17.

Hajnajnanyja, their third album, was released in November 2009. Veronika Rabadová left in 2015, and Susanna Jara assumed the role of lead singer. Their fourth and most acclaimed album, Neskrotený (Untamed), was released in December 2018. It entered the World Music Charts Europe (WMCE) at #4 in April 2019. This is the highest international chart position ever attained by a Slovak band. The song and video “Stefan” topped the World Music Charts by Ethnocloud in March 2019.

On 15 July 2021, the group released its fifth album, 22.

== Eurovision 2010 ==
In 2010, Hrdza participated in the Slovak National Round of Eurosong in the Eurovision Song Contest 2010 with the song "Taká sa mi páči" (‘I like her like that’); the group won 19.5% of the vote, but was disqualified from the contest when it was realised that Hrdza had presented the song before 1 October 2009, which was in violation of the rules.

== Members ==
Current Members

- Slavomír Gibarti - Vocals and Guitar
- Susanna Jara - Vocals and Violin
- Dominik Maniak - Vocals and Violin
- Matej Palidrab - Vocals and Accordion
- Pavol Boleš - Vocals, Accordion and Bass Guitar
- Marek Szarvaš - Drums

Alternating Members

- Lucia Gibarti - Vocals
- Julka Smolková - Vocals
- Ľubo Šamo - Vocals and Violin
- Mykhaylo Zakhariya - Cimbalom

Past Members

- Veronika Šoltysová-Rabadová - Vocals (2002 - 2015)
- Jaroslava Sisáková - Vocals (1999 - 2002)
- Anton Potočňák - Vocals and Violin
- Michal Brandys - Vocals and Violin (2006 - unclear)
- Michal Lörinc - Drums and Various Percussion
- Lukáš Maťufka - Drums and Various Percussion (2000 - unclear)
- Róbert "Skippy" Hatala - Vocals and Bass Guitar (2002 - 2004)
- Miroslav Szirmai - Drums and Various Percussion (ca. 2009 - unclear)
- Marián Šurányi - Vocals and Accordions (2012 - unclear)

== Discography ==
Title	Translation into English	Album details
Muzička	Music	Released: 2002; Label: Self Released; Format: CD
Pod Božími Oknami	Under God's Windows	Released: 2006; Label: Universal; Format: CD
Hajnajnanyja	Hajnajnanyja	Released: 2009; Label: Universal Music Group; Format: CD
Hrdzavá Osemnástka	Hrdza's Eighteen	Released: 2016; Label: Self Released; Format: CD
Neskrotený	Untamed	Released: 2018; Label: Self Released; Format: CD
22	22	Released: 2021; Label: Self Released; Format: CD
Čo mi je, to mi je	What's wrong with me is what's wrong with me	Released: 2023; Label: Self Released; Format: CD
