= Veronika Rabada =

Slovak singer (born 1984)

- Born: Veronika Rabadová; 11 May 1984 (age 42); Košice, Czechoslovakia
- Occupation: Singer
- Instrument: Vocals
- Years active: 2002–present
- Formerly of: Hrdza (2002-2015)
- Website: www.rabada.sk

Veronika Šoltysová Rabadová (born 11 May 1984) is a Slovak singer. She is known for mixing rock, pop, and folk influences in her music.

== Early life ==
Veronika Šoltysová Rabadová was born on 11 May 1984 in Košice. Her birth surname, Rabada, is of Lemkos origin. She grew up in the nearby village of Kysak. After graduating from high school, she studied pedagogy at University of Prešov for about a year, but did not find her studies enjoyable. Instead, she graduated in acting at the Academy of Arts in Banská Bystrica.

== Musical career ==
From 2002 until 2015, Rabadová was the lead vocalist of the Slovak world music band Hrdza. During her time with Hrdza, the band released three albums: Muzička (2002), Pod božími oknami (2006), and Hajnajnanyja (2009). From 2018, she also started performing with the folk band Kandráčovci.

In 2015, Rabadová left Hrdza to focus on her solo career under the name Veronika Rabada.

In 2018, she released her first solo album Lúka as well as an album of traditional Christmas carols Koleda s Veronikou Rabada.

In 2022, Rabada released her new album titled Sukne, inspired by Slovak, Serbian, Rusyn, and Romani folklore. She also recorded the theme song for the movie Piargy.

== Discography ==
- Lúka (2018)
- Koleda s Veronikou Rabada (2018)
- Sukne (2022)
