= Erna Diez =

Austrian classical archaeologist

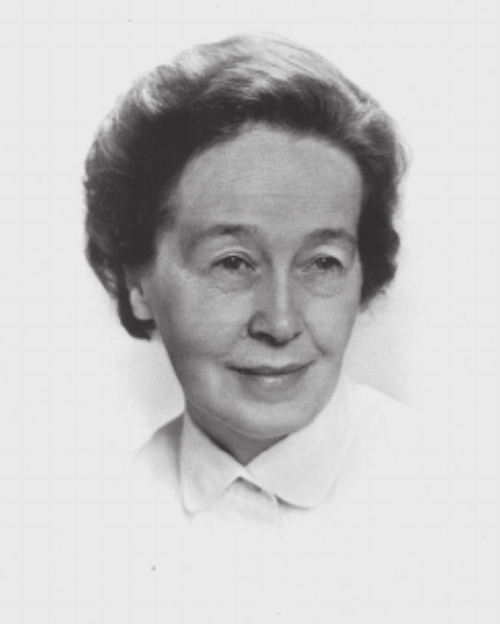
- Born: 8 April 1913; Kaschau
- Died: 1 December 2001 (aged 88)
- Occupation: Archaeologist

Academic background
- Education: University of Graz
- Thesis: Quomodo Valerius Maximus res in factorum and dictorum memorabilium libris IX narratas exornaverit (1937)

Academic work
- Discipline: Classical archaeology
- Institutions: University of Graz
- Main interests: Art of Noricum and Pannonia

Erna Diez (8 April 1913 - 1 December 2001) was an Austrian classical archaeologist who undertook significant work on Roman art and the archaeology of the provinces of Noricum and Pannonia.

== Early life and education ==
Diez was born in Kaschau in 1913. Diez studied classical philology, archaeology, art history and history at the University of Vienna and graduated from the University of Graz. In 1937 she earned her doctorate, with a thesis entitled "Quomodo Valerius Maximus res in factorum and dictorum memorabilium libris IX narratas exornaverit".

== Career ==
Whilst visiting Italy in 1939 she studied art. From 1943 she worked at the Archaeological Institute of the University of Graz and supervised the collection of Roman stone monuments in Styria. From 1945 she headed the Institute of Classical Archaeology at the University of Graz and lectured there. In 1967 she became an associate professor of classical archaeology and a member of the Historical State Commission for Styria. In 1970 she received a professorship, becoming an emeritus professor in 1983.

Her major work was on provincial art in Noricum. Her presentation at the 8th International Archaeological Congress in Paris in 1963 was considered groundbreaking. A festschrift was published for her in 1978. In 2008, a street in Graz in the district of Strassgang was named after her. The annual Erna Diez prize is awarded in her memory in art history of the archaeology of Noricum and Pannonia.

She was a corresponding member of the German Archaeological institute.

== Selected publications ==
- Flavia Solva : die Römischen Steindenkmäler auf Schlosz Seggau bei Leibnitz. Österreichisches archaeologisches Institut.
- Kunstprovinzen im römischen Imperium : ausgewählte Schriften. Wien: Phoibos Verlag.
