= Ferenc Szálasi =

Fascist dictator of Hungary from 1944 to 1945

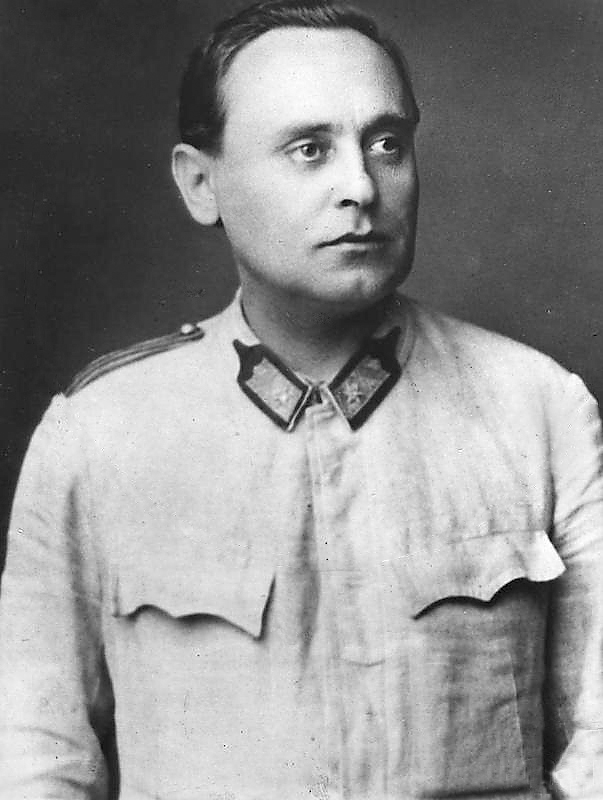
- Szálasi in 1944

Leader of the Nation
- In office 4 November 1944 – 7 May 1945
- Preceded by: Miklós Horthy (as Regent of Hungary)
- Succeeded by: High National Council (as collective head of state)

Prime Minister of Hungary
- In office 16 October 1944 – 7 May 1945
- Preceded by: Géza Lakatos
- Succeeded by: Béla Miklós

Personal details
- Born: 6 January 1897 Kassa, Austria-Hungary
- Died: 12 March 1946 (aged 49) Budapest, Hungary
- Cause of death: Execution by hanging
- Party: Arrow Cross Party
- Spouse: Gizella Lutz
- Profession: Soldier, politician
- Awards: 3rd Class, Order of the Iron Crown

Military service
- Allegiance: Austria-Hungary; Kingdom of Hungary
- Branch/service: Austro-Hungarian Navy; Austro-Hungarian Army; Royal Hungarian Army
- Years of service: 1915–1935
- Rank: Major
- Commands: 1st Honvéd Mixed-Brigade
- Battles/wars: World War I

Ferenc Szálasi (Note: Hungarian pronunciation: [ˈfɛrɛnt͡s ˈsaːlɒʃi]) (6 January 1897 – 12 March 1946) was a Hungarian military officer, politician, Nazi sympathizer and founder of the far-right fascist Arrow Cross Party who headed the government of Hungary during the country's occupation by Nazi Germany in the final stages of World War II.

Szálasi served with distinction during World War I as an officer in the Austro-Hungarian Army. In 1925, he became a staff officer of the restored Kingdom of Hungary under Regent Miklós Horthy. Initially apolitical, Szálasi embraced right-wing ultranationalism in the early 1930s and became a passionate advocate of the irredentist Hungarism. In 1937, he founded the Hungarian National Socialist Party, having retired from the military and fully devoted himself to politics. He attracted considerable support through his virulently nationalist and antisemitic program, while his followers became increasingly radical, leading to his imprisonment in 1938. While in prison, he was proclaimed leader of the far-right Nazi Arrow Cross Party, which quickly became one of the most powerful political forces in the country. Szálasi was granted amnesty in 1940, but had to operate his party clandestinely after Horthy outlawed it on the outbreak of World War II.

Following the German occupation of Hungary in March 1944 and Horthy's ousting in October, Szálasi was made head of government and head of state. His pro-Nazi puppet government, known as the Government of National Unity, was dominated by members of the Arrow Cross Party. The regime imposed martial law, participated in Germany's war efforts and recommenced the Holocaust in Hungary, which had been halted by Horthy. His militias were singularly responsible for the murder of 10,000–15,000 Hungarian Jews and for the deportation of a further 650,000 to death camps.

Szálasi's collaborationist government, with its authority limited to the city of Budapest and its environs, only lasted 163 days. Facing the advance of Soviet and Romanian forces, Szálasi and his cabinet fled the country shortly before the Siege of Budapest began. He was captured by American troops in Austria in May 1945 and returned to Hungary to face trial. The Government of National Unity, which had relocated to Munich, was formally dissolved the next day. The People's Tribunal in Budapest found him guilty of war crimes and high treason, and sentenced him to death. He was executed by hanging on 12 March 1946.

== Early life ==
=== Ancestry ===
Born the son of a soldier in Kassa, Abaúj-Torna County, Kingdom of Hungary (now Košice, Slovakia) of mixed Armenian (the surname of his great-grandfather was Salossian), German, Hungarian (one grandparent), Slovak and Rusyn ancestry. His Armenian ancestors settled down in Ebesfalva, Transylvania during the reign of Prince Michael I Apafi. Szálasi's grandfather, who participated as a honvéd in the Hungarian Revolution of 1848, married a German woman from Vienna, and their son, Ferenc Szálasi, Sr. (born 1866) attended a military cadet school in Kassa and later became an official in the Honvédség. Szálasi's brothers, Béla, Károly and Rezső also served in the army.

Szálasi's mother was the Greek Catholic Erzsébet Szakmár (born 1875), who had Slovak and Rusyn roots. She provided religious education to her sons. Szálasi once said "I received the power of belief and faith in God through breast milk. My mother made to drink faith through and through me". Ferenc Szálasi lived with his mother until 1944.

=== Military career ===
Szálasi followed in his father's footsteps and joined the army at a young age. He finished elementary studies in his birthplace, then attended the military academy in Kőszeg, Marosvásárhely (now Târgu Mureș in Romania) and continued studies in Kismarton. Finally, he finished his military education in the Theresian Military Academy of Wiener Neustadt, where he was promoted to Lieutenant in 1915.

He eventually became an officer and served in the Austro-Hungarian Army during World War I. He served on the frontline for 36 months. At the end of the war, he was promoted to First Lieutenant and was involved in the 2nd regiment of k.u.k. Tyrolean Rifle Regiments, widely known as Kaiserjäger. He was stationed near Merano and Lake Garda in the Italian Front. Later the regiments were ordered to the north to Verdun at the last days of the war. For his service, he was honored with Third Class of the Order of the Iron Crown. Returning to Hungary, Szálasi performed courier service for the newly formed Ministry of Foreign Affairs after the Aster Revolution in November 1918.

Upon the dissolution and break-up of Austria-Hungary after the war, the Hungarian Democratic Republic and then the Hungarian Soviet Republic were briefly proclaimed in 1918 and 1919 respectively. The short-lived communist government of Béla Kun launched what was known as the "Red Terror" and ultimately involved Hungary in an ill-fated war with Romania. In 1920, the country went into a period of civil conflict with Hungarian anti-communists and monarchists violently purging the nation of communists, leftist intellectuals, and others they felt threatened by, especially Jews. This period was known as the "White Terror" and, in 1920, after the pullout of the last of the Romanian occupation forces, it led to the restoration of the Kingdom of Hungary (Magyar Királyság) under Regent Miklós Horthy. During that time, Szálasi was still an apolitical person, and he did not involve himself in events beyond the general interest. In 1926, he attended the trials of the officials associated with the Franc affair, a plan to destroy the French economy by circulating thousands of counterfeit francs. In a series of letters to the editor of various newspapers, Szálasi attacked the courts for convicting the "patriots", saying that the only thing wrong with the counterfeiting operation was that the disguised General Staff officers who been supposed to circulate the counterfeit francs had been arrested before they had gotten many of the counterfeit francs into circulation.

In 1920–21, Szálasi finished non-commissioned officer training school in Hajmáskér; following that, he served in the 13th Infantry Regiment in Miskolc. In 1923, he enrolled to the General Staff officers' training course at the Ludovica Military Academy. For his outstanding achievements, he was promoted with priority to Captain in 1924. In 1925, Szálasi entered the General Staff of the restored Kingdom. He fulfilled his mandatory field-grade task in 1929 at the 11th Infantry Regiment in Debrecen as a company commander. According to some memoirs by former subordinates, Szálasi was a popular and beloved superior among the infantry. His fellow officers acknowledged his military skills and literacy, but some others thought Szálasi was pedantic and autonomous. According to his future Minister of Defence, Károly Beregfy, "Szálasi's name among the General Staff was a concept of excellent hunting and tactics, but also a concept with the regards of honesty, truthfulness and Puritanism." Starting in 1927, Szálasi formed a common law relationship with his servant Gizella Lutz, whom he was to marry in 1945. Szálasi was very close to his mother, whom he lived with until 1944. By 1933, Szálasi had attained the rank of Major and became Chief of the 1st Honvéd Mixed-Brigade's General Staff in Budapest.

== Political career ==
=== First steps in politics ===
Around this time, when Gyula Gömbös came to power, Szálasi became fascinated with politics and often lectured on Hungary's political affairs. By this time, the hitherto apolitical Szálasi was a fanatical right-wing nationalist and a strong proponent of "Hungarism" and advocating the expansion of Hungary's territory back to the borders of Greater Hungary as it was prior to the Treaty of Trianon, which in 1920 had reduced the country's territory by 72%. In 1933, to summarize his views, he published his 46-page pamphlet with the title A magyar állam felépítésének terve ("Plan for the Building of the Hungarian State") and sent his work to several politicians. Soldiers and military officers were banned from politicizing, thus Szálasi was sentenced to twenty-day detention and expelled from the General Staff by a military court. After his release, Szálasi was ordered to the 14th Infantry Regiment in Eger, where served as staff officer then first adjutant. Szálasi gradually became disillusioned with the army and requested resignation from that in October 1934.

On 1 March 1935, Szálasi left the army in order to devote his full attention to politics, after which time he established the Party of National Will, a nationalistic group. It was eventually outlawed by the conservative government for being too radical. Unperturbed, Szálasi established the Hungarian National Socialist Party in 1937, which was also banned. However, Szálasi was able to attract considerable support to his cause from factory workers and Hungary's lower classes by pandering to their aggrieved sense of nationalism and their virulent antisemitism. Szálasi's populist style and his appeal to the masses made him the object of much distrust by the governing conservative politicians. The political system in the Kingdom of Hungary had disfranchised most of the poor by making income level a criterion for voting and holding office. Under the laws introduced in 1922 only 28% of Hungarians were wealthy enough to be allowed to vote and hold office with the rest all disfranchised. Furthermore, the open ballot along with the way that the seats in Parliament were gerrymandered by giving urban areas less seats than what their share of the population entitled them to ensured that the governing conservative party, the Unity Party (which later changed its name to the Party of Hungarian Life) always won the elections. Szálasi's vague call for a "changing" of the Hungarian system along with his populism led for the elites to see him as a demagogue who was threatening the existing system.

The American historian Paul Hanebrink described Szálasi as one of the more eccentric fascist leaders in Europe as his views on a number of issues were "peculiar and often unfathomable". The main figure on the Hungarian right in the 1920s was the Anglophile conservative prime minister István Bethlen who greatly admired the British Conservative Party and always believed that Great Britain would at some point step in to peacefully revise the Treaty of Trianon by pressuring Yugoslavia, Romania and Czechoslovakia to return the lands they had gained under the treaty. By the 1930s, many Hungarians had felt that Bethlen's peaceful approach had failed and favored the approach of the radicals who wanted an alliance with Germany to regain all of the Lands of the Crown of St. István via war. Szálasi was not the only radical politician to advocate an alliance with Germany, but in terms of style he was one of the radicals who made the most forceful impression. Gömbös during his time first as defense minister starting in 1929 and then as prime minister starting in 1932 had promoted a number of officers sympathetic to his views, and as a result the officer corps was a stronghold of radicals. As a result of Gömbös's policies, many Honved officers were attracted to the message preached by the former officer Szálasi. Szálasi was not hostile towards Christianity, but he did insist that Hungarians identify as Hungarians first and Christians second, writing in his book The Road and the Way that every "Magyar priest" should be "a priest and brother to every Magyar and according to the commands of his faith bring his Magyar brothers closer to God, but not as Catholics, Calvinists, Lutherans, Greek Catholics, Greek Orthodox or Unitarians". Szálasi was much influenced by the misogyny of his times, and tended to see the Arrow Cross's many women followers as only good for domestic tasks such as cooking, cleaning and sewing. Szálasi created a cult around his mother, whom he presented as the ideal Magyar woman, and made his mother's name day into the Arrow Cross equivalent of mother's day.

Reflecting the origins of the Magyar language and culture in Asia, Szálasi embraced the idea of Turanism as he proclaimed the Magyars to be a "Turanian" people who were just as much as a "master race" as the Aryan Germans. He also considered the Japanese to be a fellow Turanian people whose origins were the same as the Magyars, and as such he was a noted Japanophile. Szálasi argued that the Treaty of Trianon was the "Western" humiliation of the Magyars who were being punished only for their Asian origins. In his ideology, the Magyars were a "pure" racial mixture of various Asian peoples who despite their "Eastern" origins, the Magyars had a "Western" culture and thus formed a bridge between European and Asian culture. The British historian Philip Morgan noted there was a contradiction between his claims of a "pure" Turanian racial origins of the Magyars vs. his claims that the Magyars were the product of the mixing of various Asian and European peoples. Szálasi argued that the world had three "master races", namely the Germans, the Magyars and the Japanese who would crave up the world into three great empires. As the "bridge" between European and Asian cultures, Szálasi saw Hungary as playing the crucial mediating role between Germany and Japan. He not only wanted to take back all of the Lands of the Crown of St. István lost under the Treaty of Trianon, but also envisioned a Hungarian empire covering much of Eastern Europe and the Middle East including a number of areas that were never under Hungarian rule, which would co-exist with the empires to be established by Germany and Japan. As a devout Catholic who faithfully attended Mass, Szálasi was uncomfortable with the open nostalgia expressed by many of the Hungarian Turanists for the pagan past and complained some of the leading Turanists were Jews. Morgan described Szálasi's ideas as "Turanian tosh", writing that Szálasi was engaged in pseudo-history with his "Turanian" theories that held that the Magyars and the Japanese were merely distant branches of the same people.

Szálasi denounced Hungarian Jews were as an "anti-national" element who invented both Communism and "finance capital" as a way of controlling the world. Despite the fact that in the 19th century, most Hungarian Jews had abandoned Yiddish in favor of Magyar, Szálasi considered Hungarian Jews to be of the "Semitic" race and as such incapable on racial grounds of being Hungarians. Szálasi had read in Magyar translation The Protocols of the Learned Elders of Zion, which were first published in a Russian newspaper, Znamia (The Banner), in 1903 and purported to reveal a Jewish conspiracy to take over the world, said to have been decided at the time of the first meeting of the World Zionist Congress in 1897. He accepted wholeheartedly the authenticity of The Protocols of the Elders of Zion, saying that everything that happened in the world since 1897 matched what The Protocols had predicted despite the fact that The Protocols had been exposed as a forgery in 1921 by the British journalist Philip Graves. Szálasi wanted a "Jew free" Hungary, through in the 1930s he envisioned expulsion of all the Jews rather than their extermination as the solution to the "Jewish Question". Szálasi called for an Italian style corporate state that he believed would reconcile the interests of labour and capital. In economic affairs, he favored dirigisme with the Hungarian state to take over entire sections of the economy such as banking. For various sociological reasons, minorities can sometimes be disproportionately overrepresented in the business world, which was the case with Armenians and Greeks in the Ottoman empire; Indians in the British East African colonies of Uganda, Kenya and Tanganyika; huaren (ethnic Chinese) in Southeast Asia and Jews in Eastern Europe. The census of 1920 revealed that 6% of the Hungarian population was Jewish and that 69% of the Jews in Hungary were the owners of businesses or worked as the salaried employees of businesses, 14% worked as teachers or as professionals such as lawyers and doctors and another 15% worked as tradesmen. The same census showed that 45% of all Hungarian Jews lived in Budapest where they owned 66% of the small businesses, made up 90% of those who worked in banking and forms of finance, were 56% of the salaried employees in factories, and made up 70% of those engaged in commence. The Hungarian Jews were widely disliked for their successes in business and in the professions, and Szálasi promised to break what he called the Jewish domination of the middle class and to create a Christian middle class by redistributing Jewish wealth to Christians. In his free time, Szálasi elaborated upon his theory that Jesus Christ was not a Jew, but rather a member of the hitherto-unknown "Godvanian race". Habebrink described "the Godvanians" as "a product of Szálasi's odd, but ever fertile imagination". Central to Szálasi's thinking was the expression rõg ("clod of the earth") and related terms such as rõgvalóság ("reality of the cog of the earth"), which represented to him the ancient Magyar values which he believed consisted of the a "trinity" of the workers, peasants and intellectuals who each in their own ways represented differents aspects of the rõg.

After Germany's "Union" (Anschluss) with Austria in 1938, Szálasi's followers became more radical in their political activities, and Szálasi was arrested and imprisoned by the Hungarian Police. However, even while in prison Szálasi managed to remain a powerful political figure, and was proclaimed leader of the National Socialist Arrow Cross Party (a coalition of several right-wing groups) when it was expanded in 1938. The party attracted a large number of followers, and in the 1939 elections, it gained 30 seats in the elected Lower House of the Hungarian Parliament, thus becoming one of the more powerful parties in Hungary. In the 1939 election, the Arrow Cross won 25% of the vote and would had almost certainly won more seats were not for the way that most Hungarians were disfranchised along with gerrymandering. However, the ruling Party of Hungarian Life won 179 seats in the election, making the Arrow Cross a distant second. Furthermore, the conservative prime minister Pál Teleki on 5 May 1939 brought in the Second Anti-Jewish Law, which limited Jews to holding only 6% of all the jobs in any given profession, which satisfied many of the Arrow Cross supporters, and in this way Teleki won over many of the Arrow Cross voters. The Regent of Hungary, Admiral Miklós Horthy, met Szálasi twice and he came away unimpressed, saying that Szálasi was "an idiot".

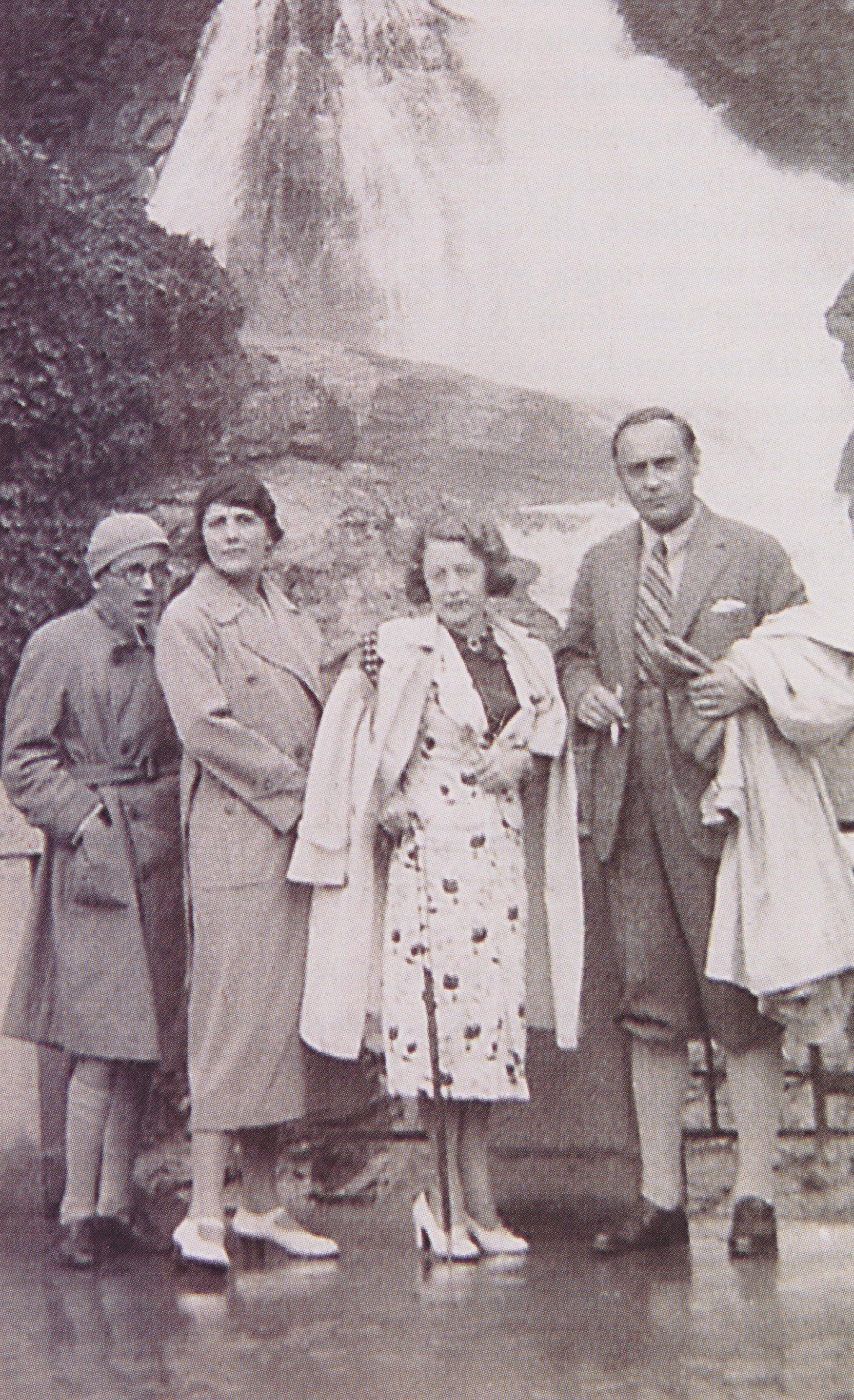
Szálasi on vacation in Germany, 1940.

When World War II began, the Arrow Cross Party was officially banned by Prime Minister Pál Teleki, thus forcing Szálasi to operate in secret. During this period, Szálasi gained the support and backing of the Germans, who had previously been opposed to Szálasi because his Hungarist nationalism placed Hungarian territorial claims above those of Germany. Freed due to a general amnesty resulting from the Second Vienna Award in 1940, Szálasi returned to politics. In late 1940, the Germans wanted Szálasi to merge his party into the Party of Hungarian Renewal led by the former prime minister Béla Imrédy with Szálasi serving as a deputy leader to Imrédy, a demand that Szálasi rejected. Unhappy at being cut off from German funding, Szálasi visited the Japanese legation in Budapest a number of times in 1943-1944 to ask for Japanese funding of the Arrow Cross. By the early 1940s, Szálasi's eccentricities, his intense paranoia, his fanatical sense of mission and his tendency to say bizarre things both in public and in private left several of his senior followers convinced that he had gone insane and urgently needed to be examined by a doctor. Szálasi suffered from what the Hungarian historian Zoltán Paksy called "a serious neurotic disorder" which was reflected in varying ways such as Szálasi's fanaticism, his belief that he was chosen by God, and above all in Szálasi's progressively losing contact with reality as time went by. However, Pasky noted that Szálasi's madness actually helped his career as he noted "his followers thought that behind Szálasi's addle-brained deeds and speeches lay something magical, a form of superior leadership, which they therefore simply could not fully comprehend". Szálasi's diary, which he kept faithfully from 1940 onward, became increasing violent as time went on. In a typical entry from December 1943, he wrote that all of Hungary's leaders were "vile, worthless rascals due to Jewish poison".

=== Way to power ===
Following the Nazi occupation of Hungary in March 1944, the pro-German Döme Sztójay was installed as Prime Minister of Hungary. The Arrow Cross Party was then legalized by the government, allowing Szálasi to expand the party. When Sztójay was deposed in August, Szálasi once again became an enemy of the Hungarian government and Regent Miklós Horthy ordered his arrest. By this time, Horthy realized that Hungary's position was untenable, and began putting out feelers to the Allies. The Germans were concerned that Horthy would succeed in extricating Hungary from the war. They had, however, waiting in the wings, a perfect ally in Szálasi.

When the Germans learned of the Regent's plan to come to a separate peace with the Soviets and exit the Axis alliance, they kidnapped Horthy's son, Miklós, Jr. and threatened to kill him unless Horthy abdicated in favor of Szálasi. Under duress, Horthy signed a document announcing his own abdication and naming Szálasi prime minister–effectively giving "legal sanction" to an Arrow Cross coup. In his memoirs, Horthy contended the appointment of Szálasi was invalid, saying, "A signature wrung from a man at machine-gun point can have little legality." The Germans then pressured Parliament to install Szálasi as Head of State as well.

=== Leader of the Nation ===
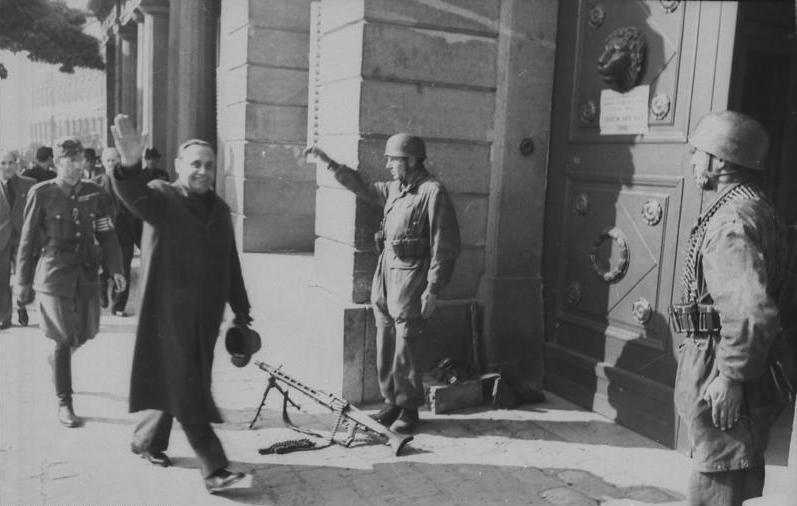
Ferenc Szálasi in Budapest, October 1944.

Szálasi's Government of National Unity turned the Kingdom of Hungary into a puppet state of Nazi Germany formed on 16 October 1944 after Regent of Hungary Miklós Horthy was removed from power during Operation Panzerfaust (Unternehmen Eisenfaust).

The Hungarian parliament approved the formation of a Council of Regency (Kormányzótanács) of three. On 4 November, Szálasi was sworn as Leader of the Nation (nemzetvezető). He formed a government of sixteen ministers, half of which were members of the Arrow Cross Party. While the Horthy regency had come to an end, the Hungarian monarchy was not abolished by the Szálasi regime, as government newspapers kept referring to the country as the Kingdom of Hungary (Magyar Királyság, also abbreviated as m.kir.), although Magyarország (Hungary) was frequently used as an alternative.

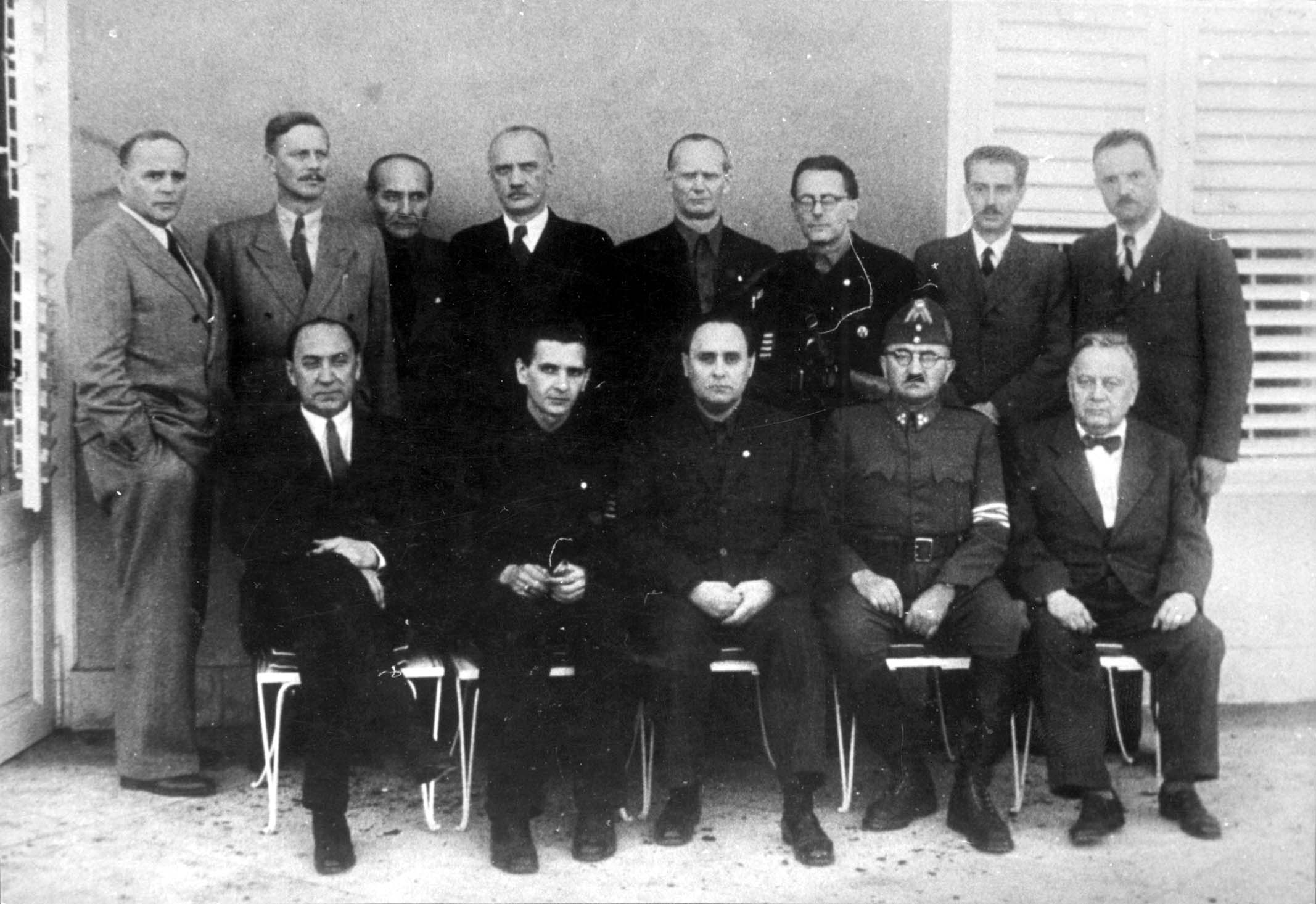
The Government of National Unity headed by Ferenc Szálasi (sitting in the center).

Szálasi and his "Quisling government" had little other intention or ability but to execute the party's ideology and to maintain control in Nazi-occupied portions of Hungary as the Soviet Union invaded. He did this in order to reduce the threat to Germany. Szálasi's aim was to create a one-party state based on Hungarism. On 3 November 1944, Szálasi took his oath before God as the Nemzetvezető ("Leader of the Nation") at the Royal Castle before the Holy Crown of Saint István, becoming both head of state and head of government. Only 55 MPs of the 370 serving in the Lower House attended the ceremony. Almost all of the civil servants along with most of the Honved officer corps recognised Szálasi's claim to be the Nemzetvezető. Cardinal Seredi of Budapest, the Prince Primate of Hungary, also recognised Szálasi as he ordered all Catholic priests and Catholic school teachers to serve the new regime. Szálasi himself was astonished at the way that most of the civil service, the judiciary, the military, the police and the Royal Hungarian Gendarmerie accepted his regime as he expected far more passive resistance and a wave of resignations. The German minister-plenipotentiary in Budapest, SS-Brigadeführer Edmund Veesenmayer, had a low opinion of him as he later told the British historian C.A. Macartney that Szálasi was "a buffoon who alternatively swaggered and grovelled" while his followers were "a gang of fantasists". Szálasi envisioned a far-reaching transformation of society as he proposed laws that would had sterilized all gay Hungarians; made marriage between "fertile" and "barren" Hungarians illegal; and would had imposed severe legal penalties on any "fertile" men and women who did not marry and have children. The Family Law that Szálasi wrote in late 1944 called for castrating all "people burdened with abnormal sexual instinct" (i.e male homosexuals) along with men infected with venereal diseases and all Jewish men and Romany men who had sex with non-Jewish and non-Romany women.

Szálasi's common law wife, Gizella Lutz, hosted a salon attended by the other wives and mistresses of the Arrow Cross leaders who met regularly for tea and biscuits. The wife of Ference Kassi, the propaganda minister in Szálasi's cabinet, recalled at her trial in 1946: "We women gathered at the invitation of Gizella Lutz. We discussed a variety of problems, also addressed political topics. We spoke about the coming victory of the Arrow Cross Party". One of Szálasi's first acts was to raise the monthly sum paid to the Reich in exchange for the defense of Hungary from 200 million pengő to 300 million pengő, which imposed a considerable financial burden on all Hungarians who faced increased taxes. Another early act of Szálasi's was to hand over the former prime minister Miklós Kállay to the Germans, who imprisoned Kallay in a concentration camp. Szálasi launched a plan to turn Hungary into a "corporate state" based upon the example of Fascist Italy, but very little was accomplished. He also envisioned a greater Hungary as he wanted to take back all of the Lands of the Crown of St. István to Hungary and planned to rename the Kingdom of Hungary as the Hungarian United Ancient Lands.

Under his rule as a close ally of Germany, the Germans, with the assistance of the Szálasi government, recommenced the deportation of the Jews, which had been suspended by Horthy. He organised the so-called International Ghetto. During that time some diplomats like Raoul Wallenberg gave protective passports to some Jews, which protected them from deportation. The Germans argued they weren't valid according to international law, but Szálasi's government accepted them nevertheless. His government promoted martial law and courts-martial, and executed those who were considered dangerous for the state and the continuation of the war. During Szálasi's rule, Hungarian tangible assets (cattle, machinery, wagons, industrial raw materials, etc.) were sent to Germany. He conscripted young and old into the remaining Hungarian Army and sent them into hopeless battles against the Red Army.

Szálasi's rule only lasted 163 days, partly because by the time he took power, the Red Army was already deep inside Hungary. For all intents and purposes, his authority was limited to a narrowing band in the centre of the country, including Budapest. Szálasi did not want to defend Budapest, saying at a press conference in October 1944: "I would regard it as necessary to hold Budapest only if offensive operations were to be undertaken from there. However if this is not intended, Budapest must be definitely evacuated and we must make a strategic retreat to the Transdanubian hills". At another press conference in early November 1944, he stated: "The "Germans want to gain time by defending Budapest". On 2 November 1944, Szálasi called a meeting of the Crown Council at the Royal Castle, where the main subject of discussion was Hungarian-Japanese relations and he left the crown council meeting without commenting on the military situation despite the fact that the roar of Soviet artillery and rockets could be heard quite clearly in the Castle district.

On 3 November 1944, Szálasi met with General Johannes Frießner, the commander of the German forces in Hungary, to tell him that his government could only engage in "damage limitation" as the Red Army had already entered the suburbs of Budapest and to ask him to provide arms for the 300, 000 men he intended to call up for national service. Szálasi also asked Frießner to not defend Budapest, whose people he deemed "the metropolitan mob" who were not to be trusted. Szálasi stated that Budapest was a stronghold of liberals and leftists and he was not certain that the Arrow Cross could put down an uprising in Budapest, which Szálasi expected to break out at any moment. Frießner shared Szálasi's assessment of the people of Budapest and asked Berlin to send him a SS general with experience in upholding "law and order" along with "assault pioneer battalions as in Warsaw", which suggested that intended to raze Budapest much in the same way that Warsaw had just been razed. Despite Szálasi's wishes, Adolf Hitler insisted that Budapest be declared a fortress city that was to defended to the last bullet. Szálasi did not order a general evacuation of Budapest and thus condemned almost all of the population of Budapest to enduring one of the most savage and fiercely fought battles on the Eastern Front. The only people evacuated from Budapest were those Szálasi considered valuable such as senior Arrow Cross leaders, scientists, and university professors with the rest of the population of Budapest forbidden to leave.

On 19 November 1944, Szálasi was in the Hungarian capital when Soviet and Romanian forces began encircling it. By the time the city was encircled and the 102-day Siege of Budapest began, he was gone. The "Leader of the Nation" (Nemzetvezető) fled to Szombathely on 9 December. During the siege, the Arrow Cross militiamen were mostly noted for their massacres of the surviving Jews of Budapest who were usually marched to the banks of the Danube river and shot down. Guns were the usual weapons used by the Arrow Cross militiamen, but in order to save ammunition the victims were sometimes beaten to death with truncheons or with the bare hands of the militiamen. As much of the male Hungarian Jewish population had been already killed while serving in the labour service battalions of the Royal Hungarian Army or exterminated at Auschwitz, a disproportionate number of the victims of the massacres were women and children. The Hungarian historian Krisztián Ungváry wrote: "Nowhere else in Nazi-occupied Western Europe were people publicly killed in such large numbers merely because of their origins and in the Soviet Union such events ceased after the early phrase of the occupation". The bulk of the killing was done by the Arrow Cross militia, but they were often assisted by policemen, gendarmes, and Honved soldiers. However, the tendency of the Arrow Cross to take literally Szálasi's degree that any soldier found not fighting at the front was to be viewed as deserter and therefore should be taken out and shot caused tense relations between the Arrow Cross and the Honved as many soldiers feared the Arrow Cross militiamen as much as the enemy. Ungváry argued that the massacres reflected a profound "moral crisis" in society as many people regarded watching visibly intoxicated and goonish Arrow Cross militiamen marching women and children down to the banks of the Danube and shooting them as normal behavior with the major complaint being the smell of the corpses and the sight of so much blood along the frozen Danube. Ungváry added: "For Szálasi and his gang making Hungary "Jew free" seemed to be more important than anything-perhaps even winning the war. There can be no other explanation for their totally irrational behavior, the sole purpose of which was to humiliate, eliminate and annihilate the Jews". Even some of the other Arrow Cross leaders questioned the usefulness of the massacres of Jews at a time when Budapest was barely holding out in the face of the Red Army's onslaught, but were overruled. Despite the desperate situation in Budapest, in December 1944 Szálasi refused an offer of help from the International Red Cross because the Red Cross promised to provide aid for all the people of Budapest including those in the ghetto, which Szálasi considered to be unacceptable Through Szálasi was out of Budapest at the time of the massacres, his prestige among the Arrow Cross members was very high and had he given his orders, the massacres in Budapest would had stopped. The majority of the victims were Jews, but other people taken out and shot by the Arrow Cross militiamen included deserters from the Honved; people with high incomes, who were usually killed in order to loot their assets; people who were protecting and sheltering the Jews; and people who in the words of the Hungarian historian Laszlo Borhi were simply "in the wrong place at the wrong time". By March 1945, Szálasi was in Vienna just prior to the Vienna Offensive.

Later, he fled to Munich. On 29 April 1945, he married his long-time common wife Gizella Lutz. In the last meeting of his cabinet on 1 May 1945, Szálasi predicated that the war would still be won as he believed that Britain needed an alliance with Hungary to stop the "Bolsheviks" from overrunning Europe and the combined Anglo-Hungarian forces would defeat the Soviet Union. Szálasi believed that despite leading a government-in-exile in Munich, he had the upper hand in the projected talks for an alliance with Britain, and planned to impose conditions such as British support for a greater Hungary as the prerequisite for the planned Anglo-Hungarian alliance and a British declaration of war on the Soviet Union.

== Trial and execution ==
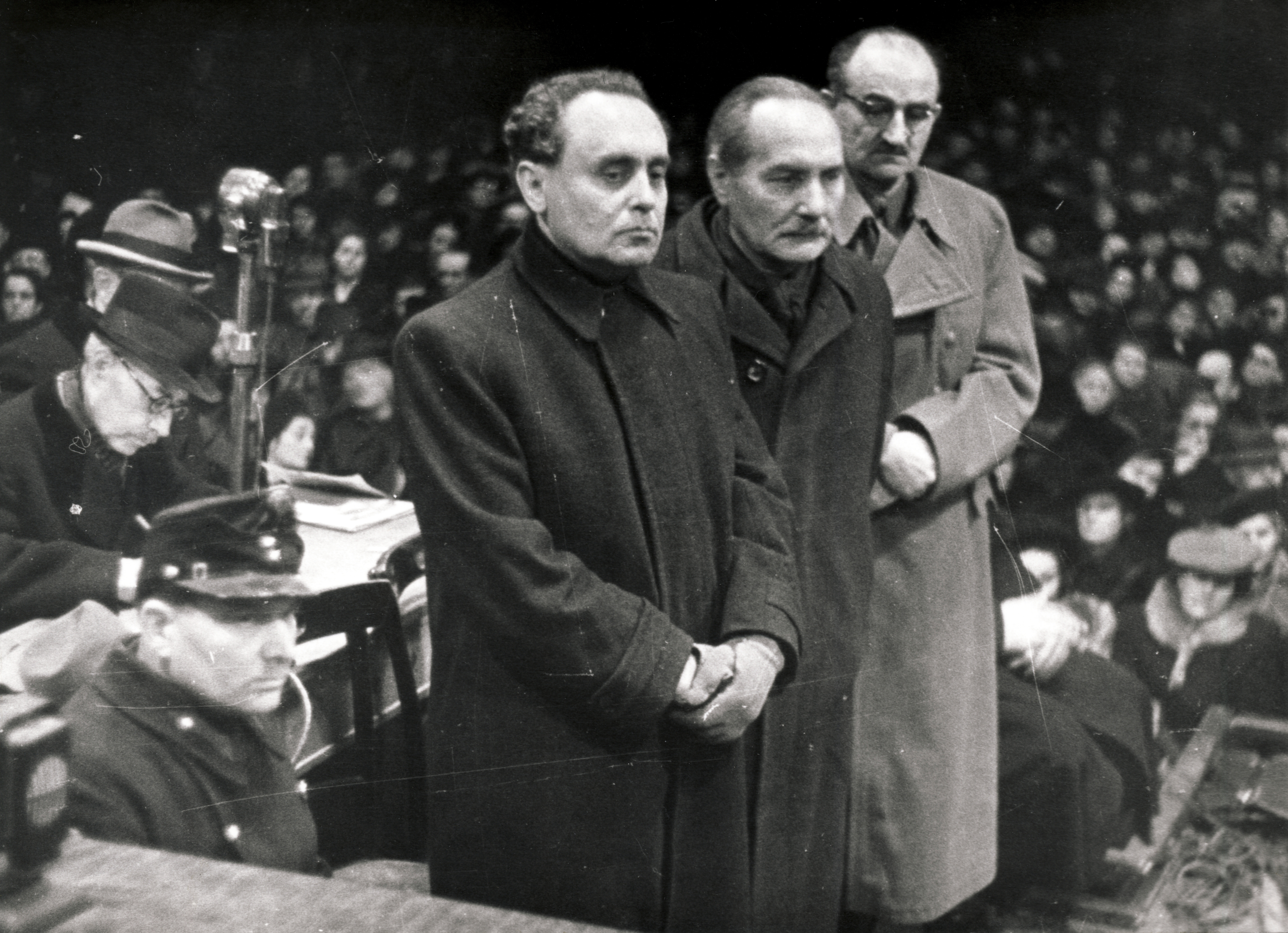
Ferenc Szálasi before the People's Court at his trial

The Arrow Cross Party's cabinet, which had fled Hungary, was dissolved on 7 May 1945, a day before Germany's surrender. Szálasi was captured by American troops in Mattsee on 6 May and returned to Hungary on 3 October. He was tried by the People's Tribunal in Budapest in open sessions begun in February 1946, and sentenced to death for war crimes and high treason. Of all the Hungarian leaders brought to trial for war crimes, Szálasi was the one who made the very worst impression while he was on the stand. The Hungarian historian Peter Kenez wrote that Szálasi "was so out of touch with reality that he could fairly be described as mad". In his defense, Szálasi made bizarre and strange statements that made sense only to himself and insisted on being addressed as "the Nemzetvezetô" (the Hungarian equivalent to the German der Führer). On the stand, Szálasi cut a figure that was both pathetically deluded and repulsively vicious as he made rambling, incoherent speeches about the secret Masonic coded messages supposedly contained in the speeches of world leaders while at the same time insisting that all of the atrocities committed by the Arrow Cross regime were justified. To the extent that Szálasi had a coherent defense that was expressed in his rambling speeches, it was that he was an idealist on a mission from God to save Hungary from the Jews by creating a synthesis of socialism and nationalism that would be a third way between communism and capitalism and that because everything he did was motivated by a love of Jesus Christ that this justified shooting down Jewish women and children in cold blood.

Szálasi was hanged on 12 March 1946 in Budapest, along with two of his former ministers, Gábor Vajna and Károly Beregfy, and the party ideologist József Gera. The hanging was conducted in the Austrian pole method. A large post had a rope attached to a hook at the top. Szálasi was marched up steps, placed with his back to the post, his legs and arms were tied, the noose placed around his neck, the rope tightened, and the steps were removed. With the post only leaving a couple feet between Szálasi and the ground it is likely that he died slowly due to strangulation rather than being instantaneously rendered unconscious and dying shortly after as would happen when utilizing the standard drop. This would also explain why his arms and legs were bound as to prevent struggle during the process. Before being executed, Szálasi received the last sacraments by a Catholic priest.

Thirty-two photos of the hanging were donated to the United States Holocaust Memorial Museum. Other photographs of the execution are on display in the Holocaust Room of the Budapest Jewish Museum. Szálasi's widow, Lutz, was convicted twice by the People's Tribunals on 22 November 1945 and again on 19 June 1946 of abuse of power, theft of Jewish property, and of promoting the Arrow Cross. After 11 years in prison, she was released at the time of the 1956 revolution. She thereafter lived in an apartment in Budapest until her death in 1992. In 1991, she was featured in the documentary Itélettlenül (Without Verdict) by Tamás Almási, where she held up a photograph of Szálasi shaking hands with Hitler, and then spoke with tears in her eyes about what a "great man" her husband had been whose name she believed had been maligned.

On 13 March 1946, the day after Szálasi's death, the National Council of People's Tribunals discussed the convicted politicians' plea for mercy and recommended its refusal to Justice Minister István Ries, when Szálasi and his ministers were already executed. Ries forwarded the decision to President Zoltán Tildy, who subsequently approved the death sentence and execution on 15 March 1946.

Szálasi was buried in Rákoskeresztúr New Public Cemetery in the Budapest Capital District, Budapest, Hungary, plot 298. In 2008, historian Tamás Kovács claimed the Political Department of the Hungarian State Police (PRO; predecessor of the feared secret police State Protection Authority) falsified his name and birth certificate, and buried him as "Ferenc Lukács" in section 298 of the New Public Cemetery. Other historians, however, rejected this claim, since no written source could be found.

== See also ==
- Cluj Ghetto
- Hungarian Turanism

== Sources and further reading ==
- Ablonczy, Balázs (2022). Go East! A History of Hungarian Turanism. Bloomington: Indiana University Press. ISBN 9780253057433.
- Borhi, Laszlo (2024). Survival under Dictatorships: Life and Death in Nazi and Communist Regimes. Budapest: Central European Press.
- Cohen, Asher. “Continuity in the Change: Hungary, 19 March 1944.” Jewish Social Studies 46, no. 2 (1984): 131–44. http://www.jstor.org/stable/4467252.
- Cohen, Asher. "Some Socio-Political Aspects of the Arrow Cross Party in Hungary." East European Quarterly 21.3 (1987): 369+
- Cornelius, Deborah S (2011). Hungary in World War II: Caught in the Cauldron. New York: Fordham University Press. ISBN 978-0823233441.
- Eby, Cecil D. (2010). Hungary at War Civilians and Soldiers in World War II. University Park: Pennsylvania State University Press. ISBN 9780271040882.
- Deak, Istvan. "Collaborationism in Europe, 1940–1945: The Case of Hungary." Austrian History Yearbook 15 (1979): 157–164.
- Deák, István. "A fatal compromise? The debate over collaboration and resistance in Hungary." East European Politics and Societies 9.2 (1995): 209–233.
- Deák, István. “Hungary” in Hans Rogger and Egon Weber, eds., The European Right: A Historical Profile (1963) pp. 364–407.
- Hanebrink, Paul (2018). In Defense of Christian Hungary Religion, Nationalism, and Antisemitism, 1890–1944. Ithaca: Cornell University Press. ISBN 9781501727269.
- Herczl, Moshe Y. Christianity and the Holocaust of Hungarian Jewry (1993) pp 79–170. online
- Klay, Andor (March 1974). "Hungarian Counterfeit Francs: A Case of Post-World War I Political Sabotage". Slavic Review. 33 (1): 107–113. doi:10.2307/2495329. JSTOR 2495329.
- Kenez, Peter (2006). Hungary from the Nazis to the Soviets The Establishment of the Communist Regime in Hungary, 1944-1948. Cambridge: Cambridge University Press. ISBN 9780521857666.
- Kurimay, Anita (2020). Queer Budapest, 1873–1961. Chicago: University of Chicago Press. ISBN 9780226705828.
- Janos, Andrew (2012). The Politics of Backwardness in Hungary, 1825-1945. Princeton: Princeton University Press. ISBN 9781400843022.
- Lackó, M. Arrow-Cross Men: National Socialists 1935–1944 (Budapest, Akadémiai Kiadó 1969).
- Morgan, Philip (2003). Fascism in Europe, 1919-1945. London: Routeledge. ISBN 9780415169431.
- Fiala-Marschalkó: Vádló bitófák. London: Süli, 1958
- Paksy, Zoltán (Fall 2016). "Review of Szálasi Ferenc: Politikai életrajz". The Hungarian Historical Review. 5 (4): 921–923.
- Pető, Andrea (2020). The Women of the Arrow Cross Party Invisible Hungarian Perpetrators in the Second World War. New York: Springer International Publishing. ISBN 9783030512255.
- Rozsnyói, Á. “October Fifteenth, 1944: (History of Szálasi’s Putsch).” Acta Historica Academiae Scientiarum Hungaricae 8, no. 1/2 (1961): 57–105. http://www.jstor.org/stable/42554680.
- Thomas, Dr. Nigel, and, Szabo, Laszlo Pal (2008). The Royal Hungarian Army in World war II. New York: Osprey Publishing. p. 48. ISBN 978-1-84603-324-7.
- Ungváry, Krisztián (2006). The Battle for Budapest 100 Days in World War II. London: Bloomsbury Publishing. ISBN 9780857710710.
- Vági, Zoltán; Csosz, László; Kádár, Gábor (2013). The Holocaust in Hungary Evolution of a Genocide. Walnut Creek: AltaMira Press. ISBN 9780759122000.

Political offices
Preceded by Miklós Horthy (as regent)	Leader of the Nation; 1944–1945	Succeeded by High National Council
Preceded by Géza Lakatos	Prime Minister of Hungary (de facto); 1944–1945	Succeeded by Béla Miklós
Preceded by Ferenc Rajniss	Minister of Religion and Education; Acting; 1945	Succeeded by Géza Teleki
