= International Ghetto =

International Ghetto was a tetragonal region in of apartment buildings in the Újlipótváros section of Pest (Budapest) for diplomatically protected Jews during World War II. It was bounded by Pozsonyi út, Szent István park, Újpesti rakpart, Sziget út. It was established by the government of Ferenc Szálasi, Leader of the Hungarian Nation, after his rise to power on 15 October 1944.
