= Tamás Almási =

Hungarian film director

Almasi, Tamas
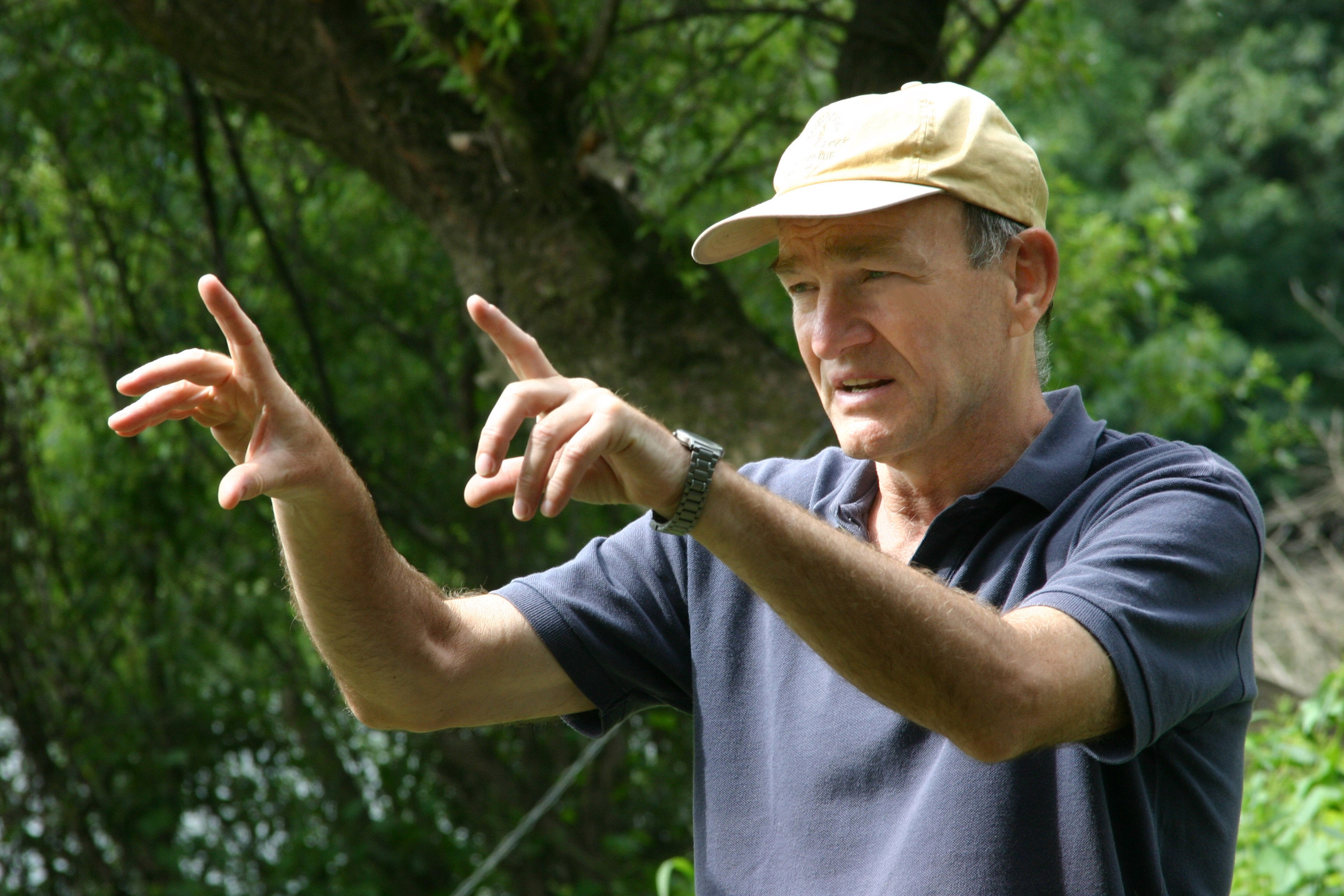
- Born: 26 July 1948 (age 77); Székesfehérvár
- Known for: Art, Film

Tamás Almási (born 26 July 1948 in Székesfehérvár) is a Hungarian documentary film director. He directs but sometimes also photographs his own films. So far he has made more than forty full-length documentaries and some movie fiction films, which have been screened at a number of highly prestigious festivals in Europe and overseas earning him numerous awards. His films have been broadcast around forty countries. He has been awarded the highest Hungarian artistic distinction the Kossuth price.

He graduated at the University of Theatre and Film Arts, Budapest as a film director in 1979. He has also been teaching filmmaking at the University of Theatre and Film Arts, Budapest since 1999. In 2005 he obtained his DLA (Doctor of Liberal Arts). Currently he is a professor at this university. He is best known for the Ózd Series, a series of documentaries about the Ózd steelworks.

== Selected filmography ==
- tititá (Original title -tititá) (documentary film) (2015) (Writer, Producer, Director)
- Puskás Hungary (Original title - Puskás Hungary) (documentary film) (2009) (Director)
- Mario the Magician (Original title - Márió a varázsló) (feature film) (2008) (Screenplay, Director)
- Our Own Little Europe (Original title - A mi kis Európánk) (documentary film) (2006) (Cinematographer)
- From Home to Home (Original title -Valahol otthon lenni) (documentary film) (2003) (Cinematographer, Director)
- From Home to Home (Original title -Valahol otthon lenni) (3x55 min.TV series) (2003)
- The end of the Road (Original title - Az út vége) (documentary film) (2003) (Cinematographer, Writer, Director)
- Kitüntetetten (Documentary) (2002) (Producer, Director)
- Our Cells (Original title - Sejtjeink) (documentary film ) (2002) (Cinematographer, Director)
- Down and out (Original title - Alagsor) (documentary film) (2001) (Cinematographer, Writer, Producer, Editor, Director)
- More than love (Original title - Szerelem első hallásra) (documentary film) (1999)
- Helpless / Sans espoir (Original title - Tehetetlenül) (documentary film) (1998) (Cinematographer, Director
- The matter of the heart / Mon affaire de coeur (Original title - Szívügyem) (documentary film) (1996) (Cinematographer, Editor, Director)
- Barren / Déchets (Original title - Meddő) (documentary film) (1995)
- Találkozás (1994) Director
- The Factory is Ours (Original title - Miénk a gyár) (documentary film) (1993) (Cinematographer, Director)
- Lassítás (Documentary) (1992) (Director)
- Women condemned (Original title - Ítéletlenül) (documentary film) (1991) (Studio chief, Director)
- In a vise / L’etau (Original title - Szorításban ) (documentary film) (1987)
- Hajdúszoboszlói képek (Documentary short) (1983) (Writer, Director)
- I was your kid (Original title - Kölyköd voltam) (documentary film) (1983) (Director)
- Van közünk hozzá (documentary short) (1983) (Writer, Director)
- Graduation (Original title - Ballagás) (feature film) (1980) (Writer, Director)
- Circus maximus (1980) (Co-director)
- How long does the tree live? (Original title - Meddig él egy fa?) (short feature film) (1976)
- Tűzgömbök (1975) (Assistant to director)
- The Fortress (Original title - Az erőd) (1979) (assistant director)
- 141 Minutes from the Unfinished Sentence (Original title - 141 perc a befejezetlen mondatból (1975) (assistant director)
- 25 Fireman's Street (Original title - Tűzoltó utca 25.) (1973) (assistant director)
- One Day More, One Day Less (Original title - Plusz-mínusz egy nap (1973) (assistant director)
- Meztelen vagy (1972) (assistant director)
- Red Psalm (Original title - Még kér a nép (1972) (second assistant director)

== Hungarian Film Festivals, Awards ==
- Main Prize Documentary Film Category, Hungarian Film Week 6 times: 1993, 1998, 1999, 2000, 2002, 2010
- Hungarian Film Critiques' Award: 1993, 1997, 1999, 2003, 2010
- Best First Film, Special Award, Hungarian Film Week 1981
- Main Prize, Category Prize, Camera Hungaria 1999
- Category Prize, Camera Hungaria 2010
- Main Prize, Best Documentary Prize, Television Festival at Miskolc 1988

== International Film Festivals, Awards ==
- Special Jury Prize, 2015 – 21st Sarajevo Film Festival
- Main Prize 54. Semana International De Cine, Valladolid 2009
- Silver Remy Prize, Houston World Fest 2009
- Prage, Bratislava: One World Festival (2009.)
- Wien: Human World Film Festival (2009.)
- Cairo International Film Festival 2008
- Gold Prize of the Jury, Houston World Fest 2005
- Qualification for the competition 75th Annual Academy Awards 2003
- 2004: Copenhagen International Documentary Film Festival
- 2004: 8th Jihlava International Documentary Film Festival, Market
- FIPA, Biarritz 1997, 2002
- Special mention of Prix International de la SCAM, Cinema du Réel, Paris 1999
- Silver Plaque, International Television Competition, Chicago 1998
- Golden Gate Awards, Certificate of Merit, San Francisco 1997
- Special mention for documentary Karlovy Vary 1997
- Documentary Awards Special Commendation, Prix Italia Television Naples 1996
- Prix Europa, Berlin 1992, 1996
- Silver Sestertius Award, Nyon Documentary Festival 1992
- Prix Italia, Bologna 2001
- Prix Italia, Parma 1992
- INPUT festival (1987, 1992)
- Main Prize Cilect Festival, Washington 1978

== Professional awards ==
- 2010 Kossuth award - Hungary's highest cultural award
- 2005 Outstanding Artist of the Hungarian Republic
- 2003 Honorary Citizen of the City of Székesfehérvár
- 2002 Order of Merit of the Hungarian Republic Knight’s Cross
- 1999 Pulitzer Memorial Prize in Hungary
- 1998 Award for Hungarian Culture
- 1998 Bezerédj-Award
- 1995 Balázs Béla Award
