= The Holocaust in Hungary =

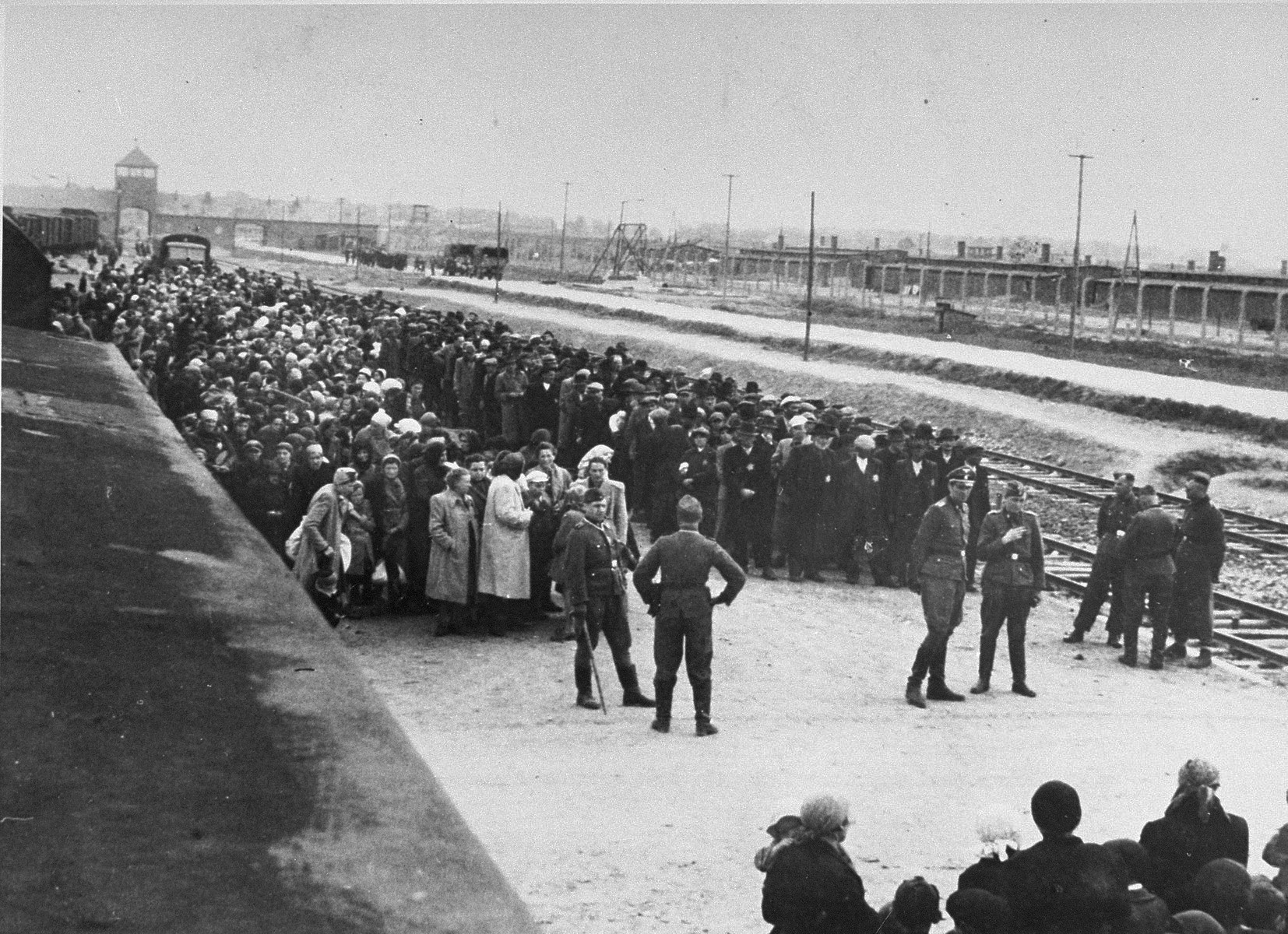
- Hungarian Jews arriving at Auschwitz II-Birkenau, German-occupied Poland, May/June 1944

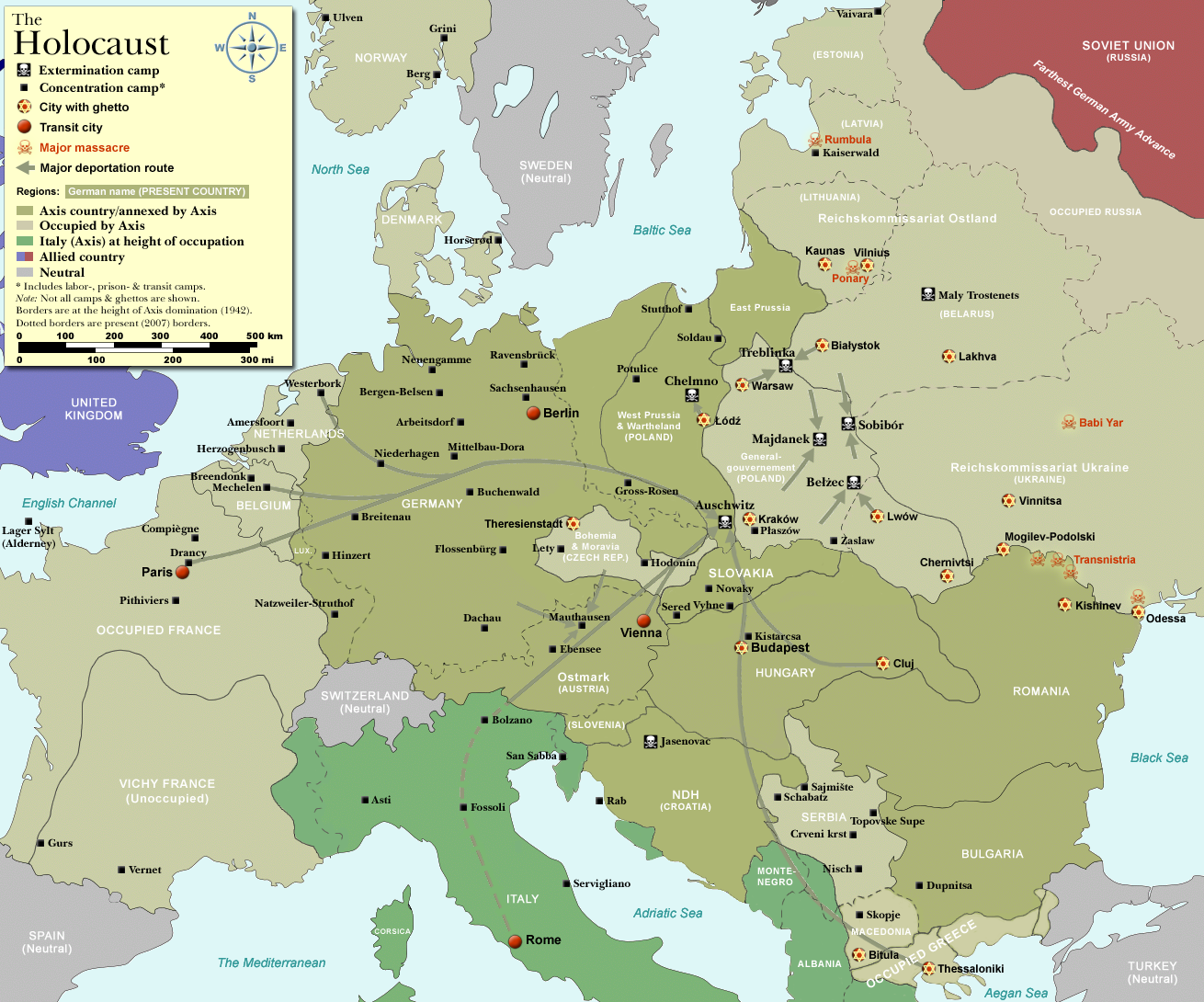
- Europe in 1942
- Location: Hungary
- Date: April 1944 – 13 February 1945; (mainly 15 May – 9 July 1944)
- Perpetrators: Kingdom of Hungary, Nazi Germany, Adolf Eichmann, László Ferenczy, Arrow Cross Party
- Camp: Auschwitz concentration camp
- Ghetto: Budapest ghetto
- Victims: 564,000 dead (1941–1945); incl. over 434,000 (15 May–9 July 1944)
- Memorials: Shoes on the Danube Bank

The Holocaust saw the dispossession, deportation and systematic murder of more than half of the Hungarian Jews, primarily after the German occupation of Hungary in March 1944. Before that, several incidents took place, including The Raid in 1942, the murders of the majority of Jews in Novi Sad and south-eastern Bačka.

At the time of the German invasion, Hungary had a Jewish population of 825,000, the largest remaining in Europe, further swollen by Jews escaping from elsewhere to the relative safety of that country. The Hungarian Prime Minister Miklós Kállay had been reluctant to deport them. Fearing Hungary was trying to pursue peace with the Allies (which the diplomat László Veress secretly did in the September of 1943), Adolf Hitler ordered the invasion. New restrictions against Jews were imposed soon after Germany occupied Hungary on 19 March 1944. The invading troops included a Sonderkommando which was led by SS officer Adolf Eichmann, who arrived in Budapest in order to supervise the deportation of the country's Jews to the Auschwitz concentration camp in occupied Poland. Between 15 May and 9 July 1944, over 434,000 Jews were deported on 147 trains, most of them to Auschwitz, where about 80 percent were gassed on arrival. The quick progress of the deportations was enabled by close cooperation between the Hungarian and German authorities.

Diplomatic pressure and the Allied bombing of Budapest persuaded Miklós Horthy, the Regent of Hungary, to order a halt to the deportations on 6 July. By the time they had stopped three days later, almost the entire community of Jews in the Hungarian countryside had gone. (Note: Randolph Braham (2011): "[F]rom May 15 through July 9 [1944], close to 440,000 of the Jews of Hungary were deported to Auschwitz–Birkenau, where most of them were murdered soon after their arrival. By July 9, when Horthy's decision to halt the deportations took effect, all of Hungary (with the notable exception of Budapest) had become judenrein.")

The mass deportation of Hungarian Jews was the largest Holocaust killing after 1942. It took place as World War II appeared to be drawing to a close — and world leaders had known for some time that Jews were being murdered in gas chambers. The expropriation of Jewish property was useful to achieve Hungarian economic goals and sending the Jews as forced laborers avoided the need to send non-Jewish Hungarians. Those who survived the selection were forced to provide construction and manufacturing labor as part of a last-ditch effort to increase the production of fighter aircraft.

== Jews in Hungary ==
In the 1941 census, the population of Hungary was 14,683,323. Of these, 725,005 regarded themselves as Jews (4.94 percent) and another 100,000 were Jewish by descent who identified as Christian. Over 400,000 lived in post-Trianon Hungary and another 324,000 lived in territories acquired by Hungary since 1938: Northern Transylvania from Romania (164,000), part of Upper Hungary from Czechoslovakia (146,000), Carpathian Ruthenia (78,000), and Bácska and other areas that had been part of Yugoslavia (14,000).

	Budapest	Provinces	Total	Acquired territories	Total	Source
Jews	184,453	216,528	400,981	324,026	725,007	
Jewish Christians	62,350	27,290	89,640	10,360	100,000	
Total	246,803	243,818	490,621	334,386	825,007	

=== Anti-Jewish Laws (1938–1942) ===
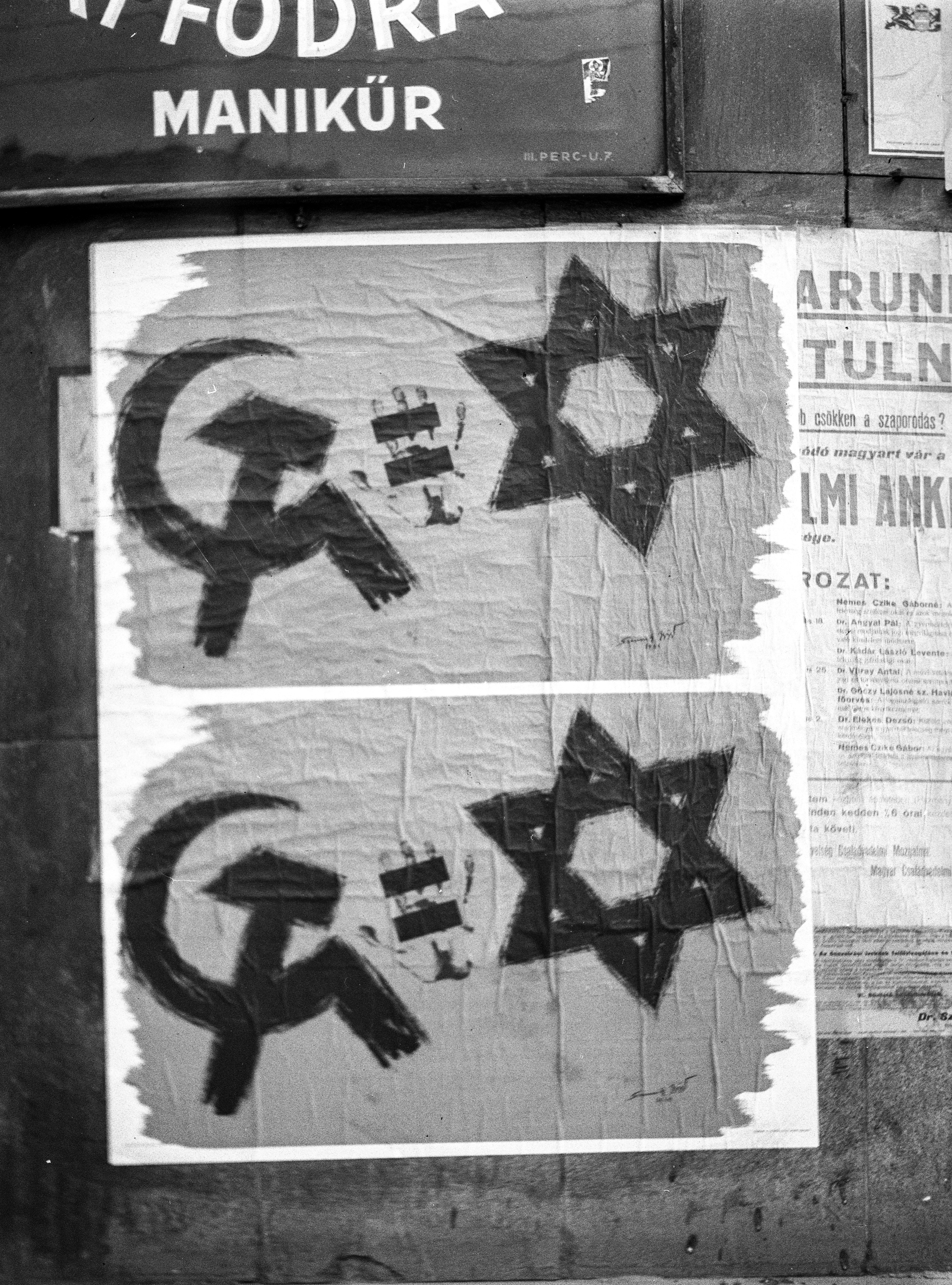
Poster in Budapest, Hungary in 1944 equating the Star of David with the hammer and sickle

Starting in 1938, Hungary under Miklós Horthy passed a series of anti-Jewish measures in emulation of Germany's Nuremberg Laws.

1. The "First Jewish Law" (May 29, 1938) restricted the number of Jews in each commercial enterprise, in the press, among physicians, engineers and lawyers to twenty percent.
2. The "Second Jewish Law" (May 5, 1939), for the first time, defined Jews racially: individuals with two, three or four Jewish-born grandparents were declared Jewish.
3. The "Third Jewish Law" (August 8, 1941) prohibited intermarriage and penalized sexual intercourse between Jews and non-Jews.
4. The "Fourth Jewish Law" (September 6, 1942) banned Jews from owning or purchasing land.

Their employment in government at any level was forbidden, they could not be editors at newspapers, their numbers were restricted to six per cent among theater and movie actors, physicians, lawyers and engineers. Private companies were forbidden to employ more than 12% Jews. 250,000 Hungarian Jews lost their income. Most of them lost their right to vote as well: before the second Jewish law, about 31% of the Jewish population of Borsod county (Miskolc excluded), 2496 people had this right. At the next elections, less than a month after this new anti-Jewish legislation, only 38 privileged Jews could vote.

== Labor battalions ==
Jewish men were excluded from serving in the Hungarian military and were instead conscripted into forced labor service units called munkaszolgálat. These labor battalions operated under the authority of the Hungarian military and were deployed in various areas of the war effort. Conscripted servicemen were assigned to physically demanding tasks such as bridge building and road construction. However, they were also assigned more dangerous tasks such as transporting ammunition, clearing minefields, and burying the dead near battlefields.

== German occupation ==
=== Invasion ===
Adolf Eichmann

On 18 March 1944, Adolf Hitler summoned Horthy to a conference in Austria, where he demanded greater acquiescence from Hungary. Horthy resisted, but his efforts were fruitless. While he was at the conference, German tanks rolled into Budapest, and on 23 March the government of Döme Sztójay was installed. Among his first moves, Sztójay legalized the Arrow Cross Party, which quickly began organizing. During the four days' interregnum following the German occupation, the Ministry of the Interior was placed in the hands of László Endre and László Baky, right-wing politicians known for their hostility to Jews. Their boss, Andor Jaross, was another committed antisemite.

=== Adolf Eichmann ===
SS-Obersturmbannführer Adolf Eichmann, sent to Hungary to supervise the deportations, set up his staff in the Majestic Hotel in Budapest. The Yellow Star and ghettoization laws, and the deportations, were accomplished in less than eight weeks, with the enthusiastic help of the Hungarian authorities, particularly the gendarmerie (csendőrség). The plan was to use 45 cattle cars per train, four trains a day, to deport 12,000 Jews from the countryside every day, starting in mid-May; this was to be followed by the deportation of Jews from Budapest from about 15 July. Rudolf Höss, the first commandant of Auschwitz, returned to the camp between 8 May and 29 July 1944 as the local SS garrison commander to oversee the Hungarian Jews' arrival and gassing. As a result, the Germans called the murders Aktion Höss ("Operation Höss").

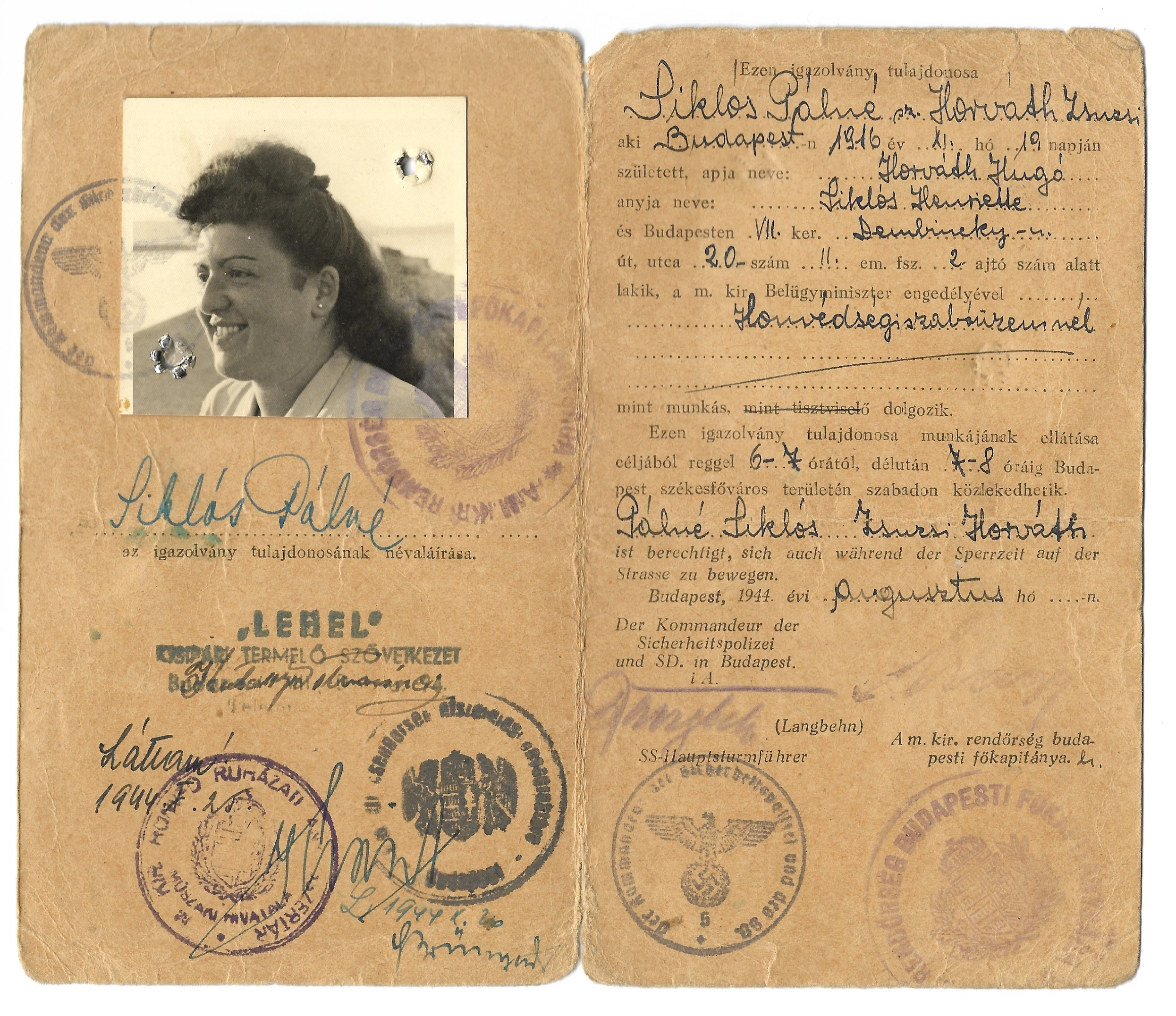
1944 special work ID issued by the SD to a Jewish woman in occupied Budapest.

== Deportation to Auschwitz ==
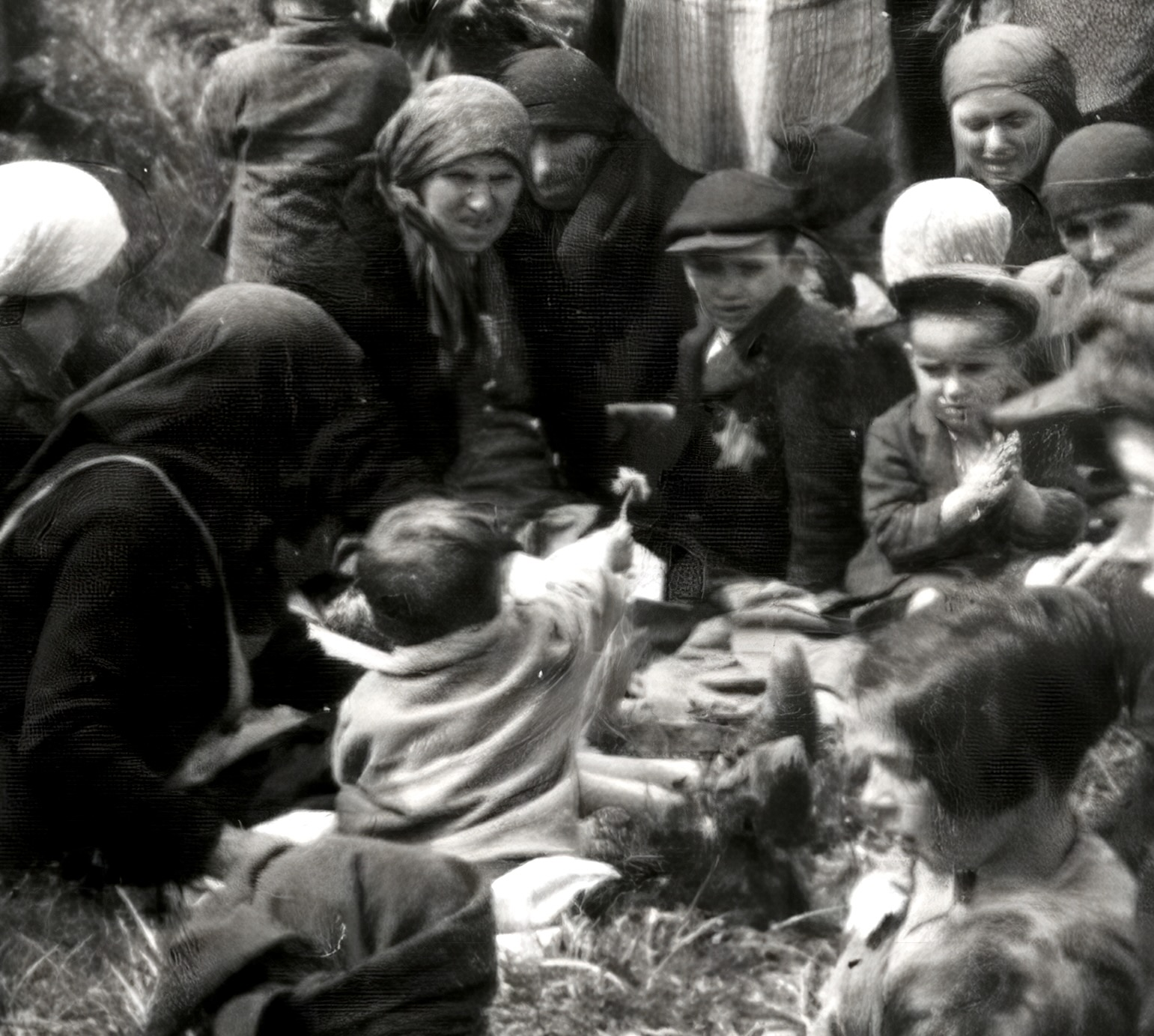
Hungarian Jews after selection in Auschwitz. A little child found a flower in the grass and is giving or showing it to an older boy. All the people in this picture were gassed moments later.

=== First transports ===
The first train left Budapest on 29 April 1944 carrying 1,800 men and women aged 16–50 who were deemed fit to work. A second train left Topolya on 30 April carrying 2,000. The transports went through "selection"; 616 women (serial numbers 76385–76459 and 80000–80540) and 486 men (serial numbers 186645–187130) were chosen to work, and 2,698 were gassed.

=== Mass transports ===
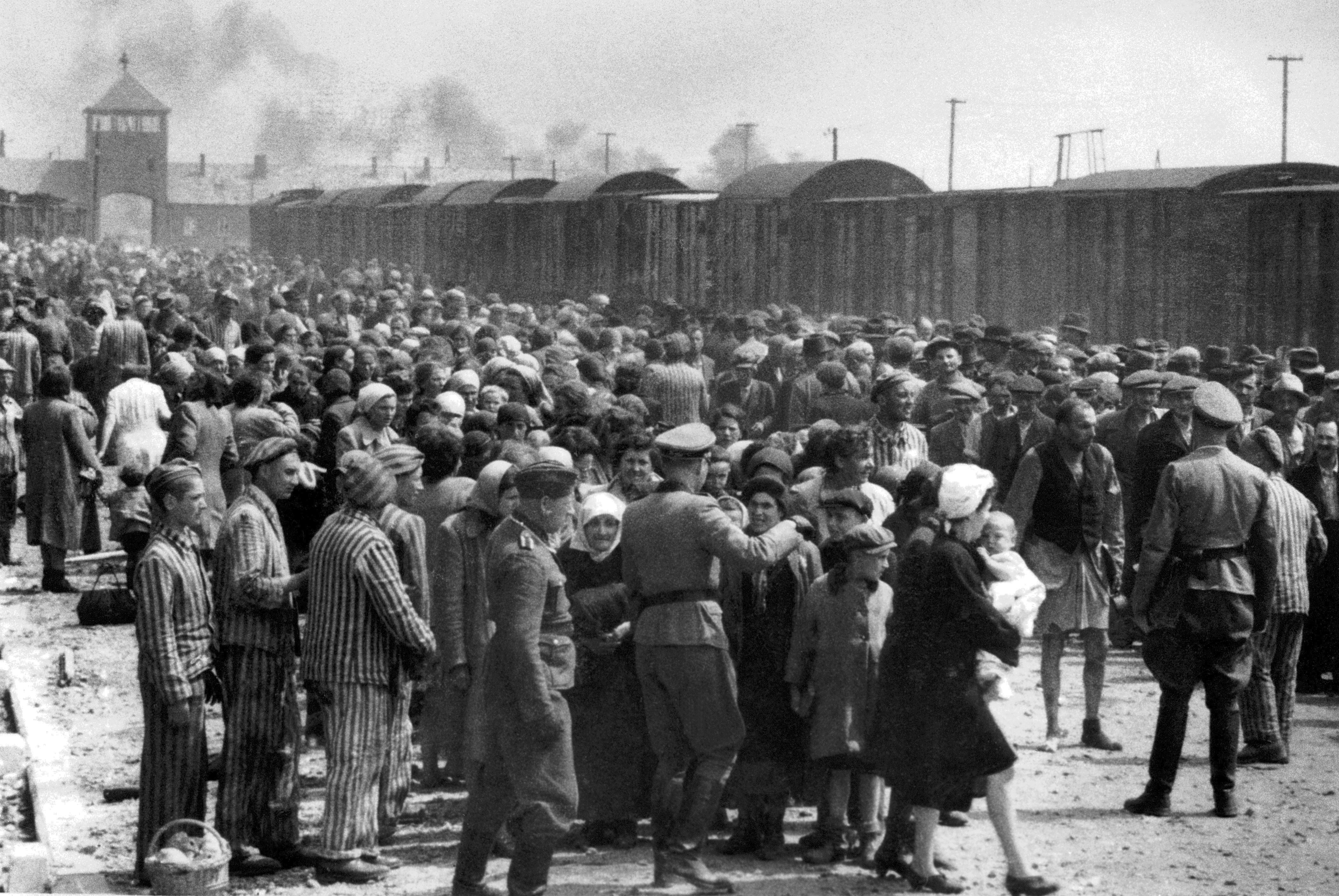
Jews arriving at Auschwitz from Hungary

The mass transports, the first organized by the Reichssicherheitshauptamt (Reich Security Head Office or RSHA), began leaving Hungary for Poland on 14 May 1944. The Hungarian government was in charge of them up to the northern border. The commander of the Kassa railroad station kept a record of the trains. The first freight train passed through Kassa on 14 May. On a typical day, there were three or four, each carrying 3,000–4,000 people. There were 109 trains for 33 days, until 16 June. On several days, there were six trains. From 25–29 June, there were 10, then 18 on 5–9 July. Another 10 trains were sent to Auschwitz via other routes.

The first three trains, each consisting of 40–50 cars, arrived at Auschwitz on 16 May. After unloading their belongings, the deportees were organized into rows of five, then led to the crematoria. According to Danuta Czech, it was from this night onward that smoke became visible from the crematoria chimneys. The camp resistance referred to the deportations in a report covering 5–25 May 1944:

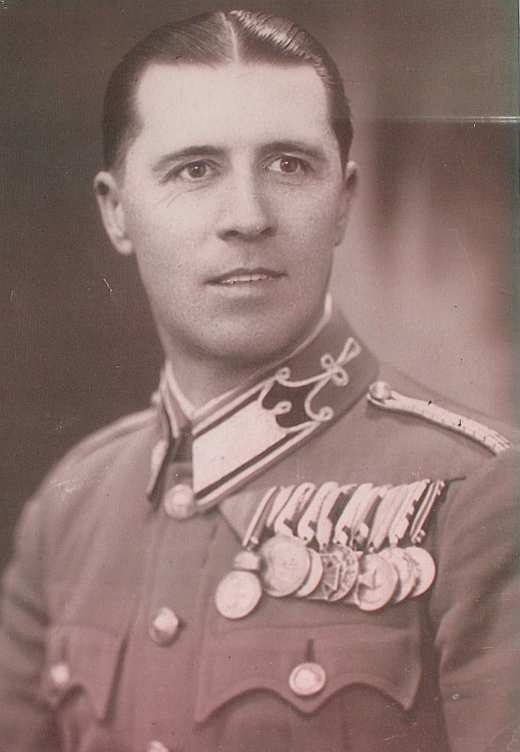
László Ferenczy, Hungarian Royal Gendarmerie

Auschwitz: Operation Höss. Since the middle of May, numerous transports of Hungarian Jews. Each night, eight trains arrive; every day five. The trains consist of 48 to 50 cars each, and in each car are 100 people. "Settlers" arrive with these transports. Each train of "settlers" also has two freight cars of lumber, which the "settlers" unload on the "death ramp", bring to another site and stack in piles ... that are intended for them. In order to simplify the work, the people arrive already separated, for example, children in separate cars. The closed trains wait for several hours on the special track to be unloaded. They stand in the nearby small forest.

From 3 June, the electric fence was kept switched on during the day, instead of only at night (as there were guards during the day), because of attempts by Hungarian Jews to escape from the crematoria. The camp resistance reported on 15 July that there had been a pause of several days in the transports after 13 June, and that between 16 May and 13 June, over 300,000 Jews from Hungary had arrived at the camp in 113 trains. According to Höss during his trial, the facilities at Auschwitz could not cope with the numbers, and he had to travel to Budapest to re-organize the transports, so that two or three trains would run on alternate days. Altogether, 111 trains were to be used. According to Höss, Heinrich Himmler, head of the SS, wanted the deportations to speed up.

By 9 July 1944, 434,351 Jews in 147 trains had been deported, according to László Ferenczy of the Hungarian Royal Gendarmerie. According to Edmund Veesenmayer, the Reich plenipotentiary in Hungary, the figure was 437,402. (Note: "By July 9, when Horthy's July order halting the deportations was finally heeded, Ferenczy could report the deportation of 434,351 Jews in 147 trains. Ferenczy's figures were slightly lower than the 437,402 reported by Veesenmayer to the German Foreign Office.") (Note: Veesenmayer's telegram to Wilhelmstrasse (German Foreign Ministry) on July 11: "The concentration and transportation of the Jews from Zone V and the Budapest suburbs was concluded with 55,741 Jews on July 9, as planned. The total result from Zones I-V and the Budapest suburbs has been 437,402.") About 80 percent of deportees were gassed on arrival. Because the crematoria were unable to cope with the number of corpses, pits were dug where bodies were burned. Photographs taken at Auschwitz (the Auschwitz Album) were found after the war showing the arrival of the Hungarian Jews at the camp.

While the majority of Hungarian Jews were sent to Auschwitz, approximately 21,000 individuals were diverted to the Strasshof concentration camp in Austria as a result of negotiations between the SS and the Aid and Rescue Committee. These prisoners were used for forced labor in agriculture and industry around Vienna, and their survival rate was significantly higher than those sent to extermination camps.

=== Selection ===
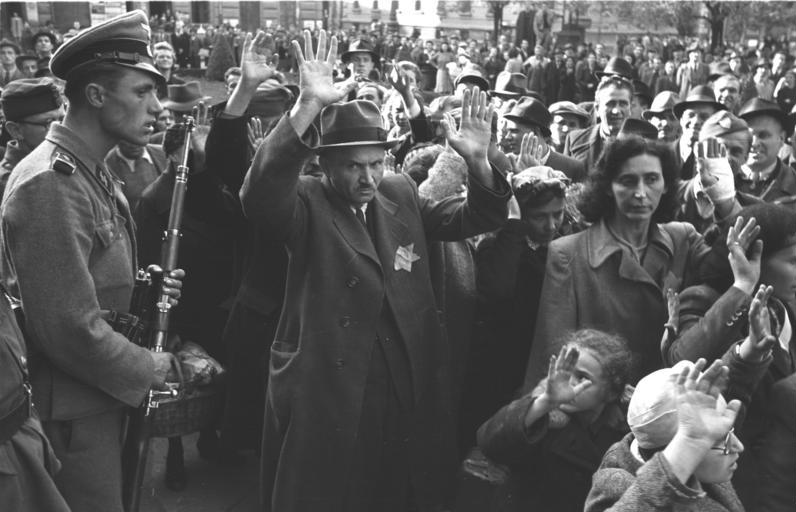
Jews in Budapest being rounded up by police in 1944

The 20 percent of new arrivals from Hungary selected as prisoners were used as slave labourers or in medical experiments. On 22 May and again on 29 May 2,000 were selected for admission. On 28 May, 963 were transferred from Auschwitz I to the Mauthausen concentration camp in Austria; and on 5 June 2,000 were sent to the Buchenwald concentration camp in Germany. The following day, Hungarian inmates with A-series serial numbers were transferred to Auschwitz III, a labour camp for IG Farben, and another 2,000 were sent to Mauthausen that day and on 13 June.

On 29 May, Miklós Nyiszli, a doctor who later worked for the camp's doctor, Josef Mengele, was admitted with his wife and daughter, although they were sent to different parts of the camp. Any twins within the transports were selected; Mengele was notorious for his medical experiments on twins. On 17 May, any boys on the Hungarian transports born as a twin were admitted as prisoners (so-called "depot prisoners") and given serial numbers A-1419–A-1437. On 18 May, 20 females who were twin sisters were selected and given serial numbers A-3622–A-3641. Twins were picked out repeatedly, including on 19, 20 and 21 May.

=== Vrba–Wetzler report ===
Just before the deportations of Jews from Budapest began, the Vrba–Wetzler report reached the Allies. The report provided a detailed description of the gas chambers, and what was happening inside the camp; it had been dictated in April 1944 to the Slovak Jewish Council by two Auschwitz escapees, Rudolf Vrba and Alfred Wetzler. Horthy's son and daughter-in-law both received copies of the report in early May, before mass deportations began. Information from the report about the murder of Czech Jews in Auschwitz was broadcast in German by the BBC World Service on its women's program at noon on 16 June 1944, with a warning that the Germans would be held responsible after the war. (Note: "News has reached London that the German authorities in Czechoslovak [sic] have ordered the massacre of 3,000 Czechoslovak Jews in gas chambers at Birkenau on or about June 20th. ... 4,000 Czechoslovak Jews who were taken from Theresienstadt to Birkenau in September 1943 were massacred in the gas chambers on March 7th. The German authorities in Czechoslovakia and their subordinates should know that full information is received in London about the massacres in Birkenau. All those responsible for such massacres from top downwards will be called to account.") It was also published by the New York Times on 20 June.

The Western Allies landed in Normandy on 6 June 1944. On 14 June, the Mayor of Budapest, Ákos Farkas, designated around 1,950 yellow-star houses to which Jews had to move to. The authorities believed that the Allies would not bomb Budapest as the houses were scattered around the city. On 15 June, American bombers dropped leaflets over Budapest threatening punishment for those involved in the deportation of Hungarian Jews. On the basis of the Vrba–Wetzler report, world leaders, including Pope Pius XII on 25 June, President Franklin D. Roosevelt, on 26 June, and King Gustaf V of Sweden on 30 June, appealed to Horthy to stop the deportations. Roosevelt threatened military retaliation, and on 7 July, Horthy ordered an end to them.

== Rescue efforts ==
=== Aid and Rescue Committee ===
==== Carl Lutz ====
Carl Lutz was a Swiss diplomat. He served as the Swiss Vice-Consul in Budapest, Hungary, from 1942 until the end of World War II. He is credited with saving tens of thousands of Jews during the Second World War, marking the largest diplomatic rescue mission of the Holocaust.

Due to his actions, half of the Jewish population of Budapest survived and was not deported to Nazi extermination camps during the Holocaust. He was awarded the title of Righteous Among the Nations by Yad Vashem.

==== Joel Brand ====
Joel Brand, a leading member of the Budapest Aid and Rescue Committee, became known for his efforts to negotiate with Eichmann to stop the deportations. In a meeting with Brand in Budapest on 25 April 1944, Eichmann offered to exchange one million Jews for 10,000 trucks from the Allies, to be used exclusively on the Eastern Front. Eichmann called the proposal "blood for goods". Using German travel documents, Brand travelled to Turkey to transmit the offer to the Jewish Agency, but the British government put an end to the talks by arresting Brand and leaking details to the media. On 20 July The Times called the proposal by the Germans "one of the most loathsome" stories of the war and that Germany had reached a "new level of fantasy and self-deception." (Note: The Times (20 July 1944): "It has long been clear that, faced with the certainty of defeat, the German authorities would intensify all their efforts to blackmail, deceive and split the allies. In their latest effort, made known in London yesterday, they have reached a new level of fantasy and self-deception. They have put forward, or sponsored, an offer to exchange the remaining Hungarian Jews for munitions of war—which, they said, would not be used on the Western front. "The whole story is one of the most loathsome of the war. It begins with a process of deliberate extirpation and ends, to date, with attempted blackmail. ... The British Government know what value to set on any German or German-sponsored offer ... they know, as well as the Germans, what happens when one begins paying blackmail. The blackmailer increases his price. Such considerations provided their own answer to the proposed bargain.")

==== Rudolf Kastner ====
Another member of the Aid and Rescue Committee, Rudolf Kastner, was involved with Brand in negotiating the "blood for goods" deal with Eichmann and a separate — successful — deal with SS officer Kurt Becher to allow 1,685 Jews to leave Hungary for Switzerland, in exchange for money and other goods. This became known as the "Kastner train". After the war, Kastner testified in favour of Becher and other Nazis at the Nuremberg tribunal.

Kastner later emigrated to Israel, where he became involved with Mapai and worked as a press officer for the Ministry of Commerce and Industry. In 1954, he became the subject of a libel case brought by the Israeli government on his behalf against Malchiel Gruenwald, who alleged that Kastner had collaborated with the Nazis. It was the first big Holocaust trial in Israel. Gruenwald had alleged in a self-published pamphlet that Kastner had known Jews were being gassed at Auschwitz as early as April 1944, after being given a copy of the Vrba–Wetzler report, but he had done nothing to warn the wider Jewish community in Hungary. Through his inaction, Gruenwald alleged, Kastner had helped the SS avoid the spread of panic, which would have slowed down the transports.

In June 1955, the judge, Benjamin Halevi, decided in Gruenwald's favor, ruling that Kastner had "sold his soul to the devil". Kastner and his associates had helped to persuade the Jewish community that they were being resettled, Halevi wrote in his 300-page judgement. In return, the SS had allowed the Kastner train to leave Hungary. Israeli historian Tom Segev called the ruling "one of the most heartless in the history of Israel, perhaps the most heartless ever". As a result of the verdict and its refusal to prosecute Kastner for collaboration, the Israeli government lost a vote of no confidence and collapsed.

Kastner was assassinated in Tel Aviv in March 1957. Most of the decision was reversed by the Israeli Supreme Court in January 1958. The majority opinion, written by Shimon Agranat, rejected the allegation of collaboration. A dissenting opinion agreed with the original judgement that the ease with which the Nazis had murdered the Jews was "the direct result of the concealment of the horrifying truth from the victims".

=== Raoul Wallenberg ===
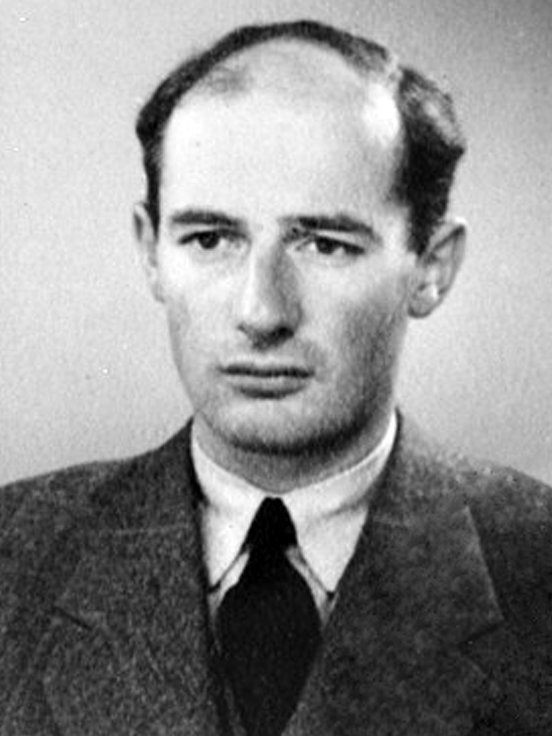
Raoul Wallenberg

With the assistance of Acting Interior Minister Béla Horváth, who provided the use of his ministry's printing press, Swedish diplomat Raoul Wallenberg and his staff prepared Protective Passports under the authority of the Swedish Legation, thus saving thousands of Jews in Hungary between July and December 1944. At one point, Wallenberg appeared personally at the railway station in Budapest, insisting that Jews on the train be removed and presenting the Arrow Cross guards with Protective Passports (Schutzpass) for many of them. Budapest named Wallenberg as an honorary citizen in 2003; several sites honour him, including Raoul Wallenberg Memorial Park and the building that housed the Swedish Embassy in 1945. Yad Vashem recognized him as Righteous Among the Nations in November 1963.

== Arrow Cross rule ==
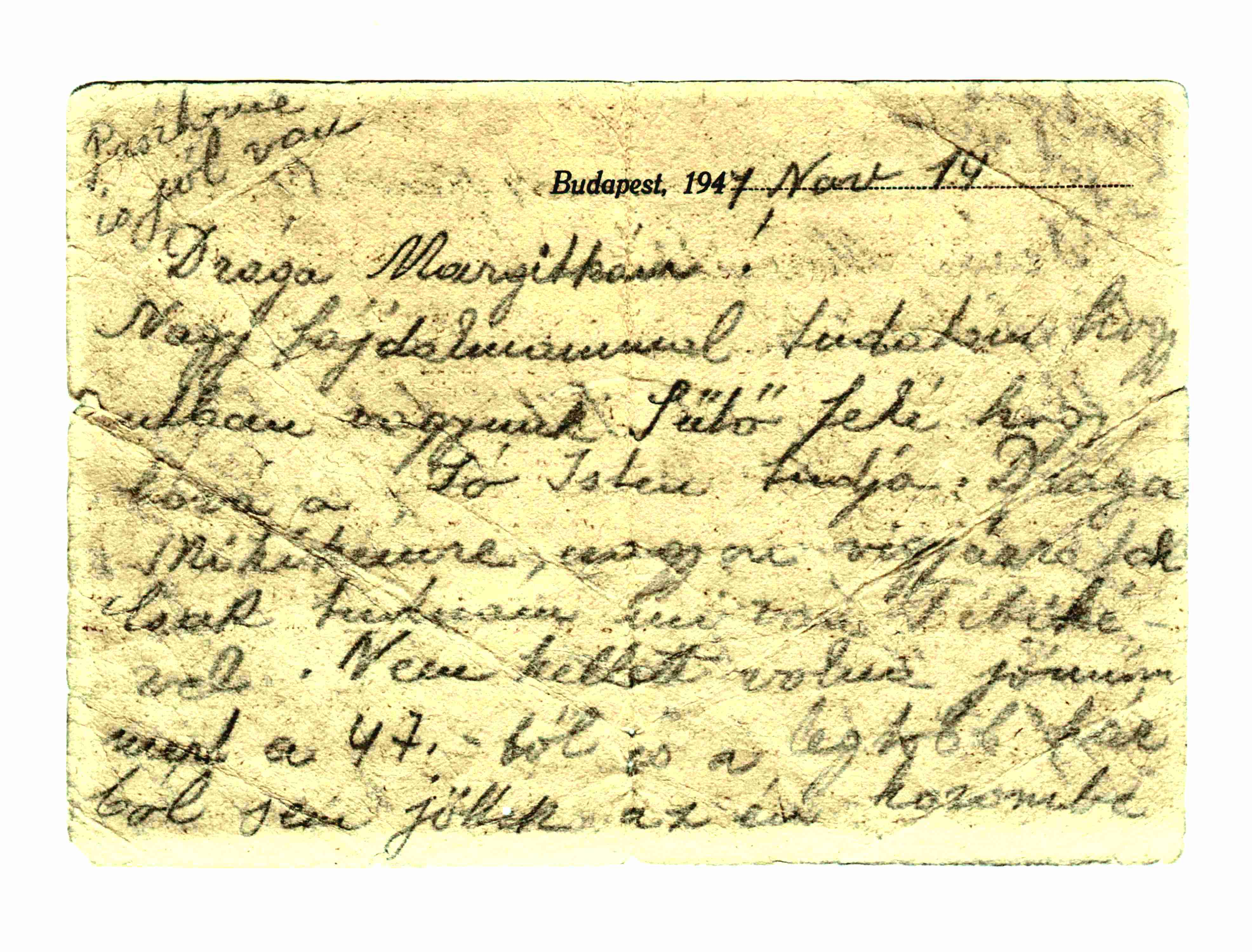
Postcard written by Sidonia Jonas (born Herzl) from Budapest on November 14, 1944. The postcard was thrown along the way, found by a passerby and mailed to her family. Documented in the book "SIDONIA" by her son, Malkiel Jonas.

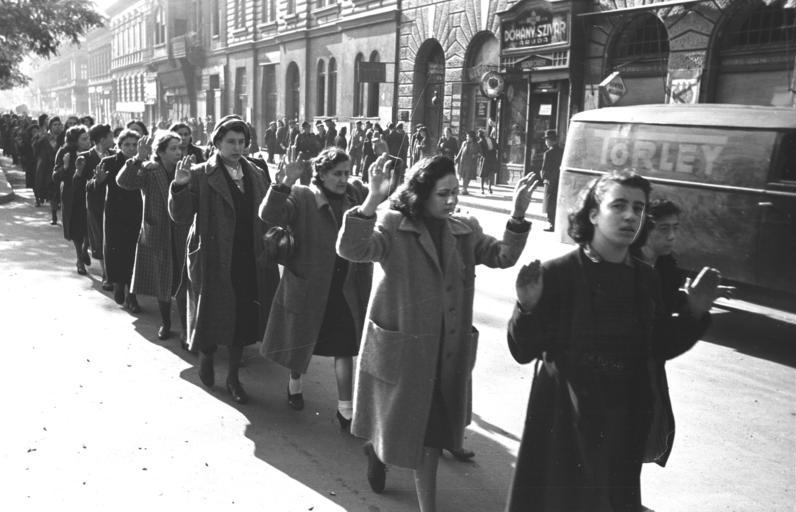
Captured Jewish women in Wesselényi Street, Budapest, 20–22 October 1944

Horthy dismissed Prime Minister Sztójay on 29 August 1944, the same day the Slovak National Uprising against the Nazis began. After Prime Minister Ferenc Szálasi came to power in October, tens of thousands of Jews in Budapest were sent on foot to the Austrian border in death marches. Most forced laborers under Hungarian Army command were deported (for instance to the Bergen-Belsen concentration camp in Germany).

Two ghettos were set up in Budapest. The small "international ghetto" consisted of several "starred" houses under the protection of neutral powers in the Újlipótváros district. Switzerland was allowed to issue 7,800 Schutzpasses (safe passage documents), Sweden 4,500, and the Vatican, Portugal and Spain 3,300 combined. The big Budapest ghetto walled in the Erzsébetváros part of Budapest on 29 November. Nyilas (Arrow Cross guards) raids and mass executions occurred in both ghettos regularly. In addition, between November 1944 and February 1945, the Nyilas shot 10,000–15,000 Jews on the banks of the Danube. Soviet troops liberated the big Budapest ghetto on 18 January 1945. On the Buda side of the town, the encircled Nyilas continued their murders until the Soviets took Buda on 13 February.

== Hungarian gold train ==
The Hungarian gold train was a Nazi-operated train that carried stolen goods, mostly the property of Hungarian Jews, from Hungary to Berlin, Germany, in 1945. After seizure of the train by the Seventh United States Army, almost none of the valuables were returned to Hungary or their rightful owners or surviving family members.

== Number of survivors ==
According to Randolph Braham around 119,000 Jews were liberated in Budapest (25,000 in the small "international" ghetto, 69,000 in the big ghetto, and 25,000 hiding with false papers), as were 20,000 camp survivors and 5,000 forced labourers. Randolph Braham estimated that just over 564,000 Hungarian Jews died between 1941 and 1945. He claims from over 800,000 Jews living within Hungary's borders in 1941–1944, about 255,500 are thought to have survived.

== Holocaust commemoration ==
Holocaust memorialization and commemoration have taken place in Hungary through memorials and museums.

The House of Fates is a controversial Holocaust museum in Budapest. Construction on the $23 million museum was completed in 2015. However, the museum has not opened due to controversy surrounding its content. One CNN article described the House of Fates as "whitewashing the country's role in the Holocaust" to advance what is feared to be the right-wing government’s effort to promote a revisionist Holocaust history. In 2019, the chair of the International Holocaust Remembrance Association stated that "the IHRA Plenary agreed to appoint a group of IHRA experts to provide input or suggestions to the international advisory boards of the House of Fates museum." The museum remains unopened.

== See also ==
- Jewish councils in Hungary
- András Kun
- Holocaust Memorial Center (Budapest)
