= László Ferenczy =

Hungarian military officer (1898–1946)

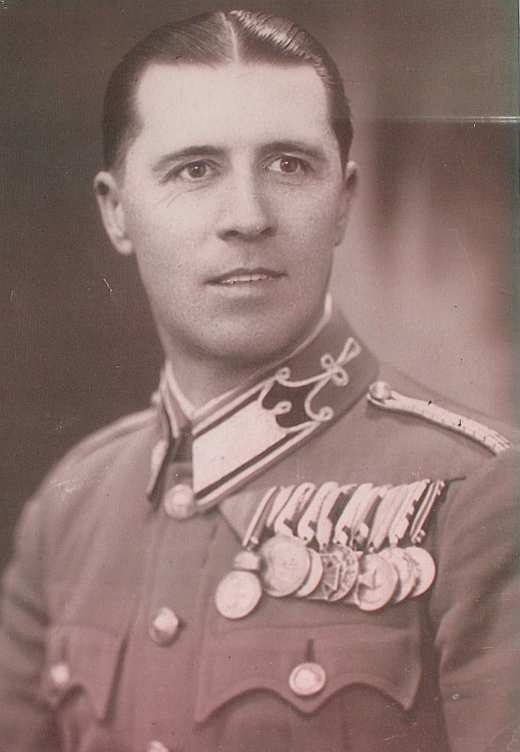
- Ferenczy in 1940
- Born: 9 March 1898; Felsővisó, Austria-Hungary
- Died: 31 May 1946 (aged 48); Budaörs, Hungary
- Political party: Hungarian Royal Gendarmerie; Arrow Cross Party
- Status: Executed by hanging
- Convictions: Treason; War crimes
- Penalty: Death

László Ferenczy (9 March 1898 – 31 May 1946) was a lieutenant colonel in the Hungarian Royal Gendarmerie and member of its "central dejewification unit" during World War II and the Holocaust.

== Background ==
Born in Felsővisó, then in the Kingdom of Hungary, Austria-Hungary, Ferenczy served from March 1940 to July 1942 with a unit that searched for Jews who had fled to Hungary from Slovakia. After Nazi Germany's invasion of Hungary in March 1944, he was appointed—on 25 March—as liaison between the Hungarian Royal Gendarmerie and the German security police, which meant he worked closely with SS officer Adolf Eichmann. Randolph Braham writes that Ferenczy's office was on the second floor of the Lomnic Hotel in the Svábhegy district of Budapest, near Eichmann's office in the Majestic Hotel.

During the Holocaust in Hungary in the spring and summer of 1944, Ferenczy helped to organize the deportation of over 434,000 of Hungary's Jews to the Auschwitz concentration camp in occupied Poland, where most were gassed on arrival. When Miklós Horthy, the Hungarian regent, ordered an end to the deportations in July, Ferenczy appeared to switch sides and in August made contact with the Budapest Aid and Rescue Committee, which was trying to make deals with Eichmann to halt the deportations. In October, when Ferenc Szálasi, head of the pro-Nazi Arrow Cross Party, became prime minister, Ferenczy was once again placed in charge of rounding up and deporting Jews.

== Execution ==
After the war, Ferenczy stood trial during the Hungarian People's Tribunals and was hanged on 31 May 1946.
