= Holocaust Memorial Center (Budapest) =

Jewish history museum in Budapest, Hungary

- Hungarian: Holokauszt Emlékközpont
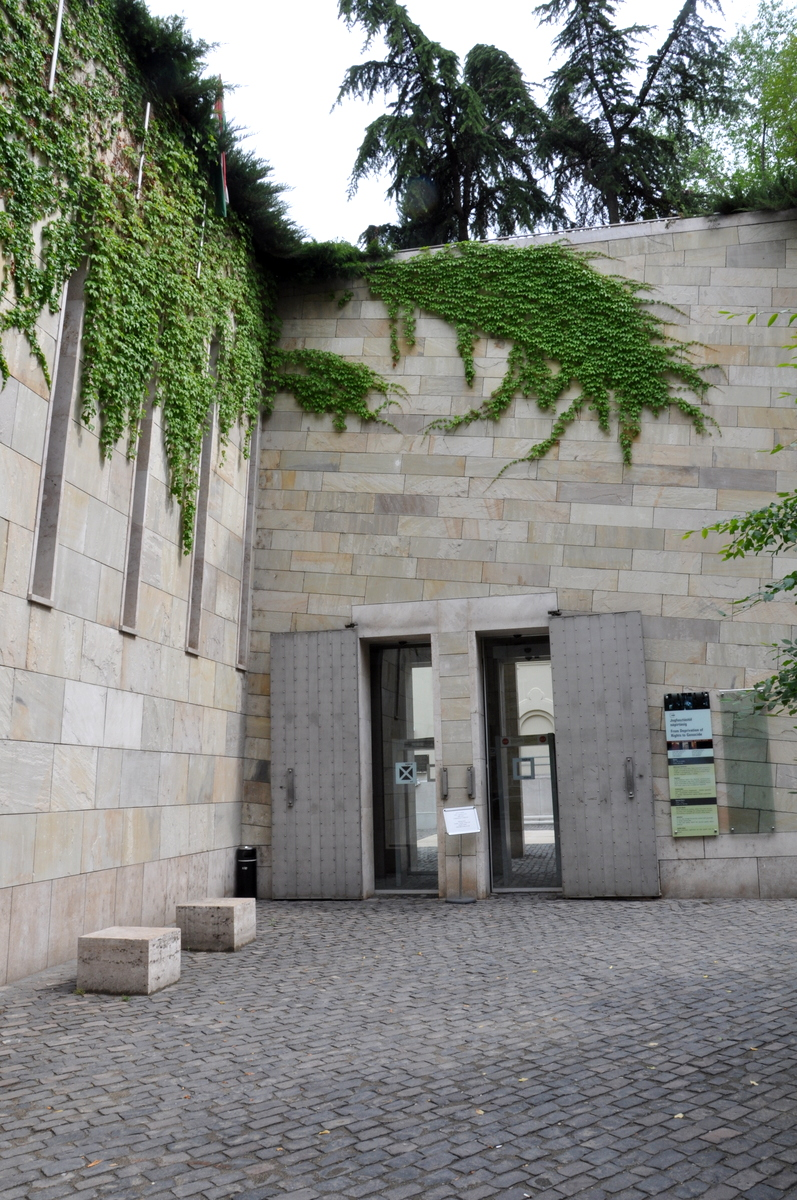
- The entrance from Páva Street

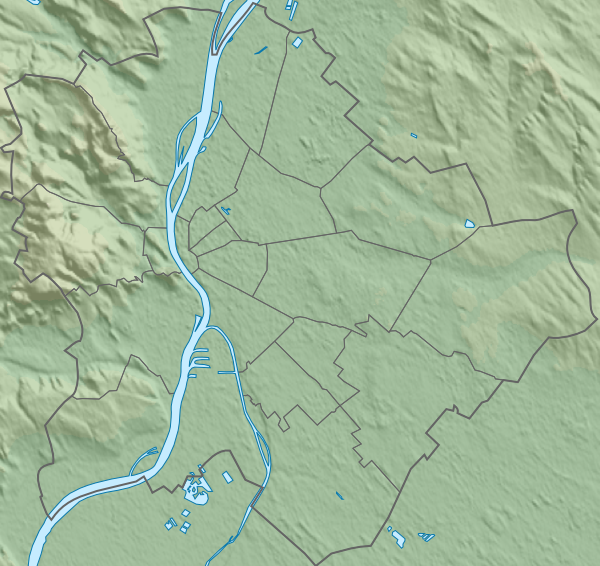
- Location of the museum in Budapest
- Established: 2004
- Location: 39 Páva Utca, Budapest, Hungary
- Coordinates: 47°29′00″N 19°04′22″E
- Type: Jewish Holocaust history museum
- Owner: Hungarian Government
- Website: hdke.hu/en

The Holocaust Memorial Center (Hungarian: Holokauszt Emlékközpont) is a Jewish Holocaust history museum, located at 39 Páva Utca, Budapest, in Hungary. Situated in the grounds of the former Páva Street Synagogue, completed in the 1920s, the museum serves as a memorial for and about Hungarian Jews who were murdered in the Holocaust. While largely focused on Jews, the museum also mentions the discrimination and killings of Romani, of homosexuals, and of the disabled.

== Overview ==
The Holocaust Memorial Center is a national institution established by the Hungarian Government in 1999. The former synagogue was renovated and opened as the memorial and museum in 2004. It is the first Holocaust Memorial Center in Central Europe founded by a state. The museum was designed by architect István Mányi and Attila Gáti. Architecturally, the building is asymmetrical. A set of stairs lead visitors to the exhibitions, meant to "symbolize the distorted and twisted time of The Holocaust." There are permanent and temporary exhibits, and a research center. The research center offers people to search for their family member and have the opportunity to add to the list of names in the museum's database.

A wall in the courtyard of the Holocaust Memorial Center is inscribed with the names of 60,000 of Hungary's approximately 600,000 victims of the genocide.

== Controversy ==
Following the victory of Viktor Orbán's Fidesz Party in the 2010 Hungarian parliamentary election, Andras Levente Gal was appointed to head the center. Paul A. Shapiro of the United States Holocaust Memorial Museum stated that Gal set out to eliminate any reference to Miklos Horthy, the Hungarian head of state who allied Hungary with Nazi Germany. Gal was accused of denying the involvement of the Hungarian state in the Holocaust, placing all the blame for the destruction of Hungarian Jewry on Germany. Many Hungarian Jews and Yad Vashem shared this concern. This led to an international outcry, following which Gal was fired from his position.

== See also ==
- History of the Jews in Hungary
- Museums in Hungary
- The Holocaust in Hungary
