= Páva Street Synagogue, Budapest =

Former synagogue, now museum, in Budapest, Hungary

Páva Street Synagogue
- Hungarian: Páva utcai zsinagóga
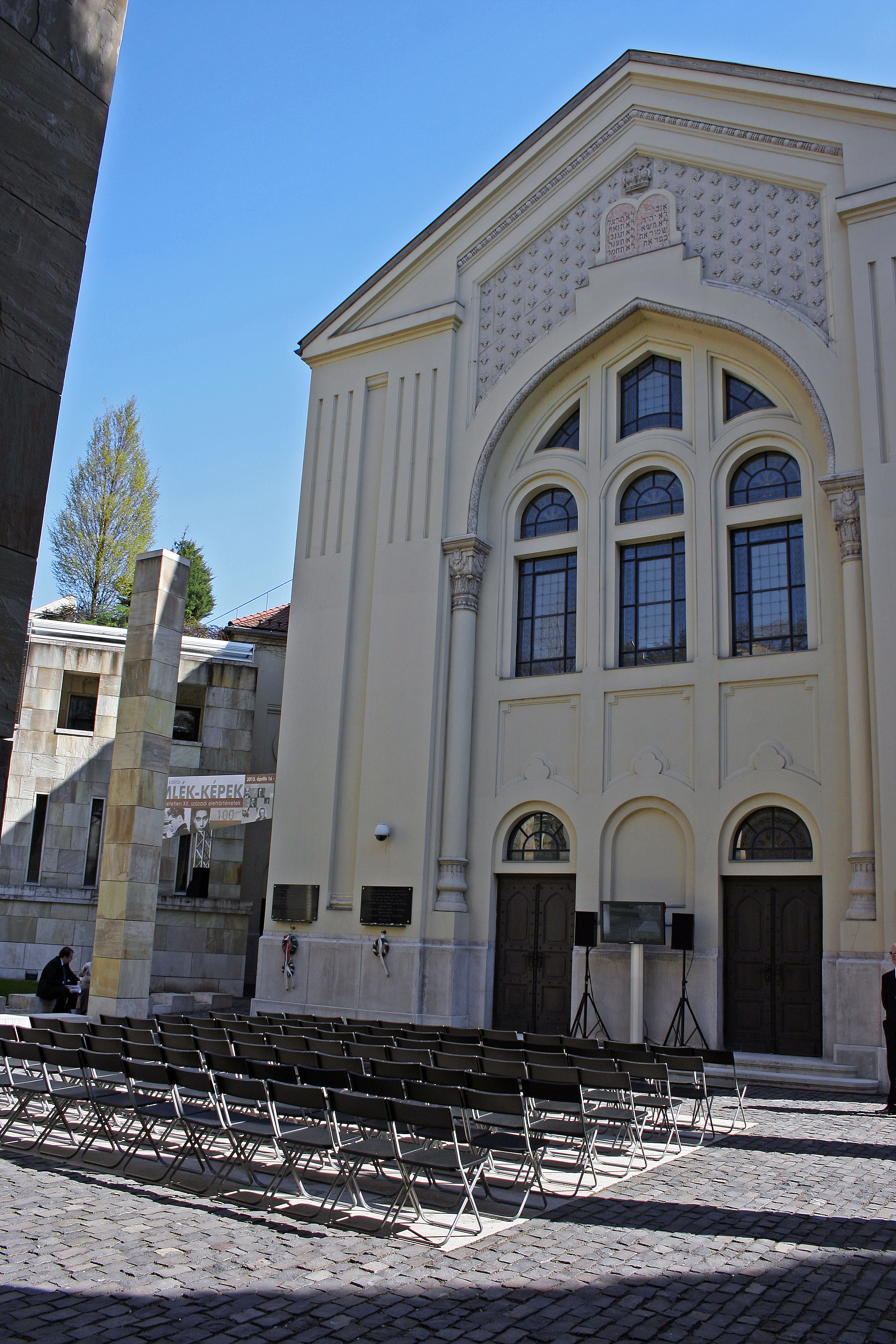
- The former synagogue, now museum, in 2013

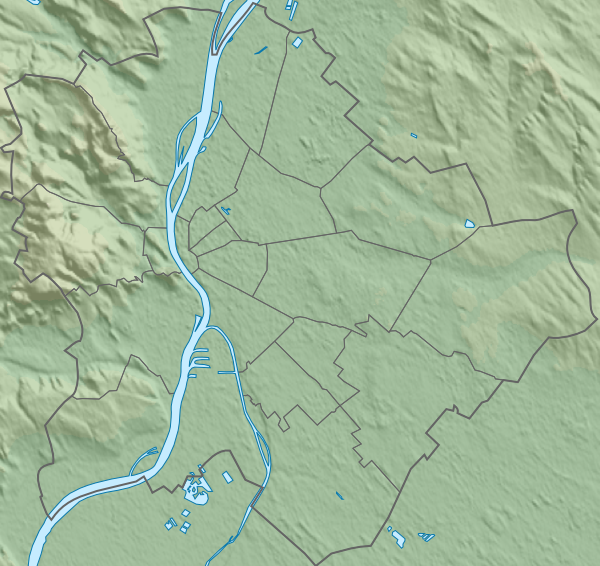
- Location of the former synagogue, now museum, in Budapest

Religion
- Affiliation: Neolog Judaism (former)
- Ecclesiastical or organizational status: Synagogue (1924–c. 1939); Jewish museum (since 2004)
- Status: Inactive (as a synagogue); Repurposed

Location
- Location: 39 Páva Street, Budapest
- Country: Hungary
- Interactive map of Páva Street Synagogue
- Coordinates: 47°29′00″N 19°04′25″E

Architecture
- Architect: Lipót Baumhorn
- Type: Synagogue architecture
- Style: Eclecticism
- Completed: 1924
- Capacity: 1,700 worshippers

The Páva Street Synagogue (Hungarian: Páva utcai zsinagóga) is a former Neolog Jewish congregation and synagogue, located at Páva u. 39 in Budapest, Hungary. Completed in 1924, the building was used a synagogue until World War II. The building was extensively renovated from 1999 and was repurposed to house the Holocaust Memorial Center since 2004.

== History ==
In the 1910s, the Jews of Józsefváros in Budapest set out to build a new, large-sized synagogue. A plot on the corner of Páva Street and Tűzoltó Street (Budapest, Páva u. 39, 1094), offered by the Belatini Braun Géza factory, was designed by Miklós Román, designer of the Aszód synagogue, but due to World War I, the plans were not realized.

In 1923 the issue was again on the agenda and Lipót Baumhorn made a new plan and the synagogue was completed by January 1924, built in an eclectic style.

Built to accommodate 1,700 people, it was handled by the Pest Jewish community. On April 17, 1926, the Equality Magazine presented the interior of the new synagogue to a wider audience: “In addition to the rich and yet decent gold plating, the three traditional Jewish colors are rich in architectonic painting: blue, white, yellow. The style of painting is considered novel: curtain drapes, often used in medieval painting, have a beautiful effect on the apse of the sanctuary with the motifs on the walls; on the parapet of the female gallery, the outlined fields are scattered with maccabe lilies, and the blue pillar flanking the shrine apse represents two columns of the Solomon's Temple, traditionally Hebrew. In the great temple arc, the enormous slogan of Jewish ethics shines: "Love your neighbor as yourself" in Hebrew and Hungarian. All the motifs of the painting were designed and drawn by the architect Lipót Baumhorn in the smallest detail.”

In the 1980s, the building housed the office and culture room of the local Israeli religious district, while the winter prayer hall served religious functions. The modern building of the Holocaust Documentation Center and Memorial has been set up in its immediate surroundings and has operated since 2004.

== Gallery ==
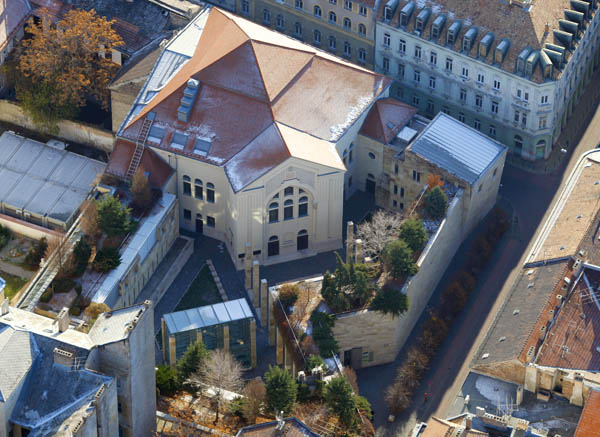

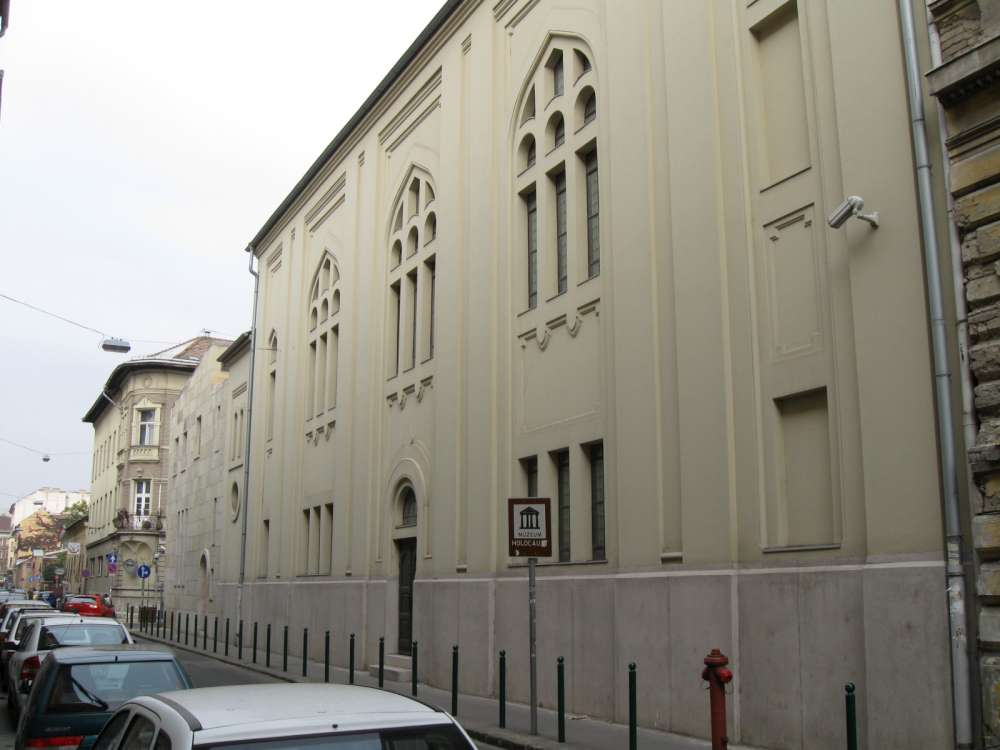

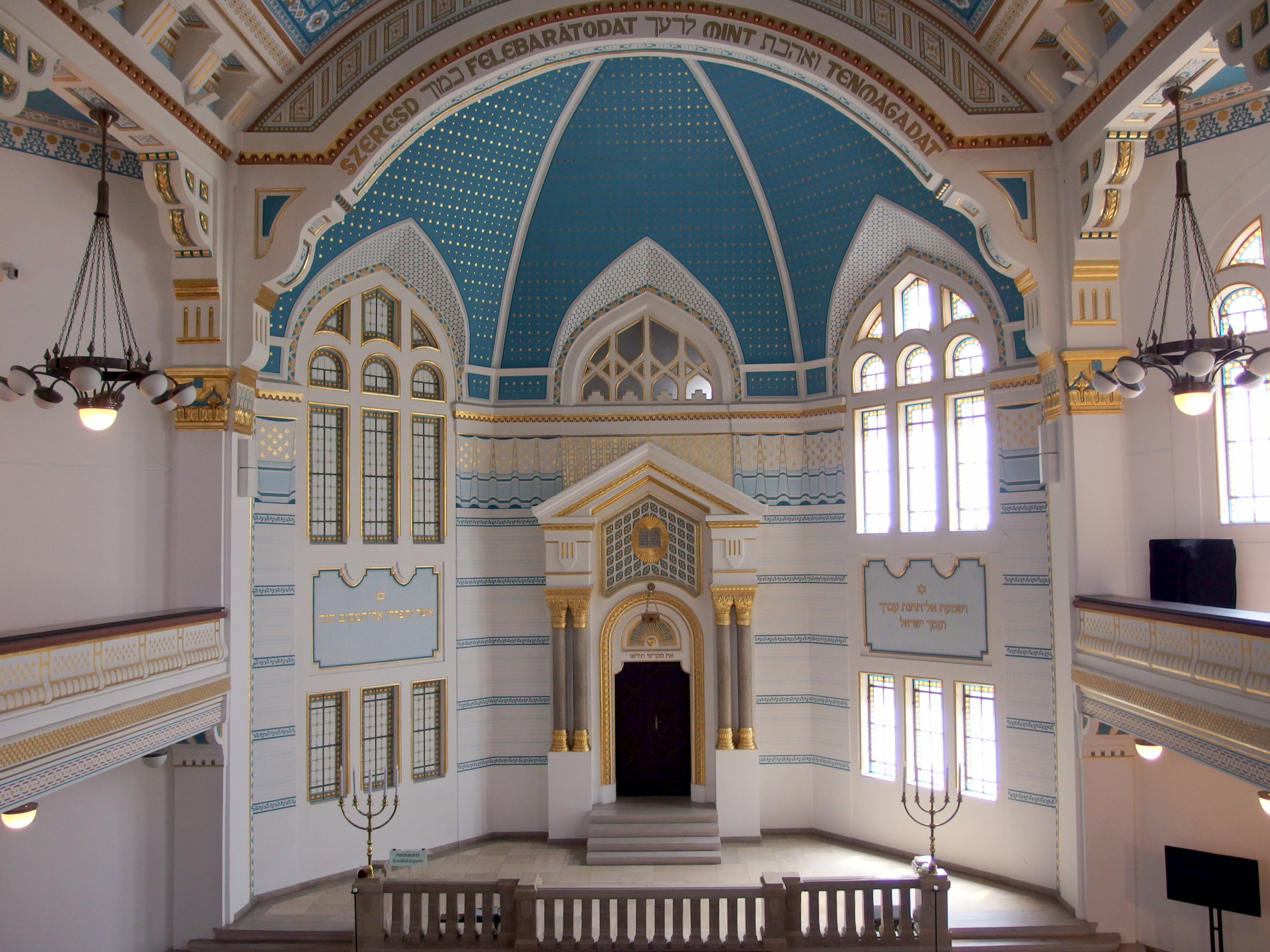

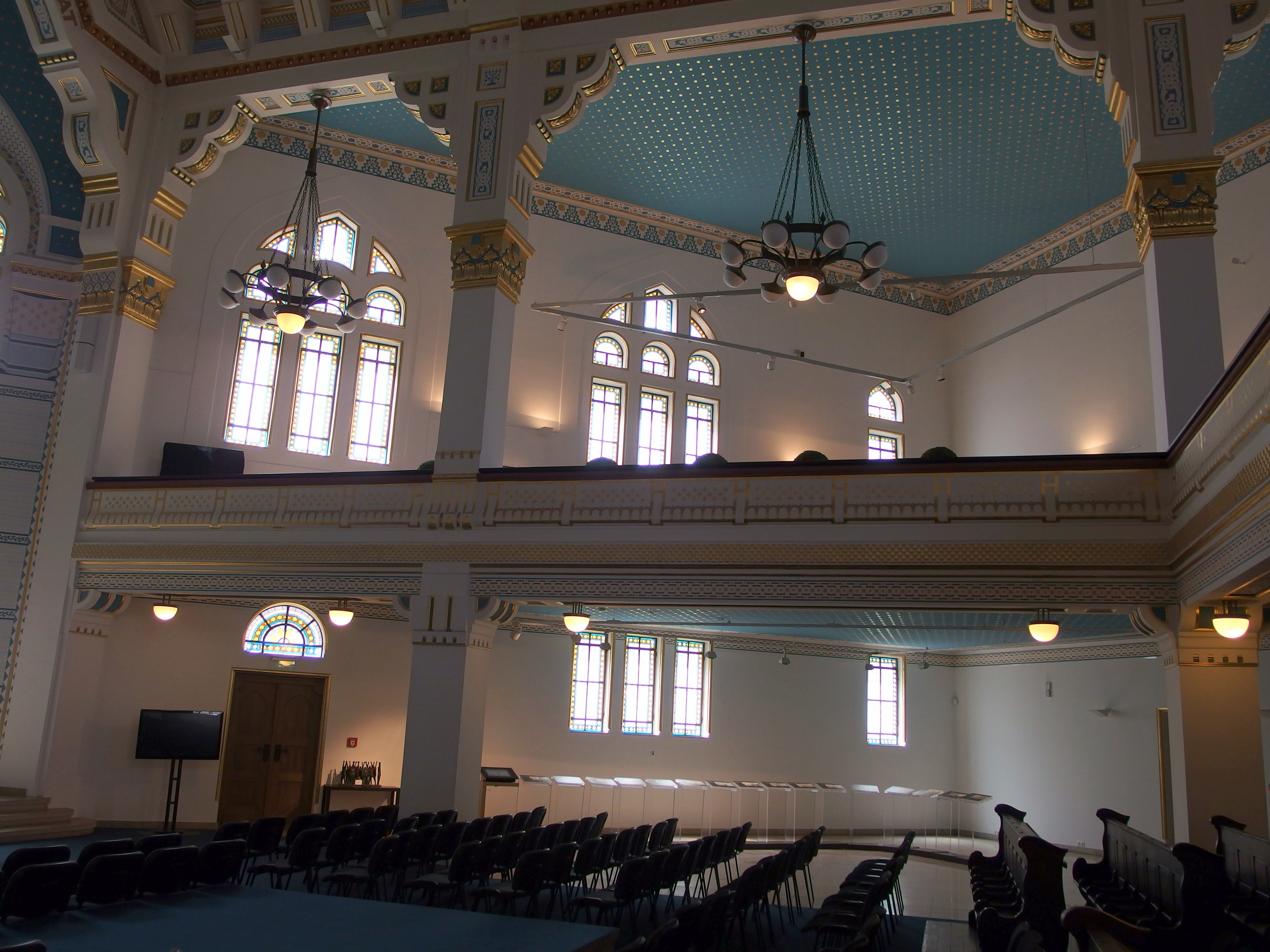

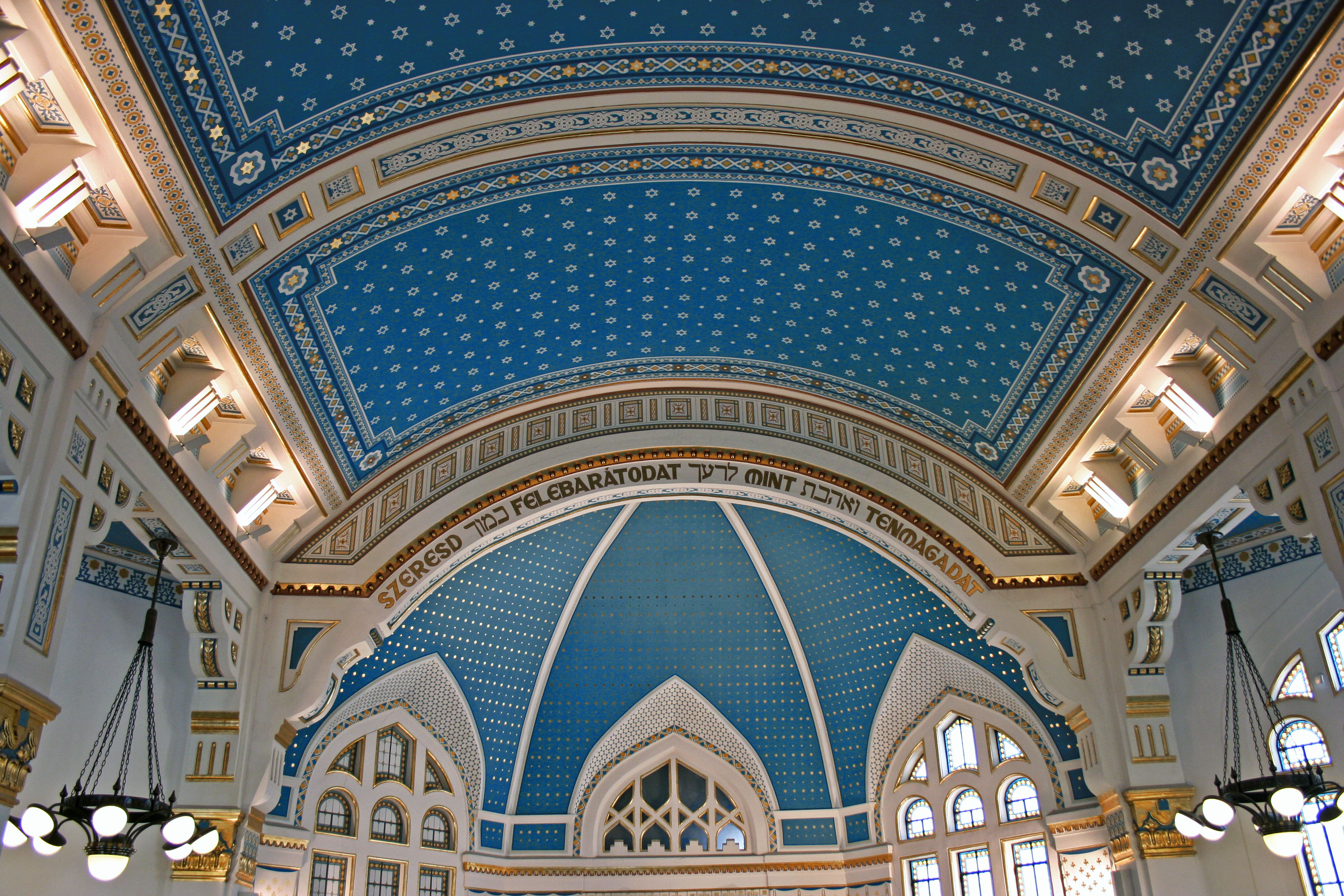

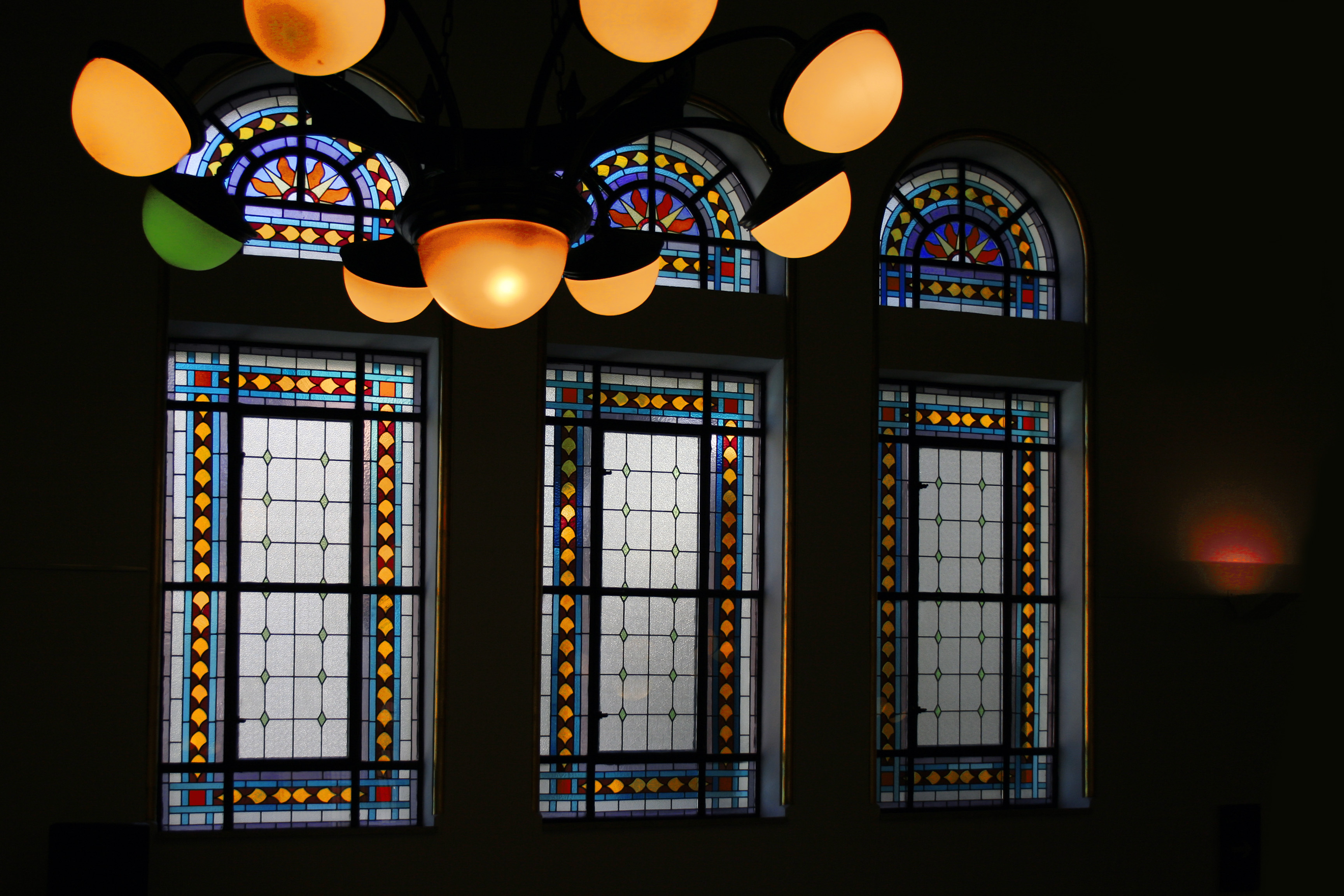

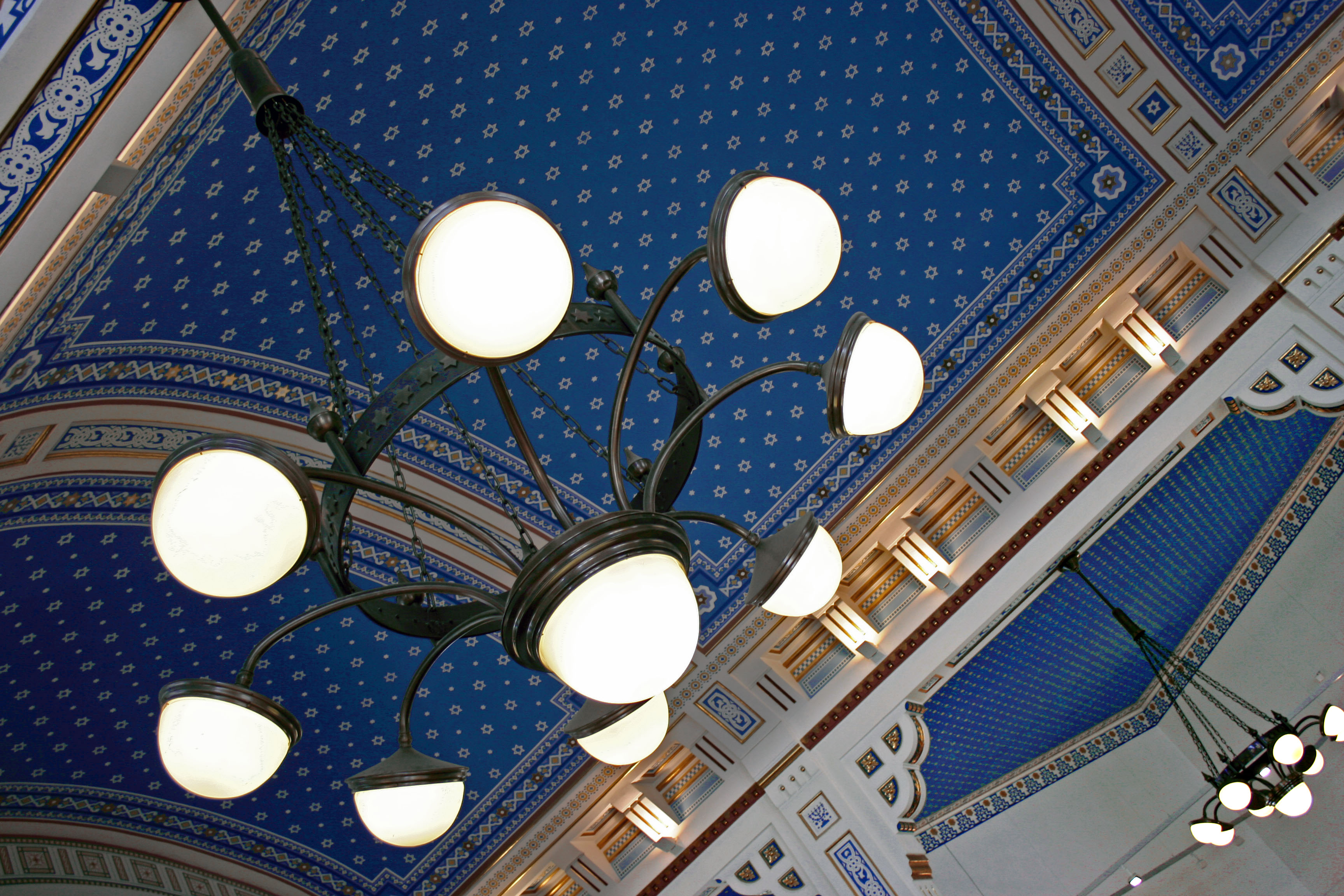

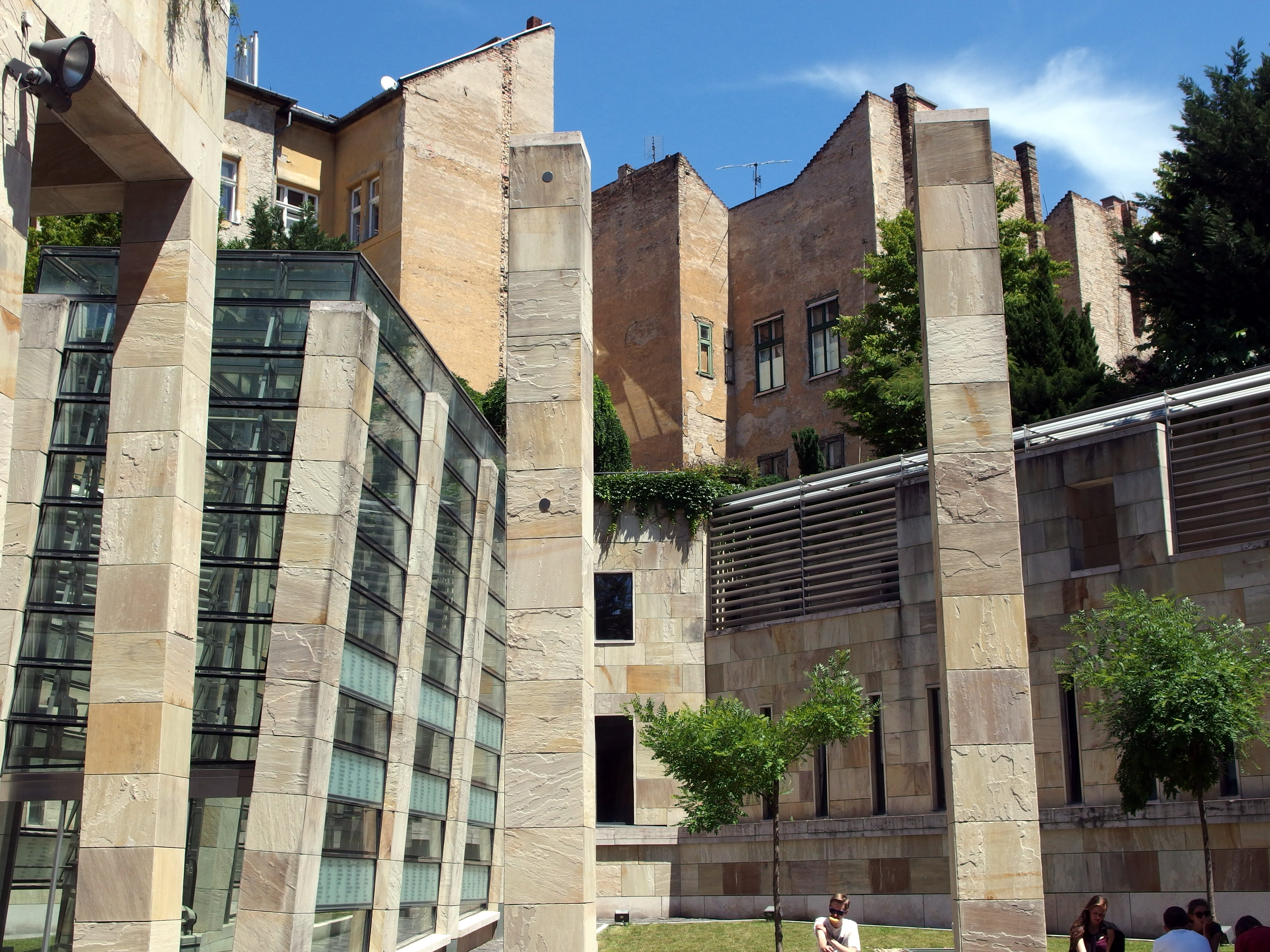
A different style memorial place in the courtyard of the synagogue
