= Hungarian Royal Gendarme Veterans' Association =

International veterans' organization

The Hungarian Royal Gendarme Veterans' Association (Hungarian: Magyar Királyi Csendőr Bajtársi Közösség), commonly known by its initialism of MKCsBK or Csendor, is an international veterans' organization founded in its initial form in 1947, with the goal of maintaining an association of veterans of the Royal Hungarian Gendarmerie following its dissolution in 1944 during the Soviet occupation of Hungary. It continues today as an association of the few remaining living veterans, with an additional goal of making original information and records about the Hungarian Royal Gendarmes available to the public to counter what the MKCsBK deems to be misinformation disseminated by the government during the years of communist rule.

== The roots of the MKCsBK: The Hungarian Royal Gendarmerie ==
The Hungarian parliament created the Hungarian Royal Gendarmerie with a law sanctioned on February 14, 1881. It was modelled after the French Gendarmerie, and this day became the official "Gendarme day" in 1936. The gendarmerie was a militarily organized corps entrusted with the public safety in the rural parts of Hungary, but in July 1914, the gendarmes started overseeing also over urban areas. The gendarmes were subordinate to the Hungarian Internal Affairs and Defence ministries. Until 1914, the gendarmerie grew from year to year. In 1886 there were 5,500 csendőrs (gendarmes), in 1901 – 8,000, and almost 12,000 by the start of the Great War. This growth was continuous, but there were substantial jumps in 1894 and 1897 (periods of agrarian unrest), and again in 1905–06 and 1911, in a context of high tension between the opposition and the government. The government justified the increase in gendarmerie by the need to improve "public security", restrain socialist agitation, control minority nationalists and strike movements, and stem (illegal) emigration to the West. The Hungarian gendarmes received extensive criticism for its brutality against workers’, leftist and non-Magyar national movements. One estimation, calculated over 105 gendarmerie deployments during the labour mobilisations between 1891 and 1914, suggested that these operations left 61 civilians killed, 203 seriously wounded, 665 with minor injuries and 1,443 arrested, as well as 6 gendarmes killed and 35 injured. Some cases of gendarme shootings of mass protesters acquired notoriety; the shooting of 20 miners in Stájerlakanina/Anina on January 20, 1897, 20 Social-Democrat sympathisers shot in Elesd/Alesd on April 24, 1904, and the Černová massacre, which claimed the lives of 15 peasants on October 27, 1907, meaning that the ‘cruel’ Hungarian gendarmes became the targets of literary critics across Europe – from Norway (from the pen of Bjørnstjerne Bjørnson) to Romania (where Octavian Goga staged the play "Domnul notar") – which greatly contributed to the belief that the Hungarian state was oppressing national minorities. After the Great War, this belief weighed heavily during the Paris Peace Conference, where participants argued for the dismemberment of historical Hungary, which was ultimately sanctioned by the Trianon Treaty of 1920.

With a regional-divisional-chapter-garrison structure it had a relatively short chain of command. The essence of the gendarmerie was the garrisons of five to fifteen gendarmes scattered throughout the countryside, and therefore they performed their duties quite independently, albeit according to strictly detailed regulations, issued by a special division under the authority of the Department of Interior. At the same time, the members of the gendarmerie personally were under the jurisdiction of the Department of Defense. The guarding of public safety and peace in the villages, as well as crime prevention and criminal investigations were exclusively the job of the enlisted gendarmes, while the officers were responsible for training, supervision, and communication with other authorities.

Every gendarme owned and was very familiar with the so-called Service Regulations book (Szut.), which codified the laws and regulations affecting their service. Both enlisted men, and officers alike were expected to continually further their knowledge and improve themselves, not only regarding their vocation, but in a broad range of topics. They actively participated in various sports (to the degree that several members were on the national Olympic team), maintained a small library collection at each garrison (which was also available for use to the local villagers), and made reading and studying a regular part of their daily routine. They also placed an emphasis on character training to become reliable, fair, moral, incorruptible, impartial and unbiased, in addition to being able to make fast, wise and firm decisions. There was a great emphasis on the respect of authority and the love of their country, their countrymen, and their corps. They were expected to live their lives in every respect according to the gendarme oath, the "Gendarme Ten Commandments," and their motto of "Faithfully, Honourably, Valiantly," ("Híven, becsülettel, vitézül"). The demands of being a gendarme transcended occupation to become a way of life.

The Hungarian Royal Gendarmerie achieved international recognition for its exceptional effectiveness in crime prevention and investigation, solving over 90% of petty thefts and small crimes and nearly 100% of major crimes. This played a role in allowing Hungary under the Dual Monarchy to achieve a previously unprecedented national development, lifting the previously somewhat feudal Hungary to a European level. Police and gendarmes from several other countries visited to learn from them and borrow their techniques and procedures.

The effectiveness of the Gendarmerie could be attributed to several reasons. In addition to the excellent organization of the corps and the requirement for continuous training and self-education of all its members, the gendarmes were selected from the villages so they were quite familiar with the ways of the people and already had their trust and respect. The excellence of their work is even more remarkable considering that most gendarmes were selected from the poor families of the villages, who had good character but only a few years of elementary education. Their daily training in the garrisons included not only job-related knowledge, but general subjects as well as, to make them well-rounded people.

Although the gendarmes had a constant responsibility to guard the safety and peace of the countryside, they could also be called upon for various specific tasks at the request of other legal authorities. The service-requesting authority was responsible for the content of the request, while the gendarmes’ responsibility was to carry it out precisely according to the set laws and regulations. A gendarme had no right to critique his orders.

During the 64 years of existence of the Hungarian Royal Gendarmerie, several governments were in power. The gendarmes fulfilled their vocation to guard the public safety under each government, whether it was the Austro-Hungarian Monarchy, the short-lived Hungarian Soviet Republic, the Horthy era, or the German occupation.

Partly as a result of their faithful work to protect all lawful Hungarian citizens regardless of their ethnicity or religion, Hungary was the safest place for Mid-European Jews until Hungary's German occupation in March 1944. As local and state agencies were also authorized to use the services of the gendarmes, they took part in the deportation and the confiscation of Jewish properties, including valuables.

In the prisoner of war camps of the West, the Allies used the gendarmes as guards, even going so far as to return their weapons, for they were well known for their reliable, fair, and experienced service. At the end of the war, the Americans sent the Hungarian prisoners-of-war back to Hungary, including the gendarmes, where brutal persecution awaited them. Therefore, many escaped from the American camps into the British or French displaced persons’ camps, and eventually found a new life in various countries scattered over all the continents. They have earned the respect of the communities wherever they went, as they were used to serving faithfully, working honestly, improving themselves constantly, propagating the common good, and thinking resourcefully. They even contributed to the furthering of law enforcement in the recipient countries.

Along with the Soviet occupation of Hungary, the communist party arrived from Moscow with a set plan to seize political power. They aimed to abolish the previous regime, so they had to eradicate first of all its most loyal and powerful support, the Hungarian Royal Gendarmerie. Therefore, in December 1944, among its first acts, the Temporary National Cabinet issued a ruling to abolish the Hungarian Royal Gendarmerie, claiming it collectively guilty of “brutal acts against the proletariat and peasantry” of Hungary in the previous decades. On its own, this political reason for the disbandment and ruthless persecution of a lawfully established corps would not have been acceptable in the eyes of the Allies, so the communists found a better excuse in the Gendarmerie's involvement in the deportation of the Jews. In order to sell this accusation, however, they had to overemphasize some aspects of it, suppress others, and add overt lies. They also destroyed all the documents relating to the Hungarian Royal Gendarmerie, so there would be no way to check on the truthfulness (or falsehood) of their claims. As a result of 65 years of their systematic propaganda both toward the West and in the education of new generations in Hungary, the gendarmes are now commonly blamed not only for the deportation of the Jews, but for the very Holocaust itself, even though Hungary had no concentration camps and it is a matter of public record that the gendarmes could have had no knowledge of the existence of the death camps at the time, as the Jewish Council of Budapest only informed Admiral Horthy of their existence in the second part of June 1944, by which time most of the deportations had already taken place (with the exception of the Jews of Budapest, who were saved by Horthy with the support of the gendarmes). Even though in the cities mainly the police and other authorities were involved, the Gendarmerie's participation has been exaggerated and became the only factor considered in their evaluation, ignoring their internationally acclaimed excellence in crime control of the previous six decades.

The collective persecution of the gendarmerie had severe consequences for its members. Thousands of them were killed, tortured, beaten to death, imprisoned, sent to work camps famous for brutal treatments and at best, became marginalized in society, not finding work, nor receiving any state benefits (health care, retirement benefits, etc.). Even their children were barred from higher education. The few cases of claimed mistreatment of the Jews at the hands of the gendarmes cannot be compared to the brutality with which the ÁVO treated the gendarmes; and the AVO did that not only by occasional misuse of power, but in every case and by order. Persecution was the fate of all gendarmes, including those who had already retired before the war began and those who were at the front lines, never having anything to do with the deportations, and even those who themselves were known to have helped the Jews. Only a very few gendarmes were able to continue to serve under the communist government, but eventually they, too, were executed. After the 1989 fall of communism, the Constitutional Court judged the collective verdict against the Gendarmerie unconstitutional, and against modern law to persecute any person who himself did not participate in any criminal acts. The Court also found the verdict of 1945 unconstitutional because it dissolved an organization which was not created for the purpose of causing harm to others (like the SS was, for example), but rather to protect and aid the safety of others, a task which they indeed carried out with distinction for over six decades.

According to the 1944 Gendarmerie Handbook, 969 officers and 22,000 enlisted gendarmes served during World War II. Less than half survived the war: about 360 officers and 10,000 enlisted gendarmes. About 5,000 died at the hands of the communists, about 3,000 were sent to Soviet work camps, and about 1,500 ended up escaping to the West. In 1971, about 3,000 gendarmes were still living in Hungary, and around 1,100 in exile, scattered worldwide. Only a few hundred survived to see the rehabilitation of their corps. For all the gendarmes, their rehabilitation occurred half a century too late.

The Hungarian government legally rehabilitated the Hungarian Royal Gendarmerie in 1991, but the damage of the previous fifty years of propaganda against them has not been easily repaired. The Hungarian media remains strongly anti-gendarme, the written documents of the Gendarmerie are still not available, and Hungary still does not have a museum or permanent exhibit dedicated to the gendarmes despite the provision of materials by the MKCsBK in 2000. This situation has been exacerbated by the Hungarian far-right seizing on and embracing the Gendarmerie's fabricated past as perpetrators of the Holocaust.

== The formation of the MKCsBK ==
The gendarmes never accepted the illegal dissolution of the Hungarian Royal Gendarmerie, so they considered themselves gendarmes for the rest of their lives ("out-of-duty gendarmes"). Their strong sense of belonging and corporate identity remained for the rest of their lives. On June 21, 1947, Pál Jegenyés, sergeant major and former garrison commander, along with six fellow gendarmes established the Magyar Csendőr Bajtársi Asztaltársaság (Royal Hungarian Gendarmerie Veterans' Table Organization) in Graz, Austria. In 1948 they began to publish the Bajtársi Levél (Veterans' Letter), the official newsletter of the organization. In 1949, the name of the organization was changed to the Magyar Királyi Csendőr Bajtársi Közösség (Hungarian Royal Gendarme Veterans Association, or MKCsBK). They chose from among themselves one person to be the central director, who was responsible for the publication of the Bajtársi Levél, and for all activities of the organization. Lieutenant General and former Commandant Lajos Folkusházy served as central director from 1950 to 1958, and made a strong effort to contact the Hungarian gendarmes worldwide to encourage them to go on with their lives under new circumstances, but still according to their oath and motto, "Faithfully, honorably, valiantly" ("Híven, becsülettel, vitézül").

Several gendarmes, both officers and enlisted, provided the leadership of the organization over the decades, as their circumstances allowed, supporting each other in the work (therefore, there are overlaps in the years they served). The central director's home address also served as the address of the organization itself, so the MKCsBK's address has changed over the decades from country to country, even continent to continent. The central directors, in chronological order, were:

- Sergeant-Major Pál Jegenyés, 1947–48, Graz, Austria
- Col. vitéz Jenő Karsay, 1948–49, Graz, Austria
- Lt. General and former Commandant Lajos Folkusházy, 1950–58, Salzburg, Austria
- Col. vitéz Gyula Király, 1958–64, São Paulo, Brazil
- Capt. vitéz Károly Kövendy, aka. Károly Szathmáry, 1964–74, Toronto, Canada, who also established the Gendarme Guest House and Museum near Toronto. (After his death, the collection was eventually given to the War-museum in Budapest in the early 1990s)
- Col. vitéz Ferenc Vattay, 1972–74, Buenos Aires, Argentina
- Col. Aladár Pintér, 1974, Buenos Aires, Argentina
- Sergeant-Major László Enyedy, 1974–75, Toronto, Canada
- Capt. vitéz barancsi Endre Tamáska, 1974–83, FL, USA
- Sergeant-Major vitéz Lajos Keresztes, 1975–78, Calgary, Canada
- Capt. Dr. Gyula Kiss, 1978–94, Calgary, Canada
- 1st Lt. vitéz Gábor Kiss, 1995–2001, FL, USA
- 2nd Lt. vitéz Béla Viczián, 2001–2007, WI, USA
- vitéz Zoltán Kőrössy, son of Capt. Dr. vitéz Zoltán Kőrössy, 2007–present, MD, USA

== MKCsBK branches and publications ==
The membership of the MKCsBK initially comprised only gendarmes, but later they added so-called honorary gendarmes, as well as anyone who sympathized with them and supported their goals. They never had membership dues and only solicited voluntary contributions to defray with the printing costs of their publications and to help their fellow gendarmes in need. The MKCsBK is an officially registered non-profit organization in Canada and in the USA.

The MKCsBK had 48 branches in 40 countries by 1950. Their leaders kept a close contact with the central director. Gendarme Major János Borgoy started one of the largest and most active US group in 1958, in Cleveland, Ohio, under the name of Hungarian Gendarme Family Association (Magyar Csendőrök Családi Közössége). Captain István Molnár has been leading this group since 1978. They published their own local quarterly newsletter, Egyesületi értesítő until 1975.

Gendarme Captain v. barancsi Endre Tamaska published a personal gendarme newsletter in Florida between 1982 and 2004, and some of the other groups also had their own local newsletter for a period of time.

The MKCsBK also presented a radio program in February 1955, 1956, and 1957, to commemorate the Gendarme Day. Gendarme Captain Dr. v. Zoltan Korossy delivered a speech in 1956, which can be read or heard through the library of the website (http://csendor.com/konyvtar/iratok/irasok/magyar/).

The organization's main connection to its members over the years has remained its regular newsletter, the Bajtársi Levél, which was published continuously between 1948 and 2005. Its chief editors most often were the central director at the time, and therefore the address of the newsletter as well as its character changed accordingly:

- Starting on September 20, 1948, Sergeant-Major Pál Jegenyés (Graz, Ausztria), and from May 12, 1951, Col. vitéz Jenő Karsay (Bergenz, Dreibergen, majd Utrecht): 1–2 issues a month as a copied 4–10 pages letter, with a gendarme hat and a Hungarian coat-of-arms in its letterhead, which was changed starting with the August 1952 issue to the picture of the gendarme martyrs’ statue that used to stand on the yard of the Gendarme Officer Training School (Böszörményi út).
- From October 1, 1964. Capt. vitéz Károly Kövendy (Szathmáry), (Islington, Ontario, Canada, and later Etobicoke, Toronto, Canada), and from July 1, 1975. Capt. Dr. Gyula Kiss (Calgary, Alberta, Canada): between 1964 and 1981, a biannual, light-green covered, 20 to 150 page professionally printed and bound book, with the picture of the gendarme martyrs’ statue with the MKCsBK emblem at its base. The cover picture was changed to the 100th anniversary composite picture starting with the October 31, 1980, issue.
- From January 1, 1982, Capt. vitéz baranchi Endre Tamáska (Sarasota, Florida) and from June 1, 1983, 1st Lt. Sandor Domokos (Kanada): 50 to 100 letter-size pages, copied, stapled, with the same cover as before. In the August 23, 1994, supposed "last issue" they proposed either the discontinuation of the newsletter, or borrowing two pages from the newsletter of a sister organization, MHBK (World Federation of Hungarian Veterans).
- As the above plans did not come to pass, 1st Lt. vitéz Gabor Kiss published the newsletter himself, starting in March 1995, as a smaller-size, 8 to 26 page copied and stapled booklet, with various gendarme pictures on its front.
- Between 2001 and 2005, 2nd Lt. vitéz Bela Viczian sent out the newsletter with fewer and fewer pages as his health declined. The December 2005 issue (Volume 57. number2) was the final issue.
- From 2006 to 2007, a few letters kept the gendarmes in touch.
- Since January 2008, a quarterly newsletter with a new letterhead of the gendarme hat and Hungarian coat-of-arms is sent out, both in English and in Hungarian, via mail or email, according to any member's preference, and is also archived in the MKCsBK website's library.

In 1984, at the request of the Hungarian-consciousness Movement, Capt. Dr. Gyula Kiss prepared a 50-page document for a Hungarian Lexicon on the history of the Hungarian Royal Gendarmerie as well as the MKCsBK and brief biographies of many of their members. (It was published as Encyclopedia Hungarica 1994. Főszerk. Bagossy László, Magyarságtudat Alalpítvány, Friesen Nyomdavállalat, Altona, Canada.)

As a “farewell and last will,” a collection of yet-untold stories of the still-living gendarmes was also collected and published in two books, compiled by Gyula Szalay, A világjáró csendőr, and by v. Gabor Kiss, Híven, becsülettel, vitézül (also see them in the Bibliography of our website).

== The goals and achievements of the MKCsBK ==
=== 1945–1960: helping each other ===
In their early years, the MKCsBK gave substantial assistance (money and care packages) to the gendarmes and their families in Hungary, who were stripped of their pensions and livelihoods. They also provided manifold support to the gendarmes trying to establish a new existence in an unfamiliar country, needing to learn a new trade, a new language and new customs, while being severed from all their roots. The generous donations of the members as well as fund-raising ceremonies and events provided the financial support for these activities.

=== 1960–1989: remembering and collecting memorabilia ===
Capt. vitéz Károly Kövendy (Szathmáry), the central director between 1964 and 1974, asked the gendarmes to donate any gendarme memorabilia they might have had in order to establish a museum. Soon, a large number of items and publications arrived from all over the world, and in 1970, the “MKCsBK’s Gendarme and Knighthood Museum and Archive” was established and placed into an MKCsBK-financed six-room apartment in Etobicoke, Toronto, Canada, which also served as Capt. Kövendy (Szathmáry)’s home, and provided a guestroom for the museum’s gendarme visitors.

With the declining health of Capt. Kövendy (Szathmáry), the MKCsBK no longer could maintain the collection adequately, so it was transferred to the Hungarian House of Toronto as the “Hungarian Armed Forces Museum and Archives,” and placed under the direction of a “museum committee.” The MKCsBK still had ownership of the material, but its maintenance was in part provided by the Canadian government.

After the fall of communism in Hungary, the collection was transferred to Hungary's Military Institute and Museum in 1999, in collaboration with Dr. Sándor Szakály, the museum's director at the time. MKCsBK had an agreement to place the museum's items into the care of the Ferenc Móra Museum of Szeged, so in due time those items would become a part of a two-room permanent exhibit at the Ópusztaszer Historical Memorial Park. But as the Hungarian government was unwilling to spend any money on this project and the MKCsBK also lacking sufficient funds for it, the process was halted in spite of the contract. The content of the museum is now in storage in the Military Museum in Budapest, unavailable to the Hungarian public, contrary to the MKCsBK's intent and agreement with the authorities, and contrary to the intent of all of those gendarmes who assembled it and contributed to it in the hope of making it available to their nation.

v. Zoltán Kőrössy, an honorary gendarme, had also been collecting gendarme memorabilia on his own, including photographs, objects, documents, and books. Therefore, after the Canadian museum was transferred to the Toronto Hungarian House, the MKCsBK asked its members in 1985 to send any material still in their possession to him for safekeeping and preservation for the future.

As the number of the gendarmes was decreasing, Károly Kövendy (Szathmáry) recommended to establish an honorary gendarme title for those individuals who showed the most effort in the furthering of their work. v. baranchi Endre Tamáska bestowed that rank on its first recipient, v. Zoltán Kőrössy, in 1976.

In 1973, the MKCsBK issued a medal to commemorate the 25-year anniversary of the MKCsBK, and in 1981 to commemorate the 100th anniversary of the establishment of the Hungarian Royal Gendarmerie.

=== 1990–2005: renewing relationships in Hungary ===
Starting in the 1980s, 1st Lt. vitéz Gábor Kiss initiated several efforts to rehabilitate the gendarmerie in Hungary. One of his great achievements was the placing of a commemorative plaque in the courtyard of the Hungarian Military Museum (Budapest), in October 1999. It reads: “To the memory of Hungarian Royal Gendarmes who died a heroic death in WWI and WWII.” They issued a commemorative medal for those present at the unveiling ceremony. Since then, various Hungarian groups participate in a wreath-laying ceremony at the plaque on each Gendarme Day.

1st Lt. vitéz Gábor Kiss also strongly supported the Hungarian Gendarme Fraternal Society (Pál Ságvári, president), whose main purpose remains to keep the gendarme traditions alive.

In order to acquaint the public with the true history of the Hungarian Royal Gendarmerie and to correct the many distortions about them, v. Gábor Kiss organized a yearly Gendarme Day Historical Conference in Florida (1994–2010), and developed a close cooperation with the Szemere Bertalan Magyar Rendvédelem-történeti Tudományos Társaság (Szemere Bertalan Hungarian History of Law Enforcement Academic Society, Dr. József Parádi, president). They mutually attended each other's conferences, and also developed the seed of a gendarme bibliography, as most written material was either destroyed by the communists, or secluded in a few libraries, or scattered abroad by the exiled gendarmes. The members of MKCsBK also sent a written material on the Gendarmerie to the National Széchenyi Library, and v. Zoltán Kőrössy lent exhibit material to the newly opened Criminal and Law Enforcement Museum of Budapest in 1999.

In 1996, the MKCsBK issued a Gendarme Order of Merit medal for those members who contributed the most to these rehabilitation efforts.

==== Steps toward internet presence ====
The MKCsBK wanted to take advantage of the internet to let the world know their true story in 1997, and in 1998, there was an effort to post Bela Rektor's seminal book on the internet, but both of these plans eventually fell through. There was also an unrealized hope of making the archives of the Csendőrségi Lapok and the Bajtársi Levél available online. The website finally came into being in February 2005. The content itself is provided by v. Zoltán Kőrössy, who is also the central director since November 2007. The website today hosts the full texts of numerous books regarding the Hungarian Royal Gendarmerie and large amounts of original publications and documentation, and is slowly making available the full archives of the organization's newsletters

=== 2007-future: publishing historical records ===
In 1968, 95% of the members were still gendarmes. Their number dropped to 30% by 1999 (about 100–150 persons), and to less than 10% by 2010 (24 gendarmes). The number of honorary gendarmes, most of them living in Hungary, has reached 100 by 1999. With the aging and dying out of the original gendarmes, the membership of the MKCsBK now mainly consists of descendants and friends. Accordingly, in 1955 a 21-member gendarme committee provided the leadership under the central director, while the leadership was reduced to a single gendarme by 1985, and in 2007 there was no gendarme living able to carry out that task. Therefore, in November 2007, three still-living gendarme officers elected the MKCsBK's first central director who himself was not a gendarme, but the son of one, v. Zoltán Kőrössy. As the prior central directors became ill and died, no transfer of material (lists of names or document archives) occurred. So, the current “archives” only consists of those documents personally obtained over the years. With the loss of gendarmes and no official dues, the financial support of the organization has also declined, and now mainly relies on the personal support of a few.

In place of the Bajtársi levél, a quarterly Newsletter is sent out both via mail and email, both in Hungarian and English, to keep the connection among the members and to let all interested people know of new developments. The Newsletter can also be found in the Library of the website.

The MKCsBK's goal has also changed with the passage of time. The communist regime destroyed all gendarmerie related material. They only preserved a few copies of certain publications kept under lock in a few libraries, unavailable to the public. The families of gendarmes also destroyed everything related to the Gendarmerie, as their possession would have meant serious consequences for the family. A small portion of books, objects, documents, and photographs survived as they were carried out of the country as a personal possession of the gendarmes who were forced to leave the country at the end of the war. In the absence of the written documents, the communists were free to paint a picture of the gendarmerie as they liked, as there was no objective way of countering their lies.

After the fall of the communism in 1989, the locked-away material was “freed” and now anyone may look at them. But their small number, scattered distribution, and age-related brittleness that prohibits photocopying makes them practically still unavailable to the public and to those desiring to perform historical research. Therefore, the MKCsBK's goal has become the digitization of all original material related to the Gendarmerie, to make it available to everyone interested through the internet. Therefore, a collaboration started between the MKCsBK and the Szemere Bertalan Hungarian History of Law Enforcement Academic Society (Szemere Bertalan Magyar Rendvédelem-történeti Tudományos Társaság). With the expert help of the Society's president, Dr. József Parádi, the bibliography is now extended and contains all gendarme books we are aware of, even though very likely a large portion, possibly about half of them, no longer can be found.

After a year-and-a-half of hard work, all the laws and regulations from 1881 through 1945, which directed the work of the gendarmerie to the smallest detail, are now also available on the website. The gendarmerie is the first Hungarian law-enforcement agency, past or present, which has all its legal material posted on the internet.

The digitization of the books is currently ongoing. Of the 257 books in the bibliography, now over sixty books can be read in their entirety through the website, aided by a separate list of contents and extensive bookmarking of the PDF documents. The library soon will also contain the material written by the gendarmes in exile: all available issues of the Bajtársi levél.

In addition, hundreds of original documents, other writings, and over 1500 photographs are posted on the website.

A biographical section was added in 2011 to the website's library. Presently, it only contains material on a few gendarmes, whose families contributed the pictures and information, but the section will be greatly expanded in the near future. Gendarme first Lt. George Perjesi spent a lifetime collecting biographical data on all gendarmes. He recently transferred his extensive collection to v. Zoltan Kőrössy for digitization of the vast collection for the website.

There are also plans to expand the English material available on the website.

Thus, the website will not only serve as a research library for laymen as well as for historians, but will also serve as a virtual museum, which the Hungarian nation still lacks, to provide a source for people all over the world to learn the truth about the Hungarian Royal Gendarmerie, not available to them anywhere else. With these, finally it will be possible to counter the severe distortions and overt lies the communist propagated against the gendarmerie and restore the deserved good reputation and honor of the Hungarian Royal Gendarmerie, worldwide.

== See also ==
- Hungary in World War II
- List of veterans organizations
