= Kereki =

- Village
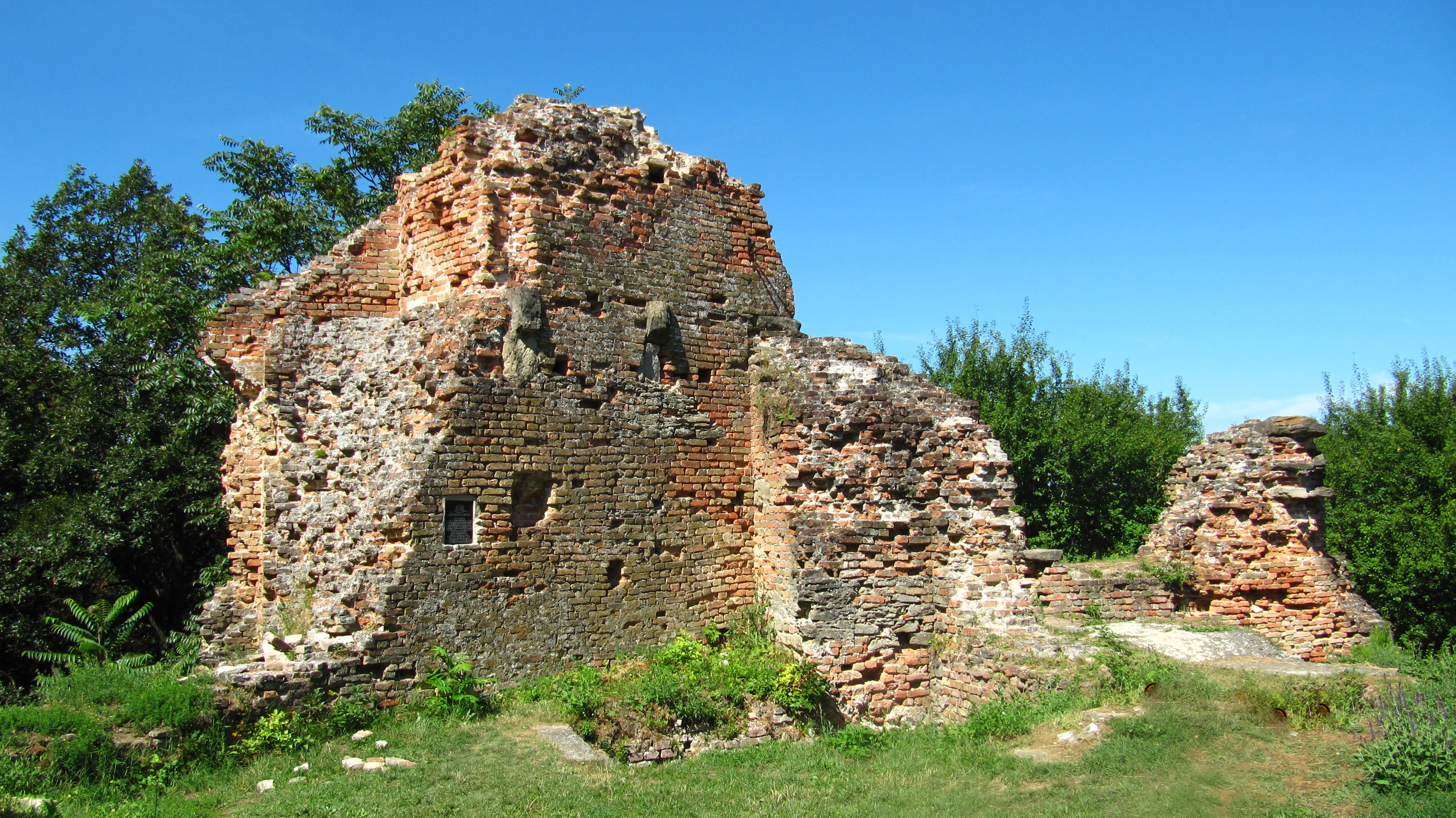
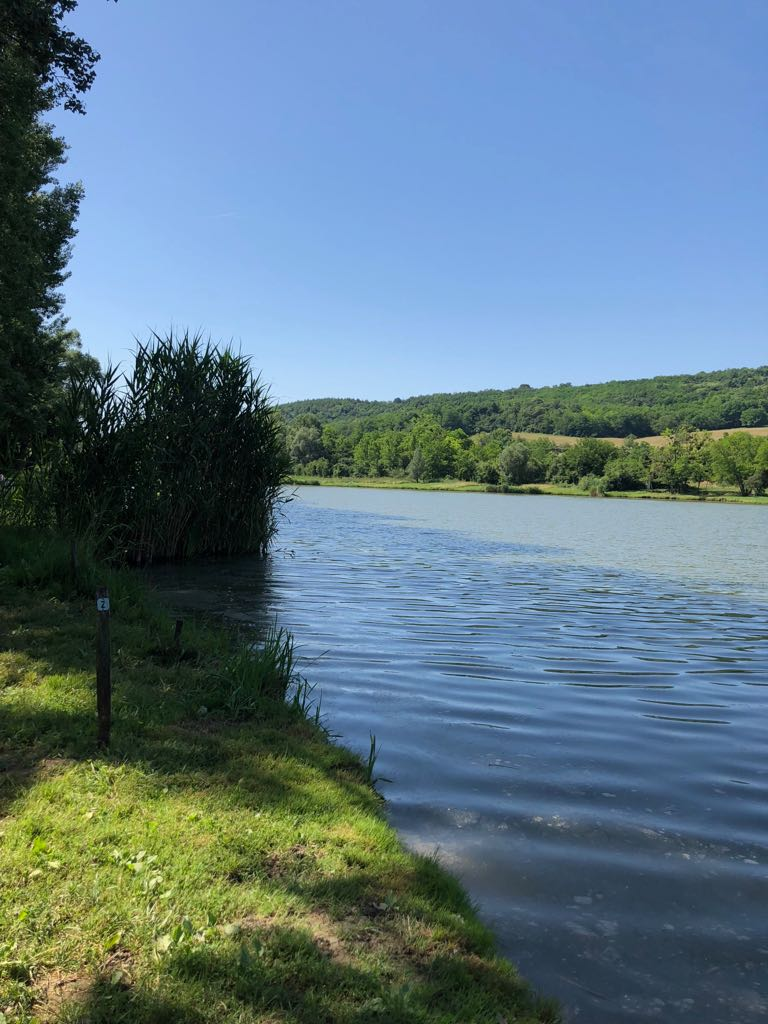
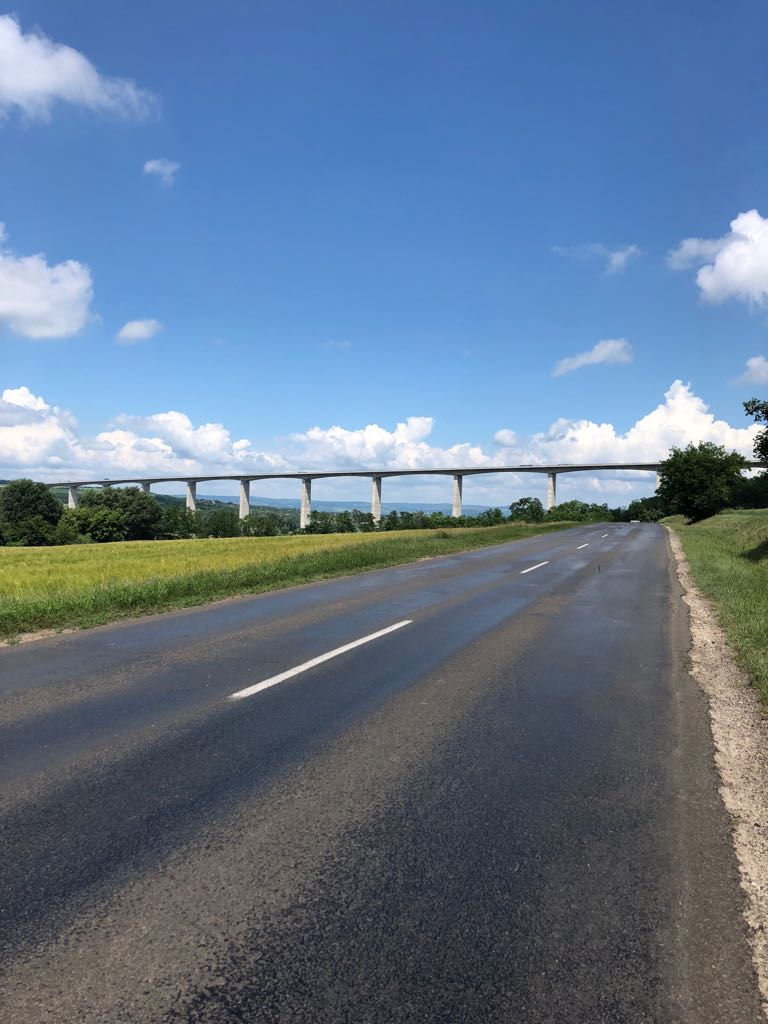
- Descending, from top: ruins of Fejérkő Castle above Kereki, fishing pond, scenery on the road to the north

- Coat of arms

- Location of Somogy county in Hungary

- Location of Kereki
- Coordinates: 46.79676°N 17.91215°E
- Country: Hungary
- Region: Southern Transdanubia
- County: Somogy
- District: Siófok
- RC Diocese: Kaposvár

Area
  - Total: 14.43 km^{2} (5.57 sq mi)

Population (2017)
  - Total: 534
  - Density: 37.0/km^{2} (95.8/sq mi)
- Demonym: Kereki
- Time zone: UTC+1 (CET)
  - Summer (DST): UTC+2 (CEST)
- Postal code: 8618
- Area code: (+36) 84
- Patron Saint: Saint Anne
- Motorways: M7
- Distance from Budapest: 125 km (78 mi) Northeast
- NUTS 3 code: HU232
- MP: Mihály Witzmann (Fidesz)

Kereki is a village in Somogy county, Hungary.

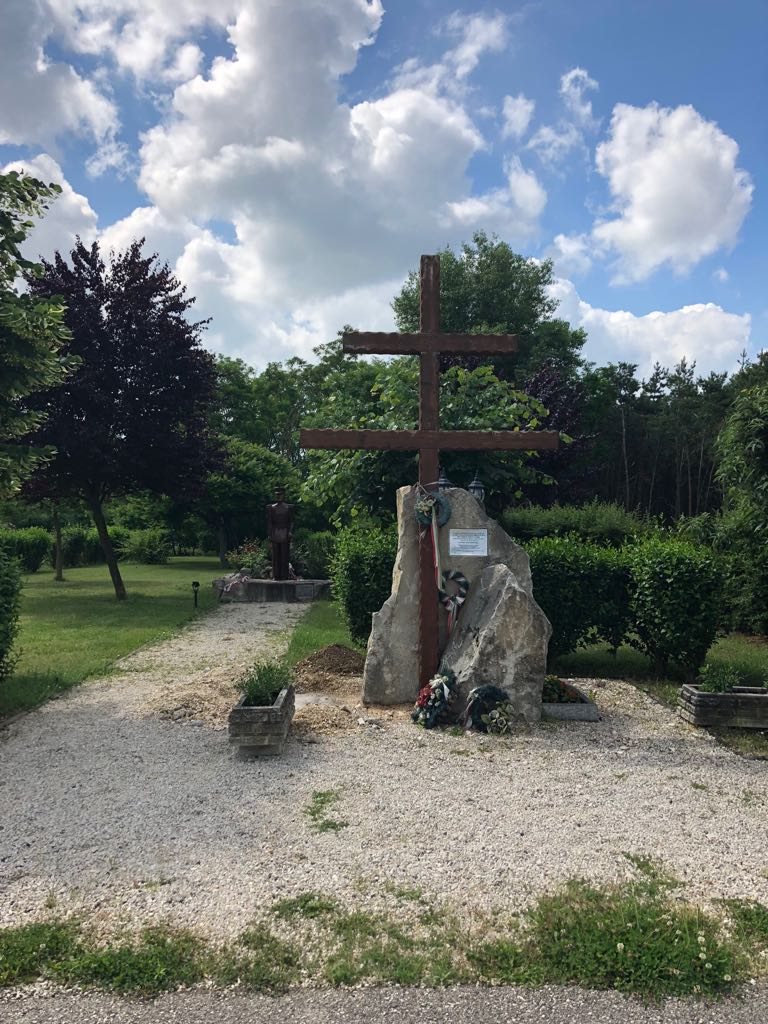
Hungarian cross

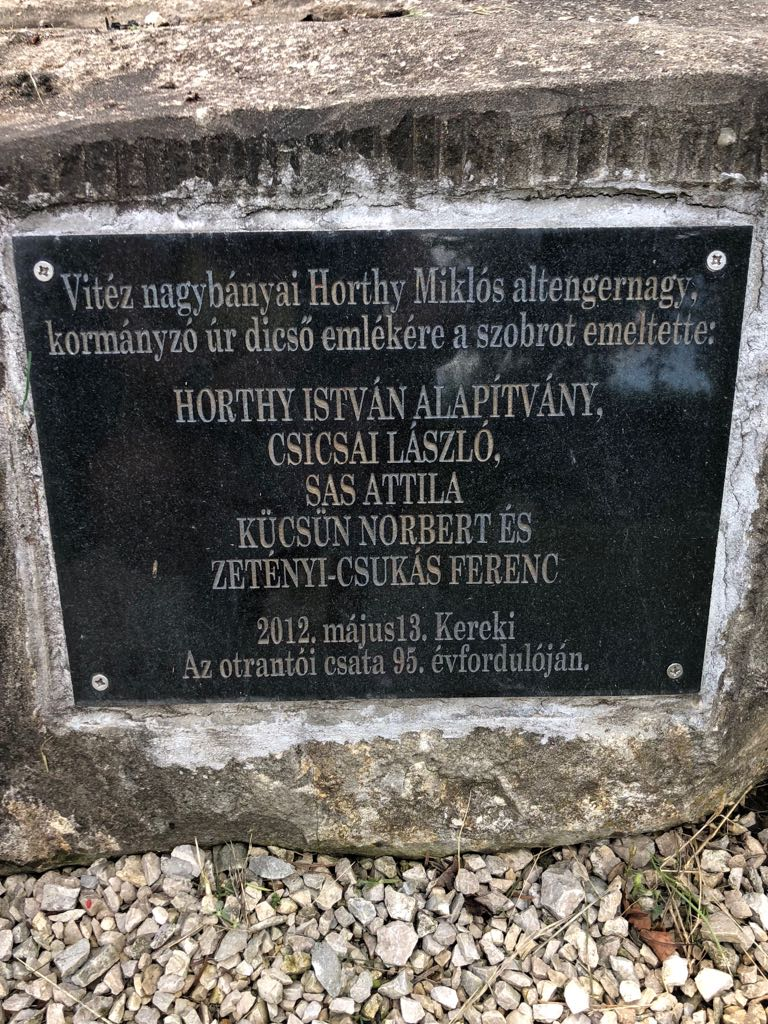
Horthy Plaque

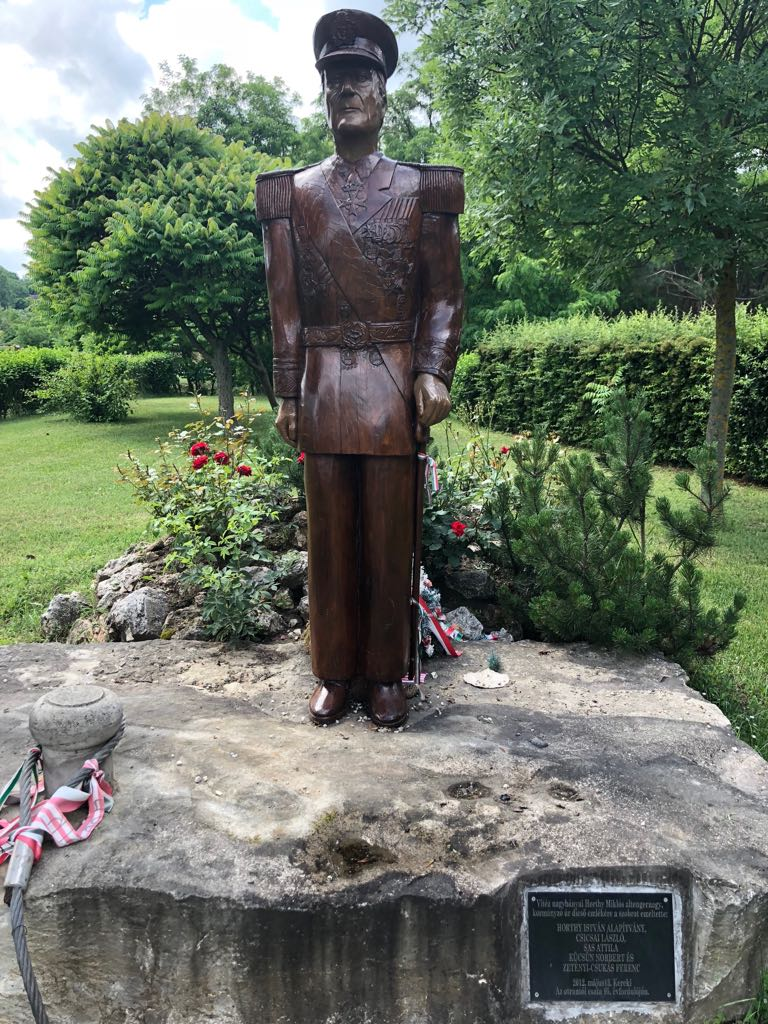
Horthy Statue
