= A Life for Hungary =

1953 memoir by Nikolaus von Horthy

- First edition (publ. Athenäum)
- Author: Nikolaus von Horthy
- Original title: Ein Leben für Ungarn
- Language: German
- Subject: Politics of Hungary
- Dewey Decimal: 943.9051092
- LC Class: DB950.H6

Ein Leben für Ungarn (A Life for Hungary) are the memoirs of Nikolaus von Horthy (also known as Miklós Horthy), Regent of Hungary. They were published in German under the name of Nikolaus von Horthy when he was exiled in Portugal after World War II.

In his memoirs, Horthy recounted personal experiences from his youth until the end of World War II. He also claimed that he tried to perform the best actions and appoint the best officials in his country, and documented what he saw as mistreatment of Hungary by some other countries in the aftermath of World War I.
