= Miklós Horthy =

Regent of Hungary from 1920 to 1944

His Serene Highness Vitéz Miklós Horthy de Nagybánya
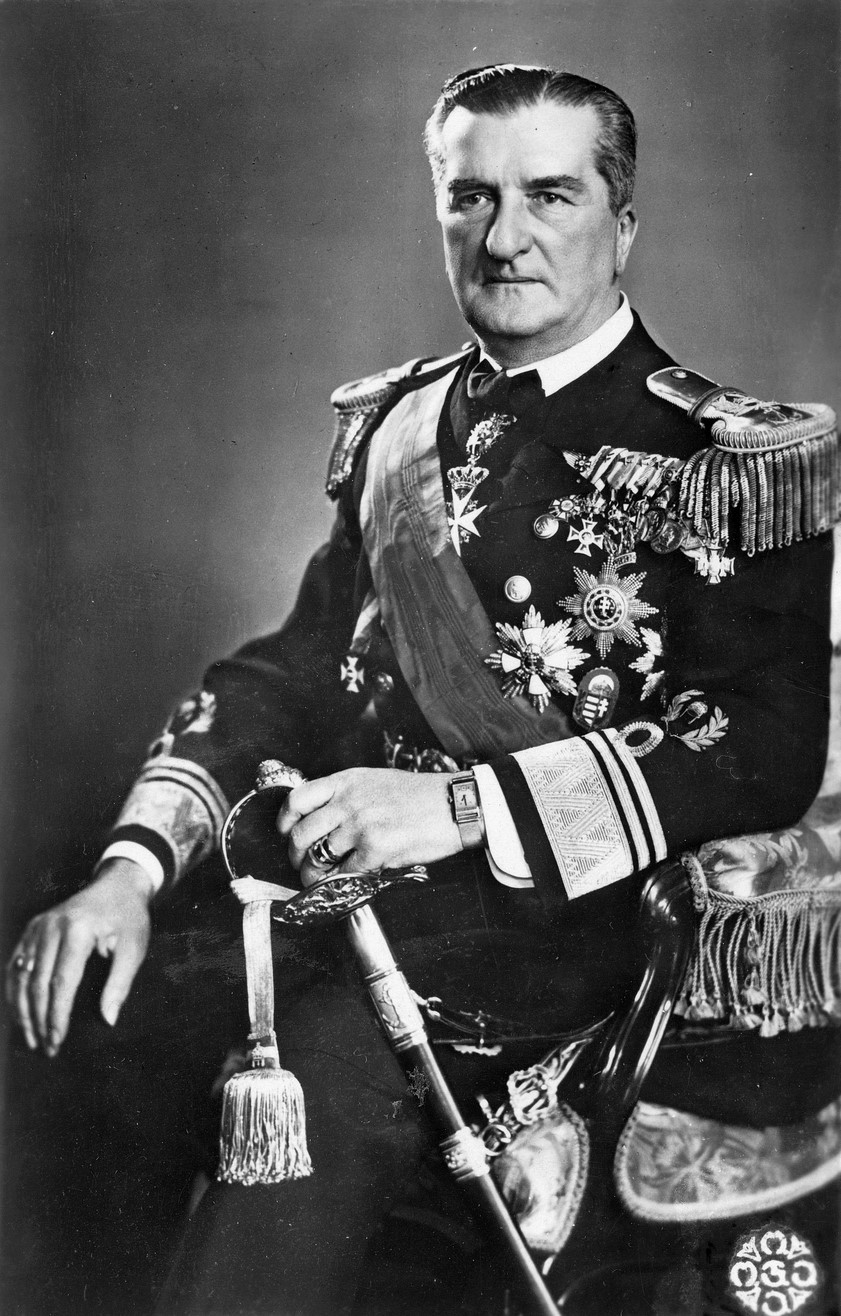
- Official portrait, 1941

Regent of the Kingdom of Hungary
- In office 1 March 1920 – 16 October 1944
- Monarch: Vacant
- Prime Minister: See list: Károly Huszár S. Simonyi-Semadam Pál Teleki István Bethlen Gyula Károlyi Gyula Gömbös Kálmán Darányi Béla Imrédy Pál Teleki F. Keresztes-Fischer (acting) László Bárdossy F. Keresztes-Fischer (acting) Miklós Kállay Döme Sztójay Géza Lakatos
- Deputy: István Horthy (1942)
- Preceded by: Károly Huszár (as acting head of state)
- Succeeded by: Ferenc Szálasi (as Leader of the Nation)

Minister of War of the Counter-Revolutionary Government of Hungary
- In office 31 May – 12 July 1919
- Prime Minister: Gyula Károlyi
- Preceded by: Zoltán Szabó
- Succeeded by: Sándor Belitska

Commander-in-Chief of the Austro-Hungarian Naval Fleet
- In office 1 March – 1 November 1918
- Monarch: Charles I
- Minister-President of Austria: Ernst Seidler von Feuchtenegg; Max Hussarek von Heinlein; Heinrich Lammasch
- Chief of the Naval Section of the War Ministry: Franz von Holub
- Preceded by: Maximilian Njegovan
- Succeeded by: Position abolished

Commander-in-Chief of the Hungarian National Army
- In office 6 June 1919 – 1 April 1920
- Head of State: Archduke Joseph August (Note: As Regent of Hungary); István Friedrich (as acting); Károly Huszár (as acting); Himself (Note: As Regent of Hungary)
- Prime Minister: Dezső Pattantyús-Ábrahám; Gyula Peidl; István Friedrich (as acting until 15 August 1919); Sándor Simonyi-Semadam
- Minister of War: Sándor Belitska; József Haubrich; Ferenc Schnetzer; István Friedrich; Károly Soós
- Preceded by: Position established
- Succeeded by: Béla Berzeviczy

Supreme Warlord of the Royal Hungarian Army
- In office 1 March 1920 – 16 October 1944
- Regent: Himself
- Preceded by: Himself (as Commander-in-Chief of the Hungarian National Army)
- Succeeded by: Ferenc Szálasi

Personal details
- Born: Miklós Horthy de Nagybánya; 18 June 1868 Kenderes, Austria-Hungary
- Died: 9 February 1957 (aged 88) Estoril, Portugal
- Spouse: Magdolna Purgly (m. 1901)
- Children: 4, including István and Miklós
- Parents: István Horthy; Paula Halassy

Military service
- Allegiance: Austria-Hungary
- Branch/service: Austro-Hungarian Navy
- Years of service: 1896–1918
- Rank: Vice Admiral (Flottenkommandant)
- Commands: Imperial and Royal Fleet; Hungarian National Army
- Battles/wars: World War I; Otranto Strait (WIA); World War II; Raid on Premuda

Miklós Horthy de Nagybánya (Note: Hungarian: Vitéz (Note: "Vitéz" refers to a Hungarian knightly order founded by Miklós Horthy ("Vitézi Rend"); literally, "vitéz" means "knight" or "valiant".) Nagybányai Horthy Miklós; Hungarian pronunciation: [ˈviteːz ˈnɒɟbaːɲɒi ˈhorti ˈmikloːʃ]; English: Nicholas Horthy; German: Nikolaus Horthy von Nagybánya) (18 June 1868 – 9 February 1957) was a Hungarian admiral and statesman who was the regent of the Kingdom of Hungary during the interwar period and most of World War II, from 1 March 1920 to 15 October 1944.

Horthy began his career as a sub-lieutenant in the Austro-Hungarian Navy in 1896 and attained the rank of rear admiral by 1918. He participated in the Battle of the Strait of Otranto and ascended to the position of commander-in-chief of the Navy in the final year of World War I. Following mutinies, Emperor-King Charles I and IV appointed him a vice admiral and commander of the Fleet, dismissing the previous admiral. During the revolutions and interventions in Hungary from Czechoslovakia, Romania and Yugoslavia, Horthy returned to Budapest with the National Army. Subsequently, the Diet of Hungary offered him the position of Regent of Hungary, while the House of Habsburg and Hungarian monarchy was formally dethroned.

Throughout the interwar period, Horthy led an administration characterized by national conservatism, anti-Semitism and anti-Communism. Under his leadership, Hungary banned the Hungarian Communist Party and the far-right Arrow Cross Party led by Ferenc Szálasi, and pursued a revanchist foreign policy in response to the 1920 Treaty of Trianon. The former King of Hungary, Charles IV, attempted to return to Hungary twice before the Hungarian government yielded to Allied threats of renewed hostilities in 1921. Subsequently, Charles was escorted out of Hungary and into exile.

Ideologically a national conservative, Horthy has sometimes been labelled as a fascist. In the late 1930s, Horthy's foreign policy led him into an alliance with Nazi Germany against the Soviet Union. With the support of Adolf Hitler, Hungary succeeded in reoccupying certain areas ceded to neighbouring countries by the Treaty of Trianon. Under Horthy's leadership, Hungary provided support to Polish refugees when Germany attacked their country in 1939, and participated in the Axis powers' invasion of the Soviet Union in June 1941. Some historians view Horthy as unenthusiastic about contributing to the German war effort and the Holocaust in Hungary (out of fear that it would sabotage peace deals with Allied forces); in addition, several attempts were made to strike a secret deal with the Allies of World War II after it had become obvious that the Axis would lose the war, therefore eventually leading the Germans to invade and take control of the country in March 1944. However, prior to the Nazi occupation of Hungary, 63,000 Jews were murdered. In late 1944, 437,000 Jews were deported to Auschwitz II-Birkenau, where the majority (80%) were exterminated on arrival in gas chambers. Serbian historian Zvonimir Golubović has claimed that not only was Horthy aware of these genocidal massacres, but had approved of them, such as those in the Novi Sad raid, though British historian Mark Mazower argues that Horthy ordered an investigation into the massacre, helping in bringing criminal charges onto some of the perpetrators.

In October 1944, Horthy announced that Hungary had declared an armistice with the Soviets and had withdrawn from the Axis. He was forced to resign, placed under arrest by the Germans and taken to Bavaria, while the Arrow Cross Party ruled Hungary. At the end of the war, he came under the custody of American troops. After providing evidence for the Ministries Trial of war crimes in 1948, Horthy settled and lived out his remaining years in exile in Portugal. His memoirs, Ein Leben für Ungarn (A Life for Hungary), was first published in 1953. He has a reputation as a controversial historical figure in contemporary Hungary.

== Early life and naval career ==
Miklós Horthy de Nagybánya was born at Kenderes, to an untitled Hungarian noble family; his ancestor István Horti had been ennobled by King Ferdinand II in 1635. His father, István Horthy de Nagybánya, was a member of the House of Magnates, the upper chamber of the Diet of Hungary, and lord of a 610-hectare (1,500-acre) estate. He married Hungarian noblewoman Paula Halassy de Dévaványa in 1857. Miklós was the fourth of their eight children, who were raised as Protestants in the Reformed Church of Hungary.

Aged 14, Horthy joined the Austro-Hungarian Navy, as a cadet at the Imperial and Royal Naval Academy in Fiume. Because the official language of the naval academy was German, Horthy spoke Hungarian with a slight, but noticeable, Austro-German accent for the rest of his life. He also spoke Italian, Croatian, English, and French.

As a young man, Horthy traveled around the world and was a diplomat for Austria-Hungary in the Ottoman Empire and other countries. Horthy married Magdolna Purgly de Jószáshely in Arad in 1901. They had four children: Magdolna (1902), Paula (1903), István (1904), and Miklós (1907). From 1911 until 1914, he was a naval aide-de-camp to Emperor Franz Joseph I of Austria, for whom he had great respect.

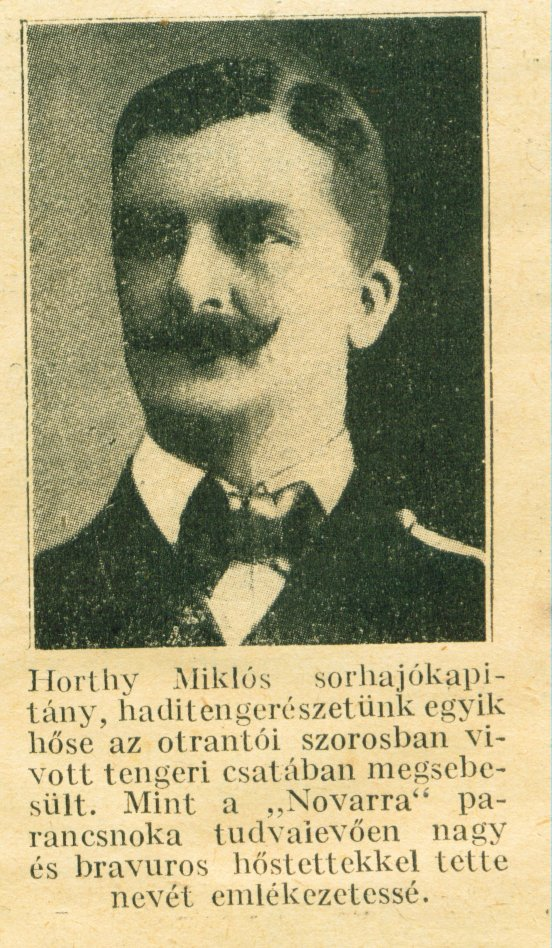
Miklós Horthy in a newspaper 1917. The picture was shot in 1910.

At the beginning of World War I, Horthy commanded the pre-dreadnought battleship SMS Habsburg. In 1915, he earned a reputation for boldness while commanding the new light cruiser SMS Novara. He planned the 1917 attack on the Otranto Barrage, which resulted in the Battle of the Strait of Otranto, the largest naval engagement of the war in the Adriatic Sea. A consolidated British, French, and Italian fleet met the Austro-Hungarian force. Despite the numerical superiority of the Allied fleet, the Austrian force emerged victorious from the battle. The Austrian fleet remained relatively unscathed; however, Horthy was wounded. After the Cattaro mutiny of February 1918, Emperor Charles I of Austria selected Horthy over multiple other senior commanders as the new Commander-in-Chief of the Imperial Fleet in March 1918. In June, Horthy planned another attack on Otranto, and in a departure from the cautious strategy of his predecessors, he committed the empire's battleships to the mission. While sailing through the night, the dreadnought SMS Szent István met Italian MAS torpedo boats and was sunk, causing Horthy to abort the mission. He managed to preserve the rest of the empire's fleet until he was ordered by Emperor Charles to surrender it to the new State of Slovenes, Croats and Serbs (the predecessor of Yugoslavia) on 31 October.

The end of the war saw Hungary turn into a landlocked nation, and with that, the new government had little need for Horthy's naval expertise. He retired with his family to his private estate at Kenderes.

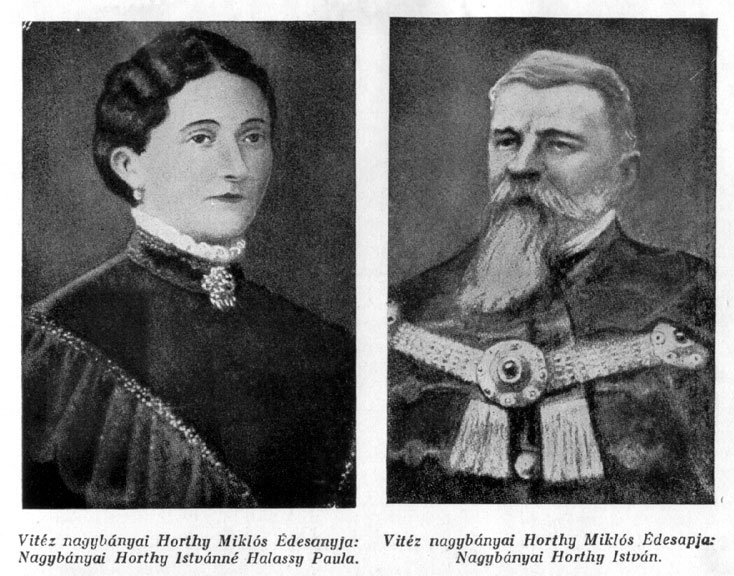
Miklós Horthy's parents: Paula Halassy and István Horthy

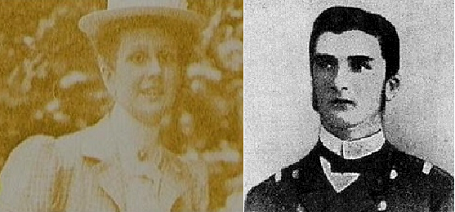
Magdolna Purgly, Horthy's wife, and Horthy as an ensign in the Navy

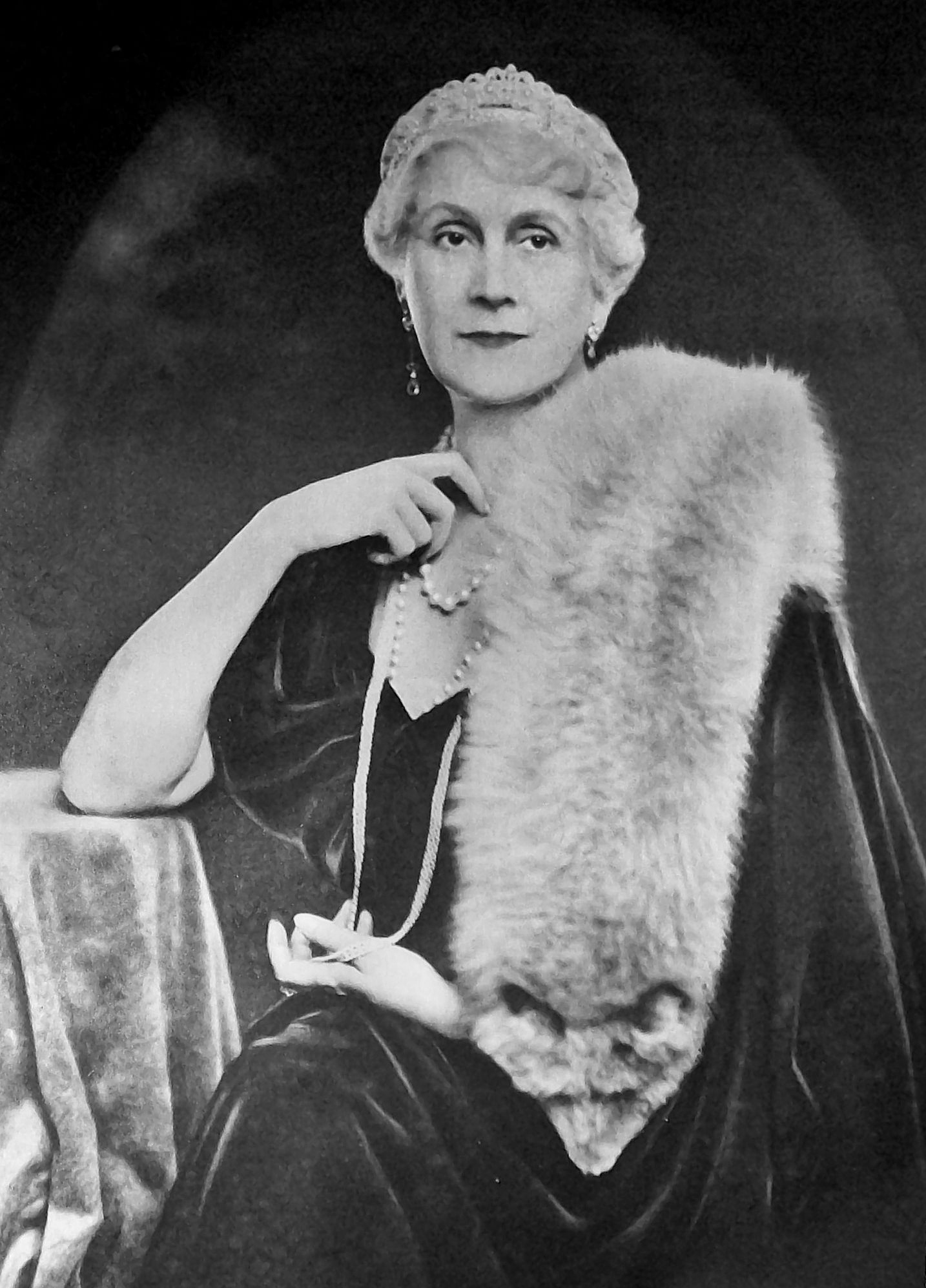
Magdolna Purgly, wife of Admiral Miklós Horthy

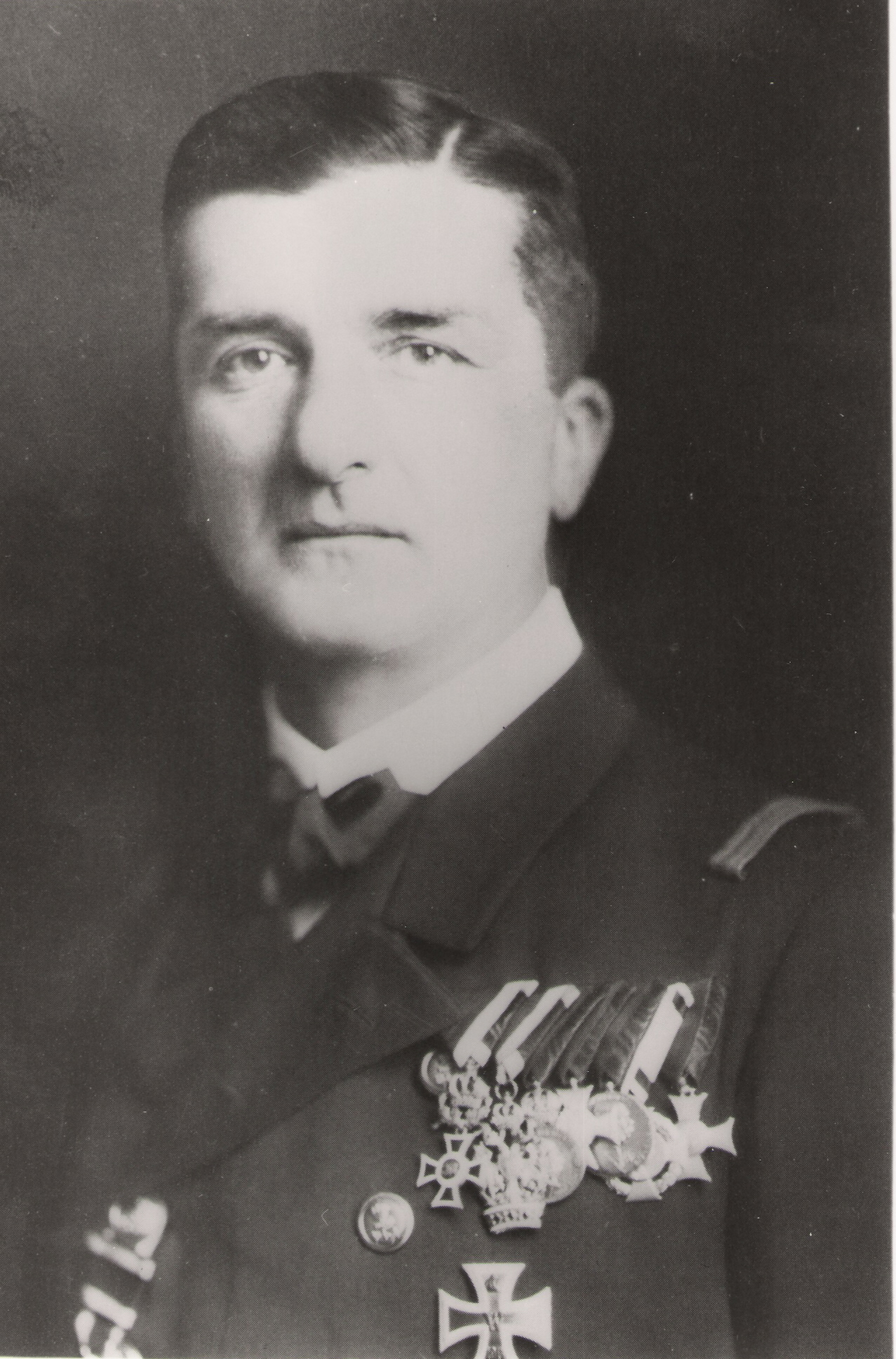
Admiral Miklós Horthy during World War I

=== Dates of rank and assignments ===
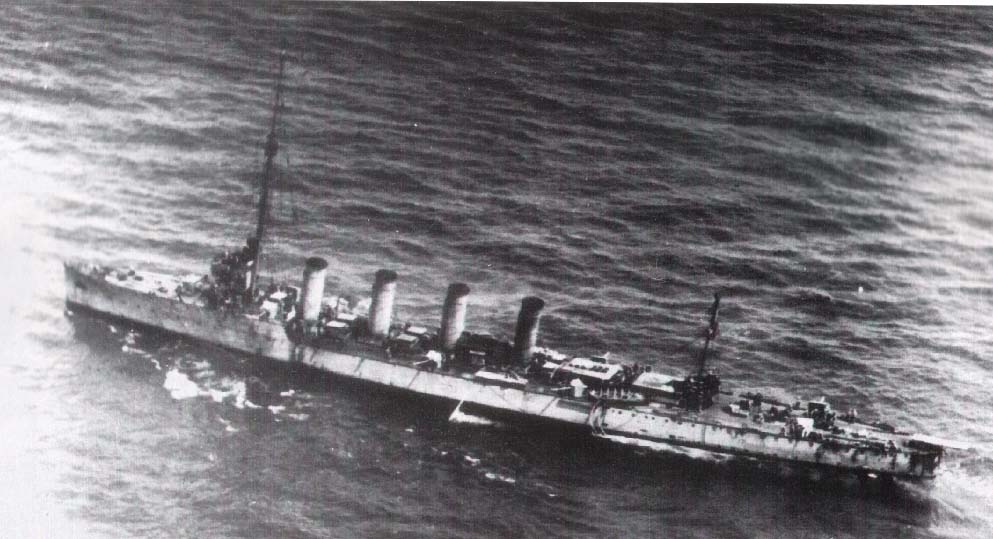
The damaged SMS Novara after the Battle of Otranto

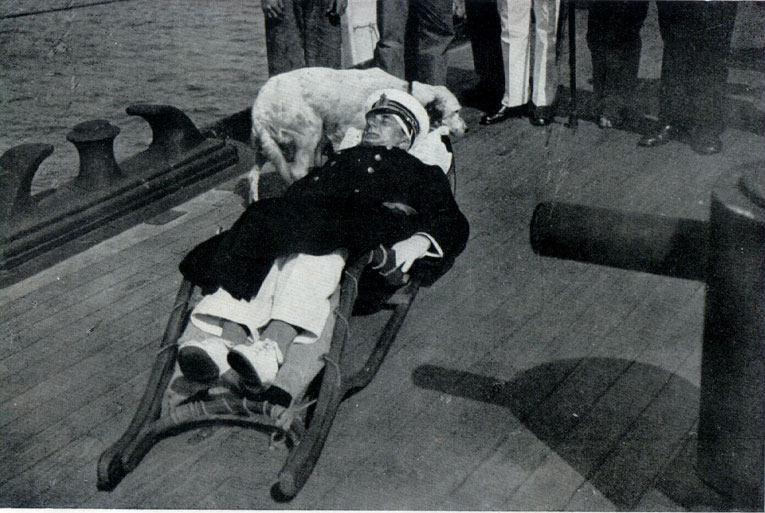
Horthy, seriously wounded, commanded the fleet at the Battle of the Strait of Otranto until falling unconscious

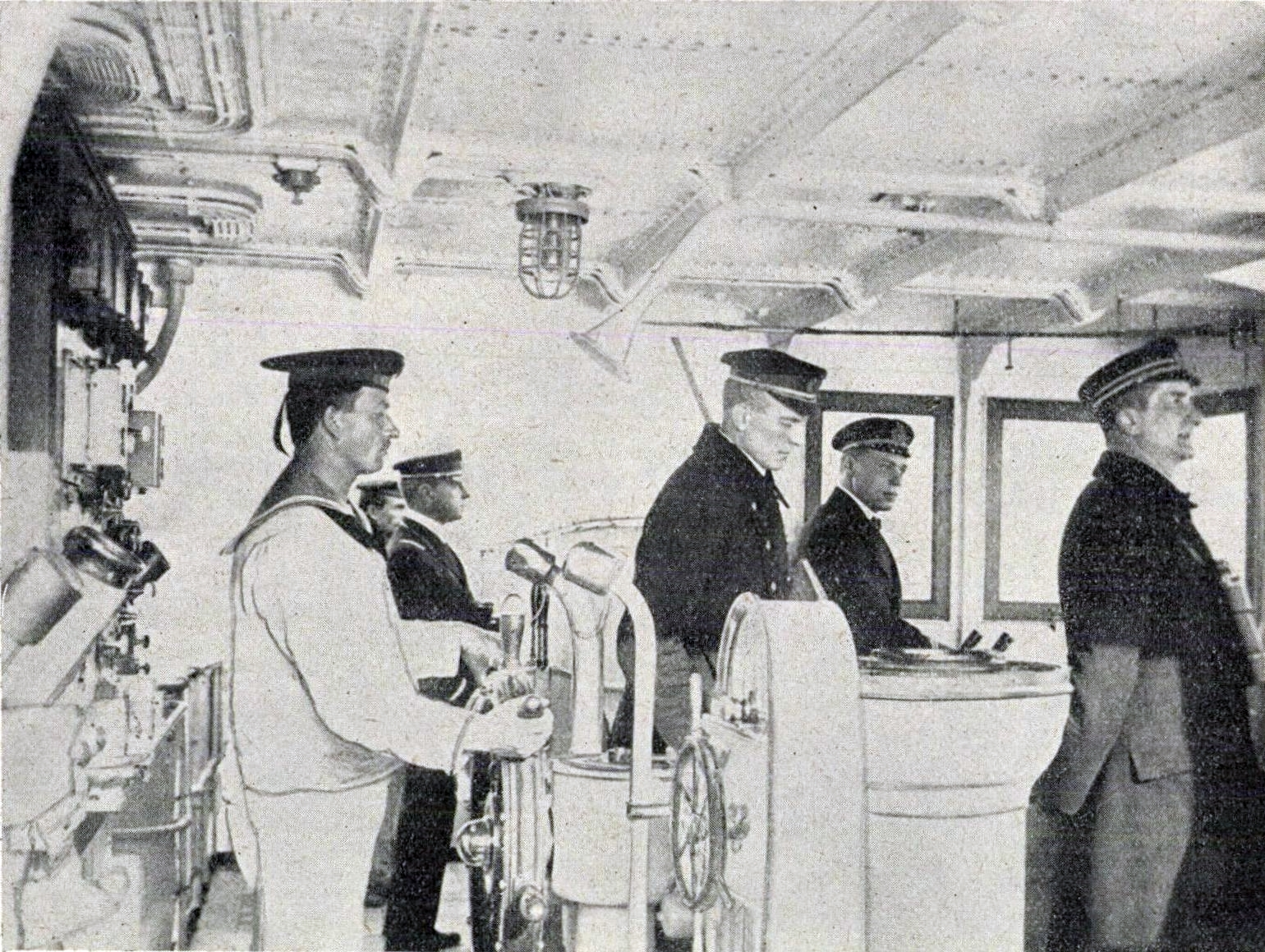
Horthy in the Novara(1917)

- 1896 Fregattenleutnant (Frigate Lieutenant) (fregatthadnagy – Sub-Lieutenant)
- 1900 Linienschiffleutnant (Ship-of-the-Line Lieutenant) (sorhajóhadnagy – Lieutenant)
- January 1901 SMS Sperber (commander of the vessel)
- 1902 SMS Kranich (commander of the vessel)
- June 1908 SMS Taurus (commander of the vessel)
- August 1908 SMS Kaiser Karl VI (GDO-Gesamtdetailoffizier-First Officer, temporary)
- 1 January 1909, Korvettenkapitän (Corvette Captain) (korvettkapitány – Lieutenant-Commander)
- 1 November 1909 aide-de-camp to Emperor Franz Josef
- 1 November 1911: Fregattenkapitän (Frigate Captain) (fregattkapitány – Commander)
- December 1912 March 1913 SMS Budapest (commander of the vessel)
- 20 January 1914: Linienschiffskapitän (Ship-of-the-Line Captain) (sorhajókapitány – Captain)
- August 1914 SMS Habsburg (commander of the vessel)
- December 1914 SMS Novara (commander of the vessel)
- 1 February 1918 SMS Prinz Eugen (1912) (commander of the vessel)
- 27 February 1918, Konteradmiral (ellentengernagy – Rear Admiral)
- 27 February 1918 appointed Commander in Chief (the last one) of the fleet by Emperor Karl I (ahead of 11 admirals and 24 senior Linienschiffskapitän)
- 1 November 1918, Vizeadmiral (altengernagy – Vice Admiral, though no navy existed anymore)

== Interwar period, 1919–1939 ==
Historians agree on the conservatism of interwar Hungary. Historian István Deák states:

Between 1919 and 1944, Hungary was a rightist country. Forged out of a counter-revolutionary heritage, its governments advocated a "nationalist Christian" policy; they extolled heroism, faith, and unity; they despised the French Revolution; and they spurned the liberal and socialist ideologies of the 19th century. The governments saw Hungary as a bulwark against Bolshevism and Bolshevism's instruments: socialism, cosmopolitanism, and freemasonry. They perpetrated the rule of a small clique of aristocrats, civil servants, and army officers, and surrounded with adulation by the head of the state, the counterrevolutionary Admiral Horthy.

=== Commander of the National Army ===
Horthy enters Budapest, 16 November 1919 (1080p film footage)

Two national traumas that followed the First World War profoundly shaped the spirit and future of the Hungarian nation. The first was the loss, as dictated by the Allies of World War I, of large portions of Hungarian territory that had bordered other countries. These were lands that had belonged to Hungary (then part of Austria-Hungary) but were now ceded mainly to Czechoslovakia, Romania, Austria and the Kingdom of Serbs, Croats and Slovenes. The excisions, eventually ratified in the Treaty of Trianon of 1920, cost Hungary two-thirds of its territory and one-third of its native Hungarian speakers; this dealt the population a terrible psychological blow. The second trauma began in March 1919, when Communist leader Béla Kun seized power in the capital, Budapest, after the first proto-democratic government in Hungary faltered.

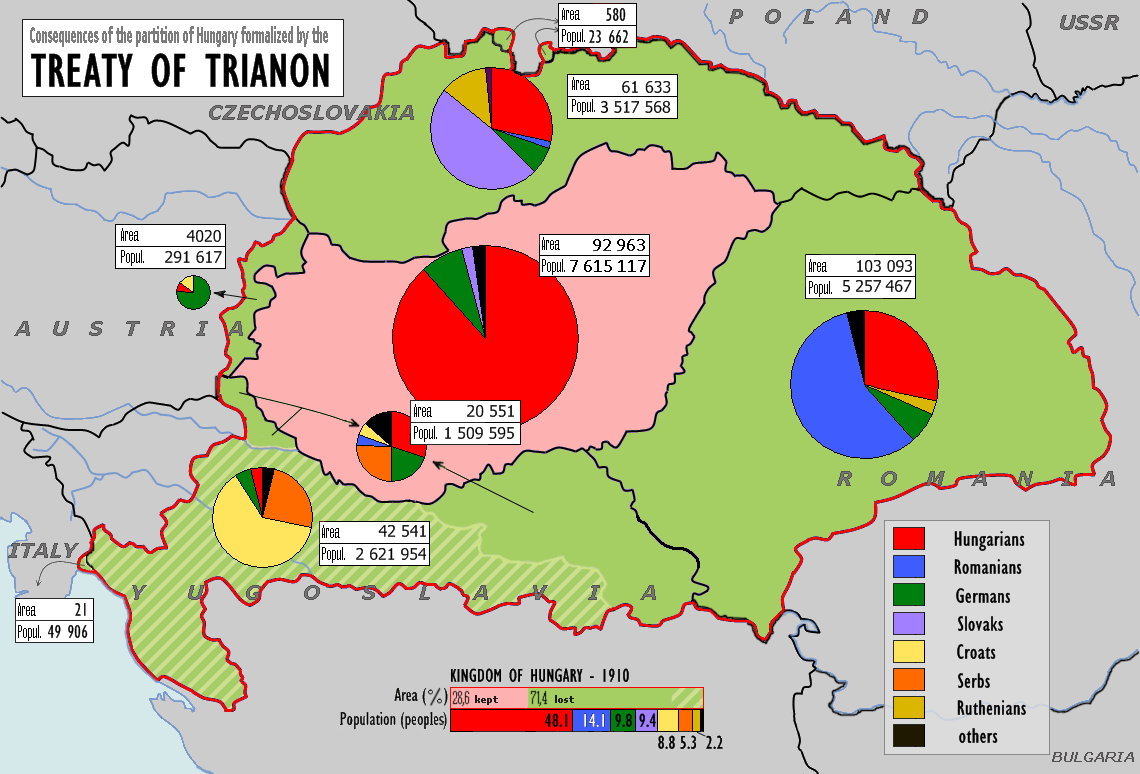
With the Treaty of Trianon, the Kingdom of Hungary lost 71% of its territory (including Croatia) and 3.3 million people of Hungarian ethnicity.

Kun and his loyalists proclaimed a Hungarian Soviet Republic and promised the restoration of Hungary's former grandeur. Instead, his efforts at reconquest failed, and Hungarians were treated to Soviet-style repression in the form of armed gangs who intimidated or murdered enemies of the regime. This period of violence came to be known as the Red Terror.

Within weeks of his coup, Kun's popularity plummeted. On May 30, 1919, anti-communist politicians formed a counter-revolutionary government in the southern city of Szeged, which was occupied by French forces at the time. There, Gyula Károlyi, the prime minister of the counter-revolutionary government, asked former Admiral Horthy, still considered a war hero, to be the Minister of War in the new government and take command of a counter-revolutionary force that would be named the National Army (Hungarian: Nemzeti Hadsereg). Horthy consented, and he arrived in Szeged on 6 June. Soon afterward, because of orders from the Allied powers, a cabinet was reformed, and Horthy was not given a seat in it. Undaunted, Horthy managed to retain control of the National Army by detaching the army command from the War Ministry.

After the Communist government collapsed and its leaders fled, French-supported Romanian forces entered Budapest on August 6, 1919. In retaliation for the Red Terror, reactionary crews exacted revenge in a two-year wave of violent repression known today as the White Terror. These reprisals were organized and carried out by officers of Horthy's National Army, particularly Pál Prónay, Gyula Ostenburg-Moravek and Iván Héjjas. Their victims were primarily communists, social democrats, and Jews. Most Hungarian Jews were not supporters of the Bolsheviks, but much of the leadership of the Hungarian Soviet Republic had been young Jewish intellectuals, and anger about the Communist revolution easily translated into anti-Semitic hostility.

In Budapest, Prónay installed his unit in the Hotel Britannia, where the group swelled to battalion size. Their program of vicious attacks continued; they planned a citywide pogrom against the Jews until Horthy found out and put a stop to it. In his diary, Prónay reported that Horthy:

reproached me for the many Jewish corpses found in the various parts of the country, especially in the Transdanubia. This, he emphasized, gave the foreign press extra ammunition against us. He told me that we should stop harassing small Jews; instead, we should kill some big (Kun government) Jews such as Somogyi or Vázsonyi – these people deserve punishment much more... in vain, I tried to convince him that the liberal papers would be against us anyway, and it did not matter that we killed only one Jew or we killed them all.

The degree of Horthy's responsibility for the excesses of Prónay is disputed. On several occasions, Horthy reached out to stop Prónay from a particularly excessive burst of anti-Jewish cruelty, and the Jews of Pest went on record absolving Horthy of responsibility for the White Terror as early as the autumn of 1919, when they released a statement disavowing the Kun revolution and blaming the terror on a few units within the National Army. Horthy has never been found to have personally engaged in White Terror atrocities. According to American biographer Thomas L. Sakmyster, he "tacitly supported the right-wing officer detachments" who carried out the terror; Horthy called them "my best men." The admiral also had practical reasons for overlooking the terror his officers wrought, since he needed the dedicated officers to help stabilize the country. Nevertheless, it was at least another year before the terror died down. In the summer of 1920, Horthy's government took measures to rein in and eventually disperse the reactionary battalions. Prónay managed to undermine these measures, but only for a short time. Prónay was put on trial for extorting a wealthy Jewish politician and for "insulting the President of the Parliament" by trying to cover up the extortion. Found guilty on both charges, Prónay was now a liability and an embarrassment. His command was revoked, and he was denounced as a common criminal on the floor of the Hungarian parliament.

After serving short jail sentences, Prónay tried to convince Horthy to restore his battalion command. The Prónay Battalion lingered for a few months more under the command of a junior officer, but the government officially dissolved the unit in January 1922, and expelled its members from the army. Prónay entered politics as a member of the government's right-wing opposition. In the 1930s, he sought and failed to emulate the Nazis by generating a Hungarian fascist mass movement. In 1932, he was charged with incitement, sentenced to six months in prison, and stripped of his rank of lieutenant colonel. Prónay would support the pro-Nazi Arrow Cross and lead attacks on Jews before being captured by Soviet troops sometime during or after the Battle of Budapest of 1944–45, dying in captivity in 1947/48.

Precisely how much Horthy knew about the excesses of the White Terror is not known. Horthy himself declined to apologize for the savagery of his officer detachments, writing later, "I have no reason to gloss over deeds of injustice and atrocities committed when an iron broom alone could sweep the country clean." He endorsed Edgar von Schmidt-Pauli's poetic justification of the White reprisals ("Hell let loose on earth cannot be subdued by the beating of angels' wings"), remarking, "the Communists in Hungary, willing disciples of the Russian Bolshevists, had indeed let hell loose."

The International Committee of the Red Cross (ICRC) in an internal report by delegate George Burnier, stated the following in April 1920:

There are two distinct military organizations in Hungary: the national army and a kind of civil guard which was formed when the communist régime fell. It is the latter that has been responsible for all the reprehensible acts committed. The Government managed to regain control of these organizations only a few weeks ago. They are now well-disciplined and collaborate with the municipal police forces.

This deep hostility toward Communism would be the more lasting legacy of Kun's abortive revolution. It was a conviction shared by Horthy and his country's ruling class that would help drive Hungary into a fateful alliance with Adolf Hitler.

The nation of the Hungarians loved and admired Budapest, which became its polluter in the last years. Here, on the banks of the Danube, I arraign her. This city has disowned her thousand years of tradition, she has dragged the Holy Crown and the national colors in the dust, she has clothed herself in red rags. The finest of the nation she threw into dungeons or drove into exile. She laid in ruin our property and wasted our wealth. Yet the nearer we approached to this city, the more rapidly did the ice in our hearts melt. We are now ready to forgive her.

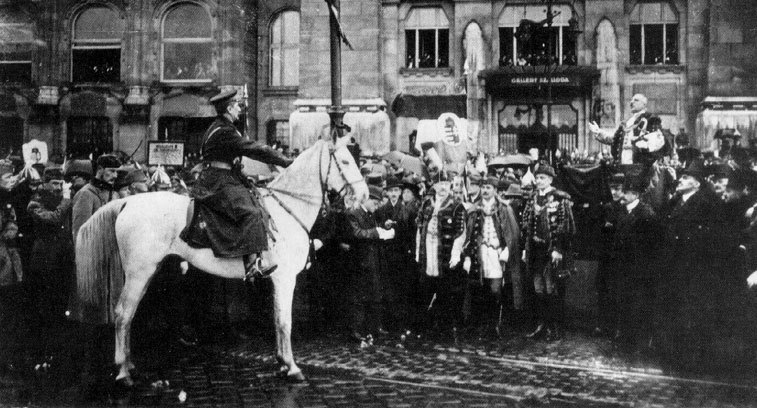
Admiral Miklós Horthy enters Budapest at the head of the National Army, 16 November 1919. He is greeted by city officials in front of the Gellért Hotel. The Romanian army retreated from Budapest on 14 November, leaving Horthy to enter the city, where in a fiery speech he accused the capital's citizens of betraying Hungary by supporting Bolshevism

Following the pressure of the Allied powers, Romanian troops finally evacuated Hungary on February 25 February 1920.

=== Regent ===
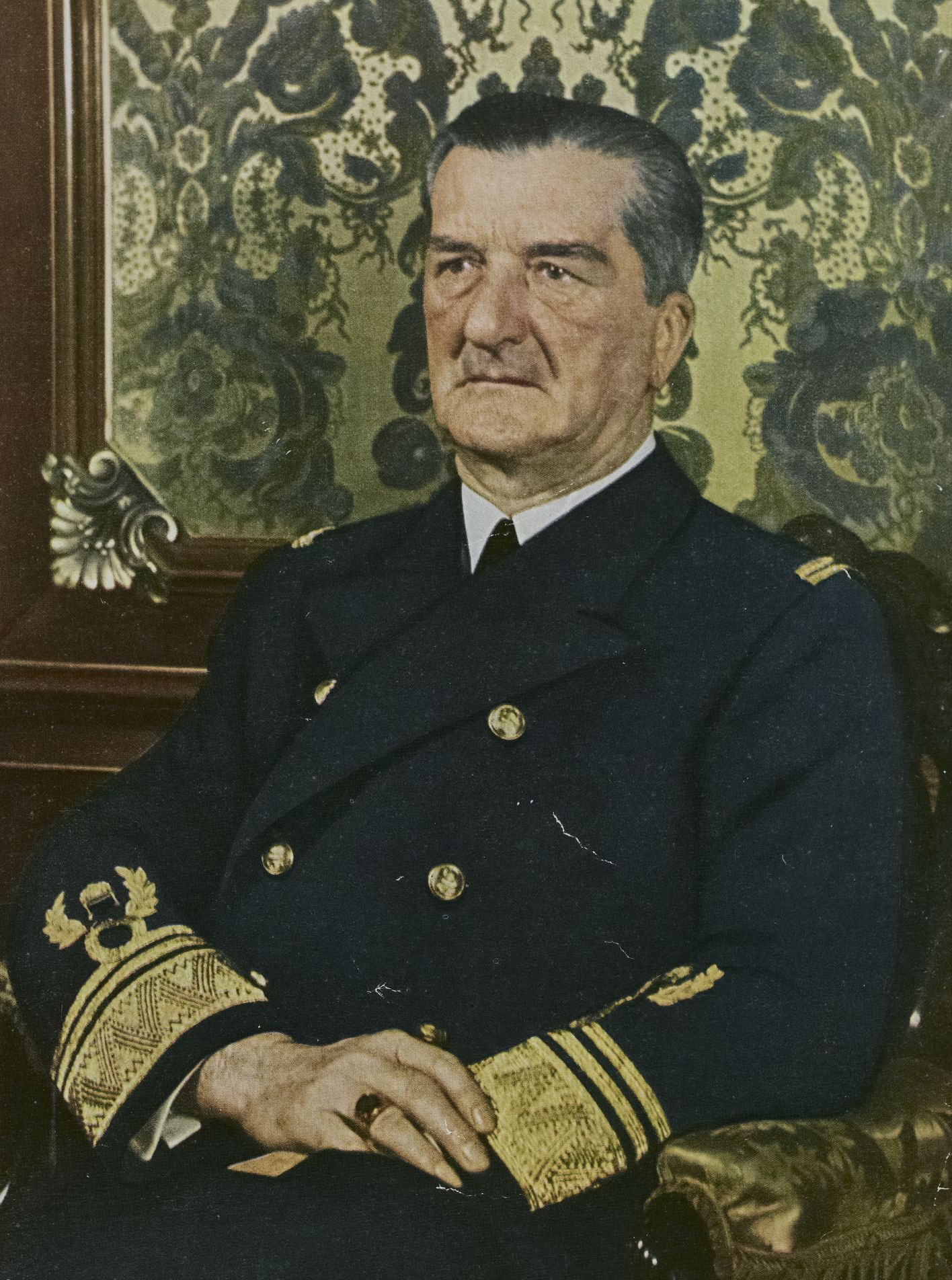
- Horthy regime 1 March 1920 – 16 October 1944
- Monarch: Vacant
- Premier: See list: Károly Huszár S. Simonyi-Semadam Pál Teleki István Bethlen Gyula Károlyi Gyula Gömbös Kálmán Darányi Béla Imrédy Pál Teleki F. Keresztes-Fischer (acting) László Bárdossy F. Keresztes-Fischer (acting) Miklós Kállay Döme Sztójay Géza Lakatos
- Party: Independent

A Message to America by Nicholas Horthy in 1929 (early sound film with English speech)

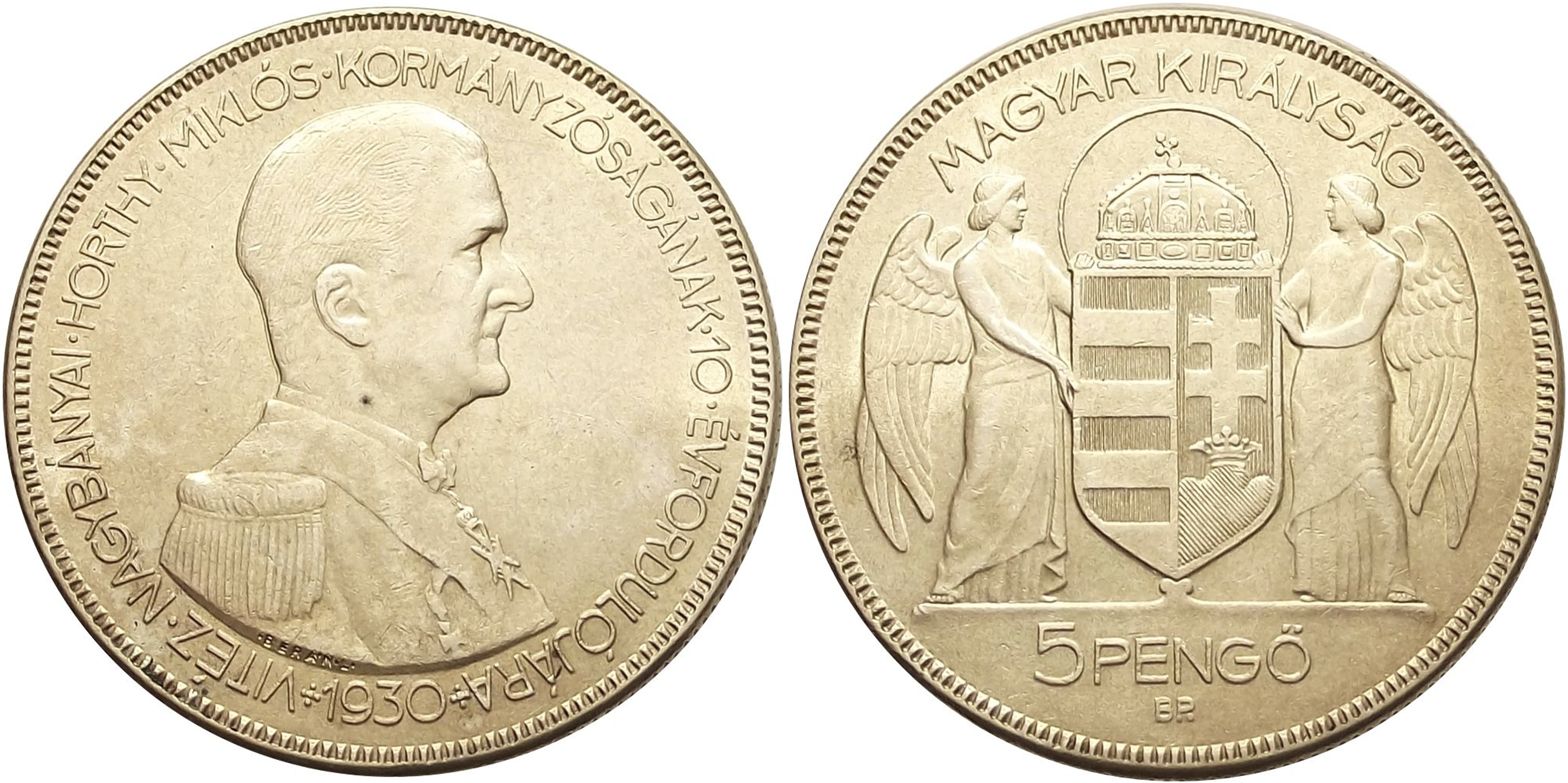
Silver coin: 5 Pengő - Miklós Horthy

On March 1, 1920, the National Assembly of Hungary re-established the Kingdom of Hungary. It was apparent that the Allies of World War I would not accept any return of King Charles IV (the former Austro-Hungarian emperor) from exile. Instead, with National Army officers controlling the parliament building, the assembly voted to install Horthy as Regent; he defeated Count Albert Apponyi by a vote of 131 to 7.

Bishop Ottokár Prohászka then led a small delegation to meet Horthy, announcing, "Hungary's Parliament has elected you Regent! Would it please you to accept the office of Regent of Hungary?" To their astonishment, Horthy declined, unless the powers of the office were expanded. As Horthy stalled, the politicians gave in to his demands and granted him "the general prerogatives of the king, with the exception of the right to name titles of nobility and of the patronage of the Church." The prerogatives he was given included the power to appoint and dismiss prime ministers, to convene and dissolve parliament, and to command the armed forces. With those sweeping powers guaranteed, Horthy took the oath of office. He was styled His Serene Highness the Regent of the Kingdom of Hungary (Hungarian: Ő Főméltósága a Magyar Királyság Kormányzója). In any case, the previous monarch, Charles I (Charles IV in Hungary) did try to regain his throne twice.

Standard of Miklós Horthy as Regent of Hungary

The Hungarian state was legally a kingdom, but it had no king, as the Allied powers would not have tolerated any reinstatement of the Habsburg dynasty. The country retained its parliamentary system following the dissolution of Austria-Hungary, with a prime minister appointed as head of government. As head of state, Horthy retained significant influence through his constitutional powers and the loyalty of his ministers to the crown. Although his involvement in drafting legislation was minuscule, he nevertheless had the ability to ensure that laws passed by the Hungarian parliament conformed to his political preferences.

==== Károlyi's attempts to remove Horthy ====
In 1920 the ex-president of the First Hungarian Republic, Count Mihály Károlyi began a vigorous propaganda campaign against the emerging Horthy government from his exile in France. Károlyi attempted to negotiate with the so-called "Little Entente" through Edvard Beneš who as the foreign minister of Czechoslovakia played a crucial role in establishing the Little Entente. Károlyi also reached out to the Austrian Social Democratic Chancellor, Karl Renner.

Count Károlyi wanted to achieve the disarmament of the Hungarian National Army and the removal of Horthy to such a degree that he even considered doing so through foreign intervention and force of arms. However, the attempt to remove Horthy had little impact: Renner and Beneš did send a memorandum to the Entente Powers, but their leaders had already decided that it would be best for Horthy to remain in power to serve as a stabilizing force after the signing of the Treaty of Trianon.

=== Seeking redress for the Treaty of Trianon ===
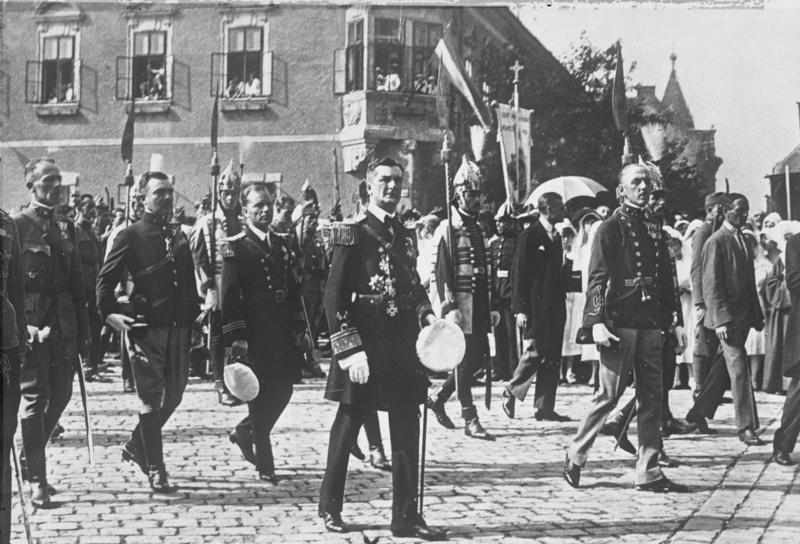
Horthy in Budapest, August 1931

Hungarian historian Ádám Magda wrote in her study Versailles System and Central Europe (2006): "Today we know that the bane of Central Europe was the Little Entente, military alliance of Czechoslovakia, Romania and the Kingdom of Serbs, Croats and Slovenes (later Yugoslavia), created in 1921 not for Central Europe's cooperation nor to fight German expansion, but in a wrongly perceived notion that a completely powerless Hungary must be kept down".

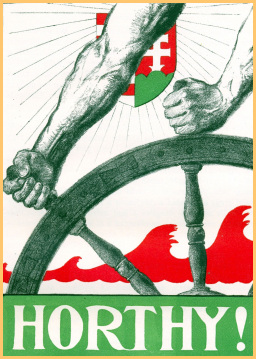
Horthy's propaganda poster around 1935

The first decade of Horthy's reign was primarily consumed by stabilizing the Hungarian economy and political system. Horthy's chief partner in these efforts was his prime minister István Bethlen. It was commonly known that Horthy was an Anglophile, and British political and economic support played a significant role in the stabilization and consolidation of the early Horthy era in the Kingdom of Hungary.

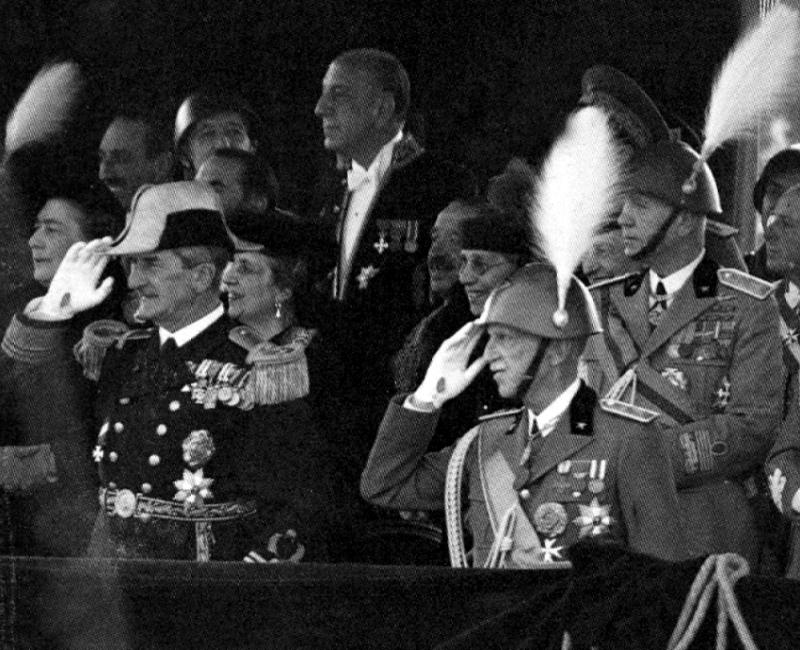
Miklós Horthy with King Victor Emmanuel III of Italy in Rome on 25 November 1936, during a military parade in Via dell'Impero

Bethlen sought to stabilize the economy while building alliances with weaker nations that could advance Hungary's cause. That cause was, primarily, reversing the losses of the Treaty of Trianon. The humiliations of the Trianon treaty continued to occupy a central place in Hungarian foreign policy and the popular imagination. The indignant anti-Trianon slogan "Nem, nem soha!" ("No, no never!") became a ubiquitous motto of Hungarian outrage. When in 1927 the British newspaper magnate Lord Rothermere denounced the partitions ratified at Trianon in the pages of his Daily Mail, an official letter of gratitude was eagerly signed by 1.2 million Hungarians.

But Hungary's stability was precarious, and the Great Depression derailed much of Bethlen's economic balance. Horthy replaced him with an old reactionary confederate from his Szeged days: Gyula Gömbös. Gömbös was an outspoken anti-Semite and a budding fascist. Although he agreed to Horthy's demands that he temper his anti-Jewish rhetoric and work amicably with Hungary's large Jewish professional class, Gömbös's tenure began swinging Hungary's political mood powerfully rightward. John Gunther stated that Horthy,

though reactionary as far as social or economic ideas are concerned, is in effect the guardian of constitutionalism and what vestigial democracy remains in the country, because it is largely his influence that prevents any prime minister from abolishing parliament and setting up a dictatorial rule.

Gömbös rescued the failing economy by securing trade guarantees from Germany – a strategy that positioned Germany as Hungary's primary trading partner and tied Hungary's future even more tightly to Hitler's. He also assured Hitler that Hungary would quickly become a one-party state modeled on the Nazi party control of Germany. Gömbös died in 1936 before he realized his most extreme goals, but he left his nation headed into a firm partnership with the German dictator.

== World War II and the Holocaust ==
=== Uneasy alliance ===
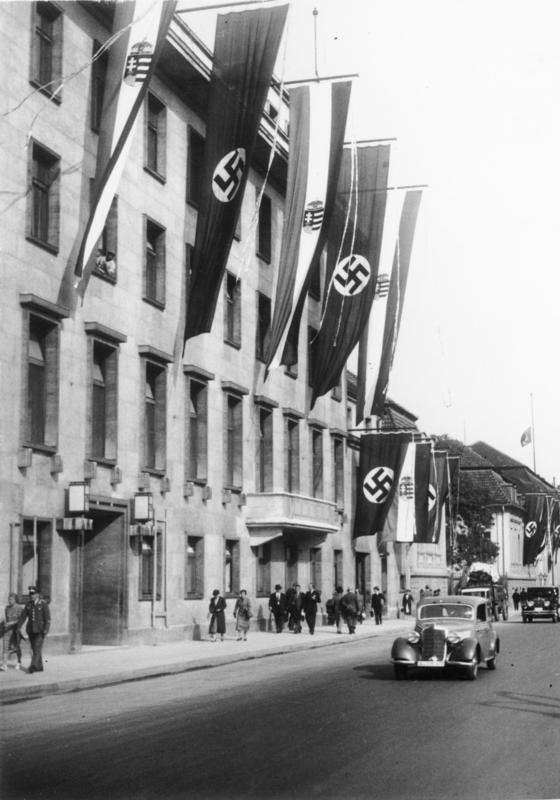
German and Hungarian flags in Berlin

Hungary now entered into intricate political maneuvers with the regime of Adolf Hitler, and Horthy began to play a greater and more public role in navigating Hungary along this dangerous path.

For Horthy, Hitler served as a bulwark against Soviet encroachment or invasion. Horthy was obsessed with the Communist threat. One American diplomat remarked that Horthy's anti-communist tirades were so common and ferocious that diplomats "discounted it as a phobia".

Horthy clearly saw his country as trapped between two stronger powers, both of them dangerous; evidently, he considered Hitler to be the more manageable of the two, at least at first. Hitler was able to wield greater influence over Hungary than the Soviet Union could—not only as the country's major trading partner but also because he could assist with two of Horthy's key ambitions: maintaining Hungarian sovereignty and satisfying the nationwide yearning to recover former Hungarian lands. Horthy's strategy was one of cautious, sometimes even grudging, alliances. The means by which the regent granted or resisted Hitler's demands, especially with regard to Hungarian military action and the treatment of Hungary's Jews, remain the central criteria by which his career has been judged. Horthy's relationship with Hitler was, by his own account, a tense one – largely due, he said, to his unwillingness to bend his nation's policies to the German leader's desires.

Horthy's attitude to Hitler was ambivalent. On one hand, Hungary was an irredentist state that refused to accept the frontiers imposed by the Treaty of Trianon. Furthermore, the three states with which Hungary had territorial disputes, namely Czechoslovakia, Yugoslavia, and Romania, were all allies of France, so a German-Hungarian alliance seemed logical. On the other hand, Admiral Horthy was a good navalist who believed that sea power was the most important factor in war. He felt that Britain, as the world's greatest sea power, would inevitably defeat Germany should another war begin. During a meeting with Hitler in 1935, Horthy was well pleased that Hitler informed him that he wanted Germany and Hungary to partition Czechoslovakia, but Horthy went on to tell Hitler that he must be careful not to do anything that might cause an Anglo-German war because British sea power would sooner or later cause the defeat of Nazi Germany. Horthy was always torn between his belief that an alliance with Germany was the only way to revise Trianon and his belief that war against the international order could only end in defeat.

In August 1938, when Horthy, his wife, and some Hungarian politicians took a special train from Budapest to Germany, SA and other National Socialist formations ceremonially welcomed the delegation at the Passau train station. The train then continued to Kiel for the christening of the German cruiser Prinz Eugen.

During his ensuing state visit, Hitler asked Horthy for troops and matériel to participate in Germany's planned invasion of Czechoslovakia. In exchange, Horthy later reported, "He gave me to understand that as a reward we should be allowed to keep the territory we had invaded." Horthy said he declined, insisting to Hitler that Hungary's claims on the disputed lands should be settled by peaceful means.

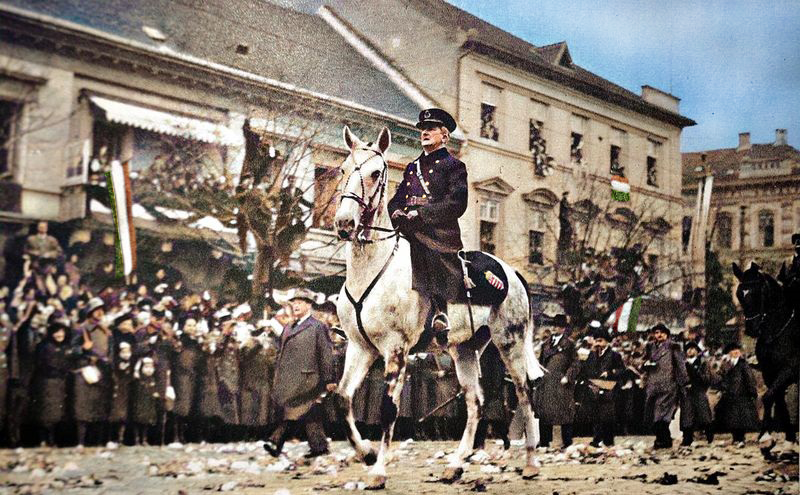
Horthy at the annexation of south-east Czechoslovakia, Kassa (present-day Košice), 11 November 1938

Three months later, after the Munich Agreement put control of Czechoslovakia's Sudetenland in Hitler's hands, by the First Vienna Award Hungary annexed some of the south-eastern parts of Czechoslovakia. Horthy enthusiastically rode into the re-acquired territories at the head of his troops, greeted by emotional ethnic Hungarians: "As I passed along the roads, people embraced one another, fell upon their knees, and wept with joy because liberation had come to them at last, without war, without bloodshed." But as "peaceful" as this annexation was, and as just as it may have seemed to a number of Hungarians, it was a dividend of Hitler's brinksmanship and threats of war, in which Hungary was now inextricably complicit. Hungary was now committed to the Axis agenda: on February 24, 1939, it joined the Anti-Comintern Pact, and on April 11, it withdrew from the League of Nations. American journalists began to refer to Hungary as "the jackal of Europe".

This combination of menace and reward drifted Hungary closer to the status of a Nazi client state. In March 1939, when Hitler took what remained of Czechoslovakia by force, Hungary was allowed to annex the Carpathian Ruthenia. After a conflict with the First Slovak Republic during the Slovak–Hungarian War of 1939, Hungary gained further territories. In August 1940, Hitler intervened on Hungary's behalf once again. After the failed Hungarian-Romanian negotiations, Hungary annexed Northern Transylvania from Romania by the Second Vienna Award.

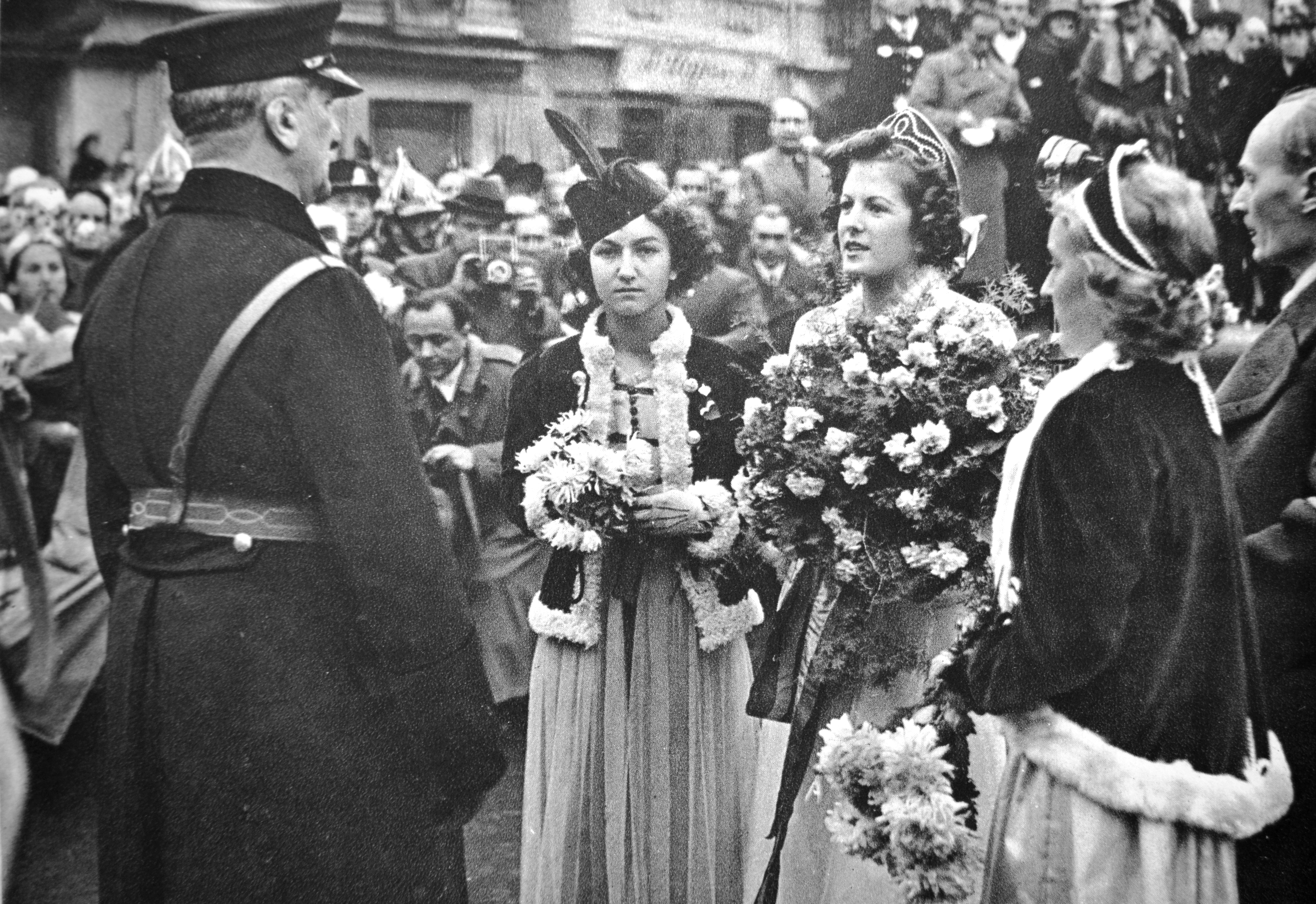
Horthy during the Hungarians' entry into Komárom (present-day Komárno), following the First Vienna Award, November 1938

But despite their cooperation with the Nazi regime, Horthy and his government would be better described as "conservative authoritarian" than "fascist". Certainly, Horthy was as hostile to the home-grown fascist and ultra-nationalist movements that emerged in Hungary between the wars (particularly the Arrow Cross Party) as he was to Communism. The Arrow Cross leader, Ferenc Szálasi, was repeatedly imprisoned at Horthy's command.

John F. Montgomery, who served in Budapest as U.S. ambassador from 1933 to 1941, openly admired this side of Horthy's character and reported the following incident in his memoir: in March 1939, Arrow Cross supporters disrupted a performance at the Budapest opera house by chanting "Justice for Szálasi!" loud enough for the regent to hear. A fight broke out, and when Montgomery went to take a closer look, he discovered that:

two or three men were on the floor and he [Horthy] had another by the throat, slapping his face and shouting what I learned afterward was: "So you would betray your country, would you?" The Regent was alone, but he had the situation in hand.... The whole incident was typical not only of the Regent's deep hatred of alien doctrine, but of the kind of man he is. Although he was around seventy-two years of age, it did not occur to him to ask for help; he went right ahead like a skipper with a mutiny on his hands.

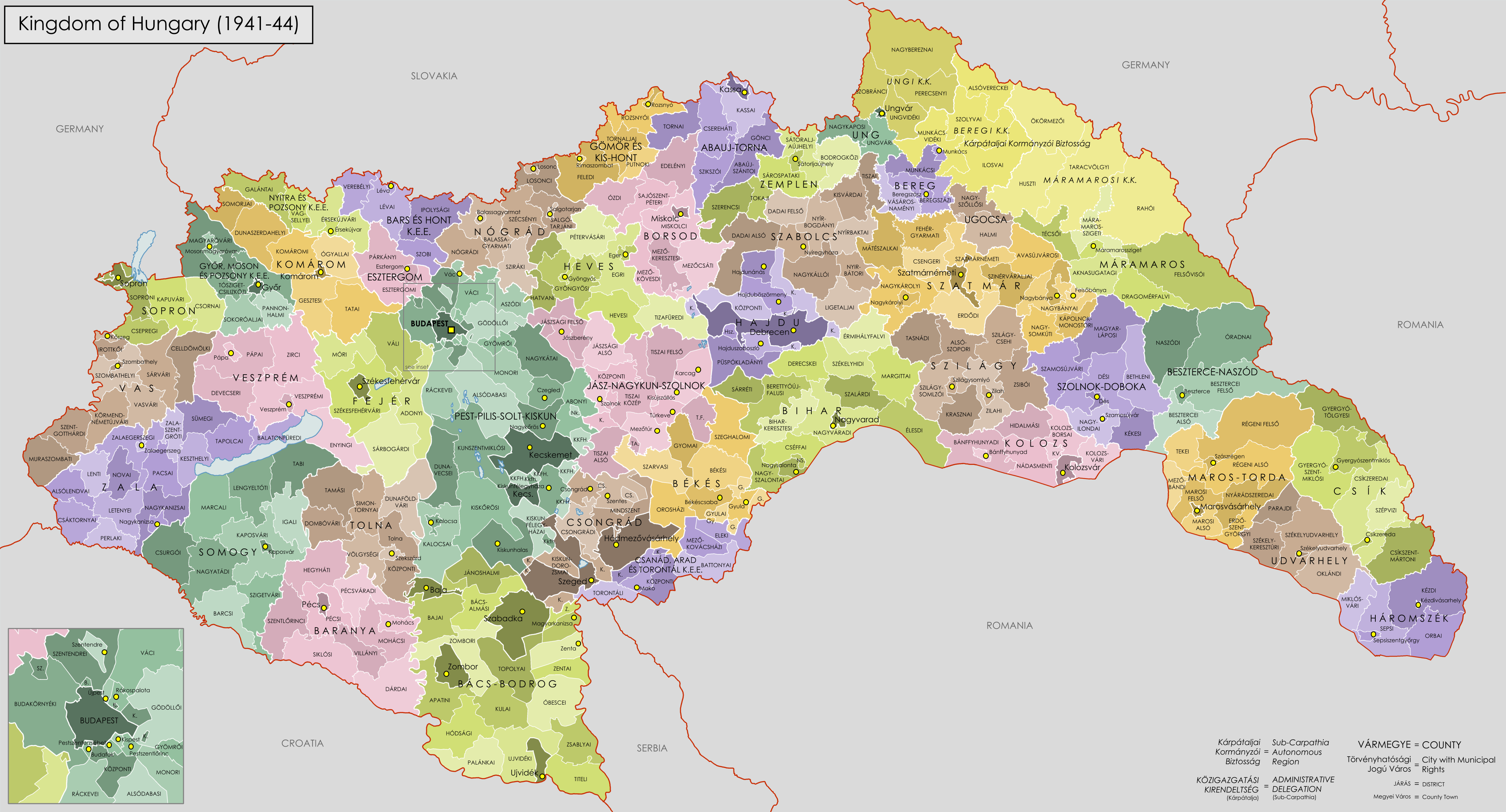
Hungary in 1941, after recovering territories from Czechoslovakia, Romania, and Yugoslavia

And yet, by the time of this episode, Horthy had allowed his government to give in to Nazi demands that the Hungarians enact laws restricting the lives of the country's Jews. The first Hungarian anti-Jewish Law, in 1938, limited the number of Jews in the professions, government, and commerce to twenty percent, and the second reduced it to five percent the following year; 250,000 Hungarian Jews lost their jobs as a result. A "Third Jewish Law" of August 1941 prohibited Jews from marrying non-Jews and defined anyone having two Jewish grandparents as "racially Jewish". A Jewish man who had non-marital sex with a "decent non-Jewish woman resident in Hungary" could be sentenced to three years in prison.

Horthy's personal views on Jews and their role in Hungarian society are the subject of some debate. In an October 1940 letter to Prime Minister Count Pál Teleki, Horthy echoed a widespread national sentiment: that Jews enjoyed too much success in commerce, the professions, and industry—success that needed to be curtailed:

As regards the Jewish problem, I have been an anti-Semite throughout my life. I have never had contact with Jews. I have considered it intolerable that here in Hungary everything, every factory, bank, large fortune, business, theatre, press, commerce, etc. should be in Jewish hands, and that the Jew should be the image reflected of Hungary, especially abroad. Since, however, one of the most important tasks of the government is to raise the standard of living, i.e., we have to acquire wealth, it is impossible, in a year or two, to replace the Jews, who have everything in their hands, and to replace them with incompetent, unworthy, mostly big-mouthed elements, for we should become bankrupt. This requires a generation at least.

=== War ===
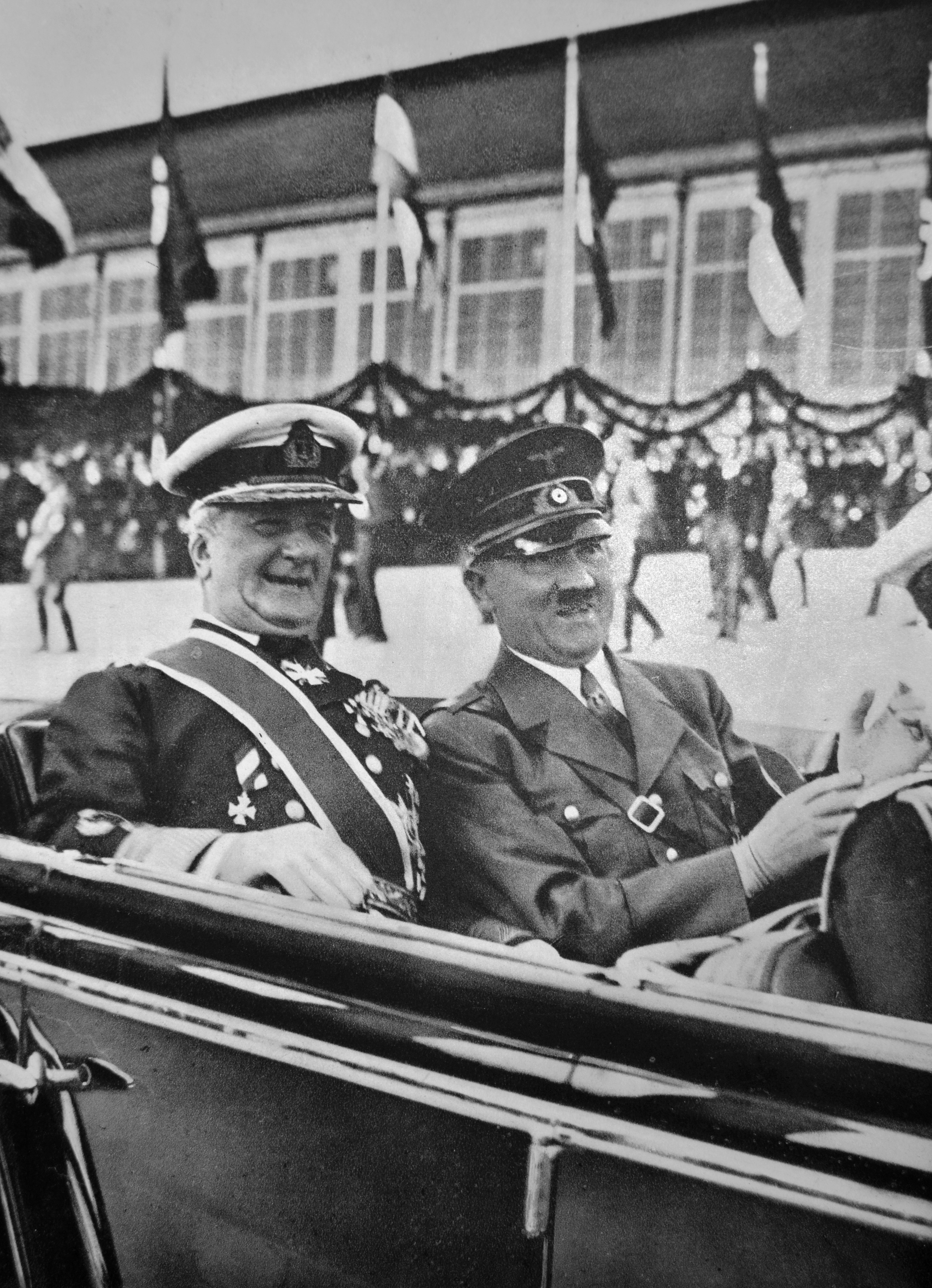
Horthy with Nazi leader Adolf Hitler in 1938

The Kingdom of Hungary was gradually drawn into the war itself. In 1939 and 1940, Hungarian volunteers were sent to Finland's Winter War, but did not have time to take part in the fighting before the end of the war. In April 1941, Hungary became, in effect, a member of the Axis. Hungary permitted Hitler to send troops across Hungarian territory for the invasion of Yugoslavia and ultimately sent its own troops to claim its share of the dismembered Kingdom of Yugoslavia. Prime Minister Pál Teleki, horrified that he had failed to prevent this collusion with the Nazis, despite the fact that he had signed a non-aggression pact with Yugoslavia in December 1940, committed suicide.

In June 1941, the Hungarian government finally yielded to Hitler's demands that the nation contribute to the Axis war effort. On June 27, Hungary became part of Operation Barbarossa and declared war on the Soviet Union. The Hungarians sent in troops and material only four days after Hitler began his invasion of the Soviet Union on June 22 June 1941.

Eighteen months later, less well-equipped and less motivated than their German allies, 200,000 troops of the Hungarian Second Army ended up holding the front on the Don River west of Stalingrad.

Hungary also declared war on the United States; the following is an excerpt from Galeazzo Ciano's diaries:

Hungarian uneasiness is expressed by this little story making the rounds in Budapest. The Minister of Hungary declares war on the United States, but the official who receives the communication is not very well informed on European matters and hence asks several questions.
He asks. ″Is Hungary a republic?′ ″No, it is a kingdom.′ ″Then you have a king?′ ″No, we have an admiral.″ ″Then you have a fleet?′ ″No, we do not have any sea.″ ″Do you have any claims then?′ ″Yes.″ ″Against America?′ ″No.″ ″Against England?′ ″No.″ ″Against Russia?′ ″No.″ ″But against whom do you have these claims?′ ″Against Romania.″ ″Then you will declare war on Romania?′ ″No sir. We are allies.″
There is a great deal of truth in this series of paradoxes.

— May 11, 1942

The first massacre of Jewish people from Hungarian territory took place in August 1941, when government officials ordered the deportation of Jews without Hungarian citizenship (principally refugees from other Nazi-occupied countries) to Ukraine. Roughly 18,000–20,000 of these deportees were slaughtered by Friedrich Jeckeln and his SS troops; only 2,000–3,000 survived. These killings are known as the Kamianets-Podilskyi Massacre. This event, in which the slaughter of Jews for the first time numbered in the tens of thousands, is considered to be among the first large-scale massacre of the Holocaust. Because of the objections of Hungary's leadership, the deportations were halted.

By early 1942, Horthy was already seeking to put some distance between himself and Hitler's regime. That March, he dismissed the pro-German prime minister László Bárdossy and replaced him with Miklós Kállay, a moderate whom Horthy expected to loosen Hungary's ties to Germany. Kállay successfully sabotaged economic cooperation with Nazi Germany, protected refugees and prisoners, resisted Nazi pressure regarding Jews, established contact with the Allies, and negotiated conditions under which Hungary would switch sides against Germany. However, the Allies were not close enough. When the Germans occupied Hungary in March 1944, Kállay went into hiding. He was finally captured by the Nazis, but was liberated when the war ended. In 1944 Horthy secretly instructed Géza Lakatos (prime minister of Hungary) to remove far-right officials from government.

In September 1942, personal tragedy struck the Hungarian Regent. 37-year-old István Horthy, Horthy's eldest son, was killed. István Horthy was the Deputy Regent of Hungary and a Flight Lieutenant in the reserves, 1/1 Fighter Squadron of the Royal Hungarian Air Force. He was killed when his Hawk (Héja) fighter crashed at an air field near Ilovskoye.

In January 1943, Hungary's enthusiasm for the war effort, never especially high, suffered a tremendous blow. The Soviet army, in the full momentum of its triumphant turnaround after the Battle of Stalingrad, punched through Romanian troops at a bend in the Don River and virtually obliterated the Second Hungarian Army in a few days' fighting. In this single action, Hungarian combat fatalities jumped by 80,000. Jew and non-Jew suffered together in this defeat, as the Hungarian troops had been accompanied by some 40,000 Jews and political prisoners in forced-labor units whose job had been to clear minefields.

German officials blamed Hungary's Jews for the nation's "defeatist attitude." In the wake of the Don bend disaster, Hitler demanded at an April 1943 meeting that Horthy punish the 800,000 Jews still living in Hungary, who according to Hitler were responsible for this defeat. In response, Horthy and his government-supplied 10,000 Jewish deportees for labor battalions. With the growing awareness the Allies might well win the war, it became more expedient not to comply with further German requests. Cautiously, the Hungarian government began to explore contacts with the Allies in hopes of negotiating a surrender. In late 1943, as the military situation deteriorated for the Axis powers, circles around Regent Horthy sought backchannel negotiations to exit the war. On 18 December 1943, Prince György Ghika, the last Hungarian minister to the Washington before Hungary's declaration of war, acted as an intermediary in Bern, Switzerland, delivering a confidential communication from Miklós Horthy Jr. regarding Hungary's potential armistice and capitulation to the Western Allies. In Bern, Ghika verbally conveyed to Allied representatives that the Hungarian leadership was awaiting an operational signal from the Western Allies before acting.

Prior to the German occupation within the area of Hungary around 63,000 Jews perished. Overall, Hungarian Jews suffered close to 560,000 casualties. Yet Horthy himself gained knowledge of the situation of the Jews in Auschwitz in 1944 when one of the family's friends, Pető Ernő, one of the leaders of the Central Jewish Council revealed the truth about the deportations. A personal friend of Horthy, Count Bethlen István also urged the Replacement of Sztójay-administration and the abolition of deportation. He called the deportation "inhuman, stupid and unworthy of the Hungarian character with which the present government has sullied the Hungarian name in the eyes of the world." The law against deportations was passed on June 26.

=== Occupation ===
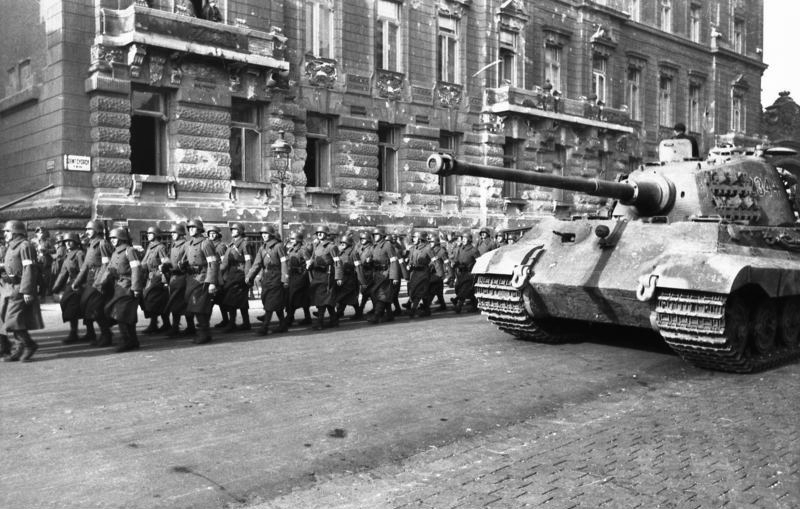
A German Tiger II with a column of Arrow Cross soldiers in war-torn Budapest in October 1944

By 1944, the Axis was losing the war, and the Red Army was at Hungary's borders. Fearing that the Soviets would overrun the country, Kállay, with Horthy's approval, put out numerous feelers to the Allies. He even promised to surrender unconditionally to them once they reached Hungarian territory. An enraged Hitler summoned Horthy to a conference in Klessheim Castle near Salzburg. He pressured Horthy to make greater contributions to the war effort and again commanded him to assist in the killing of more of Hungary's Jews. Horthy now permitted the deportation of a large number of Jews (the generally accepted figure is 100,000), but would not go further.

The conference was a ruse. As Horthy was returning home on 19 March, the Wehrmacht invaded and occupied Hungary. Horthy was told he could only stay in office if he dismissed Kállay and appointed a new government that would fully cooperate with Hitler and his plenipotentiary in Budapest, Edmund Veesenmayer. Knowing the likely alternative was a gauleiter who would treat Hungary in the same manner as the other countries under Nazi occupation, Horthy acquiesced and appointed his ambassador to Germany, General Döme Sztójay, as prime minister. The Germans originally wanted Horthy to reappoint Béla Imrédy (who had been prime minister from 1938 to 1939), but Horthy had enough influence to get Veesenmayer to accept Sztójay instead. Contrary to Horthy's hopes, Sztójay's government eagerly proceeded to participate in the Holocaust.

The chief agents of this collaboration were Andor Jaross, the Minister of the Interior, and his two rabidly anti-Semitic state secretaries, László Endre and László Baky (later to be known as the "Deportation Trio"). On 9 April, Prime Minister Sztójay and the Germans obligated Hungary to place 300,000 Jewish people at the "disposal" of the Reich, in effect, sentencing most of Hungary's remaining Jews to death. Five days later, on 14 April, Endre, Baky, and SS Lieutenant-Colonel Adolf Eichmann commenced the deportation of the remaining Hungarian Jews. The Yellow Star, Ghettoization laws and deportation were accomplished in less than 8 weeks with the help of the new Hungarian government and authorities. The deportation of Hungarian Jews to Auschwitz began on 14 May 1944 and continued at a rate of 12–14,000 a day until 24 July.

Upon learning about the deportations, Horthy wrote the following letter to the prime minister:

Dear Sztójay: I was aware that the Government in the given forced situation has to take many steps that I do not consider correct, and for which I can not take responsibility. Among these matters is the handling of the Jewish question in a manner that does not correspond to the Hungarian mentality, Hungarian conditions, and, for the matter, Hungarian interests. It is clear to everyone that what among these were done by Germans or by the insistence of the Germans was not in my power to prevent, so in these matters, I was forced into passivity. As such, I was not informed in advance, or I am not fully informed now, however, I have heard recently that in many cases in inhumaneness and brutality we exceeded the Germans. I demand that the handling of the Jewish affairs in the Ministry of Interior be taken out of the hands of Deputy Minister László Endre. Furthermore, László Baky's assignment to the management of the police forces should be terminated as soon as possible.

Just before the deportations began, two Slovak Jewish prisoners, Rudolf Vrba and Alfréd Wetzler, escaped from Auschwitz and passed details of what was happening inside the camps to officials in Slovakia. This document, known as the Vrba-Wetzler Report, was quickly translated into German and passed among Jewish groups and then to Allied officials. Details from the report were broadcast by the BBC on 15 June and printed in The New York Times on 20 June. World leaders, including Pope Pius XII (25 June), President Franklin D. Roosevelt on 26 June, and King Gustaf V of Sweden on 30 June, subsequently pleaded with Horthy to use his influence to stop the deportations. Roosevelt specifically threatened military retaliation if the transports were not ceased. On 2 July 1944 Horthy put down a coup attempt by Hungarists by using loyal forces. Thereby he temporarily neutralized the men who planned to deport Jews. This enabled Horthy to issue the order halting deportations on 7 July. The transports halted. By that time, 437,000 Jews had been sent to Auschwitz on 147 trains, most of them to their deaths. Horthy was informed about the number of the deported Jews some days later: "approximately 400,000". Rudolf Hoss, the commander of Auschwitz, begged the Hungarian authorities not to send more than one transport every other day, as the camp crematoria did not have the capacity to cope with the sheer number of bodies arriving from the gas chambers.

By multiple estimates, one of every three people murdered at Auschwitz during its operation was a Hungarian Jew killed between May and July 1944.

There remains some uncertainty over how much Horthy knew about the number of Hungarian Jews being deported, their destination, and their intended fate – and when he knew it as well as what he could have done about it. According to historian Péter Sipos, the Hungarian government had already known about the Jewish genocide since 1943. Some historians have argued that Horthy believed that the Jews were being sent to the camps to work and that they would be returned to Hungary after the war. Horthy himself wrote in his memoirs: "Not before August," he wrote, "did secret information reach me of the horrible truth about the extermination camps." The Vrba-Wetzler statement is believed to have been passed to Hungarian Zionist leader Rudolf Kastner no later than 28 April 1944, Kastner did not make it public. He made an agreement with the SS to remain silent in order to save the Jews who escaped on the Kastner train. The "Kastner train", a convoy that enabled Hungarian Jews to escape to Switzerland, left Budapest on 30 June 1944.

=== Deposition and arrest ===
In August 1944, Romania withdrew from the Axis and turned against Germany and its allies. This development, a sign of the failing German war effort, led Horthy in Budapest to reconsolidate his political position. He ousted Sztójay and the other Nazi-friendly ministers installed the preceding spring, replacing them with a new government under Géza Lakatos. He stopped the mass deportations of Jews and ordered the police to use deadly force if the Germans attempted to resume them. While some smaller groups continued to be deported by train, the Germans did not press Horthy to ramp the pace back up to pre-August levels. When Horthy turned down Eichmann's request to restart the deportations, Heinrich Himmler ordered Eichmann to return to Germany.

Realizing that Hungary's position was untenable, Horthy also renewed peace feelers to the Allies and began considering strategies for surrendering to the Allied force he distrusted the most: the Red Army. Although Horthy was still bitterly anticommunist, his dealings with the Nazis led him to conclude that the Soviets were the lesser evil. Working through his trustworthy General Béla Miklós, who was in contact with Soviet forces in eastern Hungary, Horthy sought to surrender to the Soviets while preserving the Hungarian government's autonomy. The Soviets willingly promised this, and on 11 October Horthy and the Soviets finally agreed to surrender terms. On 15 October 1944, Horthy told his government ministers that Hungary had signed an armistice with the Soviet Union. He said,

"It is clear today that Germany has lost the war... Hungary has accordingly concluded a preliminary armistice with Russia, and will cease all hostilities against her."

Horthy informed a representative of the German Reich that "we were about to conclude a military armistice with our former enemies and to cease all hostilities against them."

The Nazis had anticipated Horthy's move. On 15 October, after Horthy announced the armistice in a nationwide radio address, Hitler initiated Operation Panzerfaust, sending commando Otto Skorzeny to Budapest with instructions to remove Horthy from power. Horthy's son Miklós Horthy Jr. was meeting with Soviet representatives to finalize the surrender when Skorzeny and his troops forced their way into the meeting and kidnapped the younger Horthy at gunpoint. Trussed up in a carpet, Miklós Jr. was immediately driven to the airport and flown to Germany to serve as a hostage. Skorzeny then brazenly led a convoy of German troops and four Tiger II tanks to the Vienna Gates of Castle Hill, where the Hungarians had been ordered not to resist. Though one unit had not received the order, the Germans quickly captured Castle Hill with minimal bloodshed; seven soldiers were killed and twenty-six wounded.

Horthy was captured by Veesenmayer and his staff later on the 15th and taken to the Waffen SS office, where he was held overnight. Veesenmayer told Horthy that unless he recanted the armistice and abdicated, his son would be killed the next morning. The fascist Arrow Cross Party swiftly took over Budapest. With his son's life in the balance, Horthy consented to sign a document officially abdicating his office and naming Ferenc Szálasi, leader of the Arrow Cross, as both head of state and prime minister. Horthy understood that the Germans merely wanted the stamp of his prestige on a Nazi-sponsored Arrow Cross coup, but he signed anyway. As he later explained his capitulation:

"I neither resigned nor appointed Szálasi Premier. I merely exchanged my signature for my son's life. A signature wrung from a man at machine-gun point can have little legality."

Horthy met Skorzeny three days later at Pfeffer-Wildenbruch's apartment and was told he would be transported to Germany in his own special train. Skorzeny told Horthy that he would be a "guest of honour" in a secure Bavarian castle. On 17 October, Horthy was personally escorted by Skorzeny into captivity at Schloss Hirschberg am Haarsee in Bavaria, where he was guarded closely, but allowed to live in comfort.

With the help of the SS, the Arrow Cross leadership moved swiftly to take command of the Hungarian armed forces, and to prevent the surrender that Horthy had arranged, even though Soviet troops were now deep inside the country. Szálasi resumed persecution of Jews and other "undesirables". In the three months between November 1944 and January 1945, Arrow Cross death squads shot 10,000 to 15,000 Jews on the banks of the Danube. The Arrow Cross also welcomed Adolf Eichmann back to Budapest, where he began the deportation of the city's surviving Jews. Eichmann never successfully completed this phase of his plans, thwarted in large measure by the efforts of Swedish diplomat Raoul Wallenberg. Out of a pre-war Hungarian Jewish population estimated at 825,000, only 260,000 survived.

By December 1944, Budapest was under siege by Soviet forces. The Arrow Cross leadership retreated across the Danube into the hills of Buda in late January, and by February the city surrendered to the Soviet forces.

Horthy remained under house arrest in Bavaria until the war in Europe ended. On 29 April, his SS guardians fled in the face of the Allied advance. On 1 May, Horthy was first liberated, and then arrested, by elements of the U.S. 7th Army.

== Exile ==
After his arrest, Horthy was moved through a variety of detention locations before finally arriving at the prison facility at Nuremberg in late September 1945. There he was asked to provide evidence to the International Military Tribunal in preparation for the trial of the Nazi leadership. Although he was interviewed repeatedly about his contacts with some of the defendants, he did not testify in person. In Nuremberg, he was reunited with his son, Miklós Jr.

Horthy gradually came to believe that his arrest had been arranged and choreographed by the United States in order to protect him from the Russians. Indeed, the former regent reported being told that Josip Broz Tito, the new ruler of Yugoslavia, asked that Horthy be charged with complicity with the 1942 Novi Sad raid by Hungarian troops in the Bačka region of Vojvodina. Serbian historian Zvonimir Golubović has claimed that not only was Horthy aware of these genocidal massacres but had approved of them. American trial officials did not indict Horthy for war crimes. The former ambassador John Montgomery, who had some influence in Washington, also contributed to Horthy's release in Nuremberg.

According to the memoirs of Ferenc Nagy, who served for a year as prime minister in post-war Hungary, the Hungarian Communist leadership was also interested in extraditing Horthy for trial. Nagy said that Joseph Stalin was more forgiving: that Stalin told Nagy during a diplomatic meeting in April 1945 not to judge Horthy, because he was old and had offered an armistice in 1944. (Note: Nagy's 1948 memoirs, The Struggle Behind the Iron Curtain, are quoted in Andrew Simon's annotations to Horthy's Memoirs, in this case for Chapter 22)

On 17 December 1945, Horthy was released from Nuremberg Prison and allowed to rejoin his family in the German town of Weilheim, Bavaria. The Horthys lived there for four years, supported financially by ambassador John Montgomery, his successor, Herbert Pell, and by Pope Pius XII, whom he knew personally.

In March 1948, Horthy returned to testify at the Ministries Trial, the last of the twelve U.S.-run Nuremberg Trials; he testified against Edmund Veesenmayer, the Nazi administrator who had controlled Hungary during the deportations to Auschwitz in the spring of 1944. Veesenmayer was sentenced to 20 years imprisonment but was released in 1951.

For Horthy, returning to Hungary was impossible; it was now firmly in the hands of a Soviet-sponsored Communist government. In an extraordinary twist of fate, the chief of Hungary's post-war Communist apparatus was Mátyás Rákosi, one of Béla Kun's colleagues from the ill-fated Communist coup of 1919. Kun had been executed during Stalin's purges of the late 1930s, but Rákosi had survived in a Hungarian prison cell. In 1940, Horthy had permitted Rákosi to emigrate to the Soviet Union in exchange for a series of highly symbolic Hungarian battle-flags from the 19th century that were in Russian hands.

In 1950, the Horthy family managed to find a home in Portugal, thanks to Miklós Jr.'s contacts with Portuguese diplomats in Switzerland. Horthy and members of his family were relocated to the seaside town of Estoril. His American supporter, John Montgomery, recruited a small group of wealthy Hungarians to raise funds for their upkeep in exile. According to Horthy's daughter-in-law, Countess Ilona Edelsheim-Gyulai, Hungarian Jews also supported Horthy's family in exile, including industrialist Ferenc Chorin and lawyer László Pathy.

In exile, Horthy wrote his memoirs, Ein Leben für Ungarn (English: A Life for Hungary), published under the name of Nikolaus von Horthy, in which he narrated multiple personal experiences from his youth until the end of World War II. He claimed that he had mistrusted Hitler for much of the time he knew him and tried to perform the best actions and appoint the best officials in his country. He also highlighted Hungary's mistreatment by multiple other countries since the end of World War I. Horthy was one of the few Axis heads of state to survive the war, and thus to write post-war memoirs.

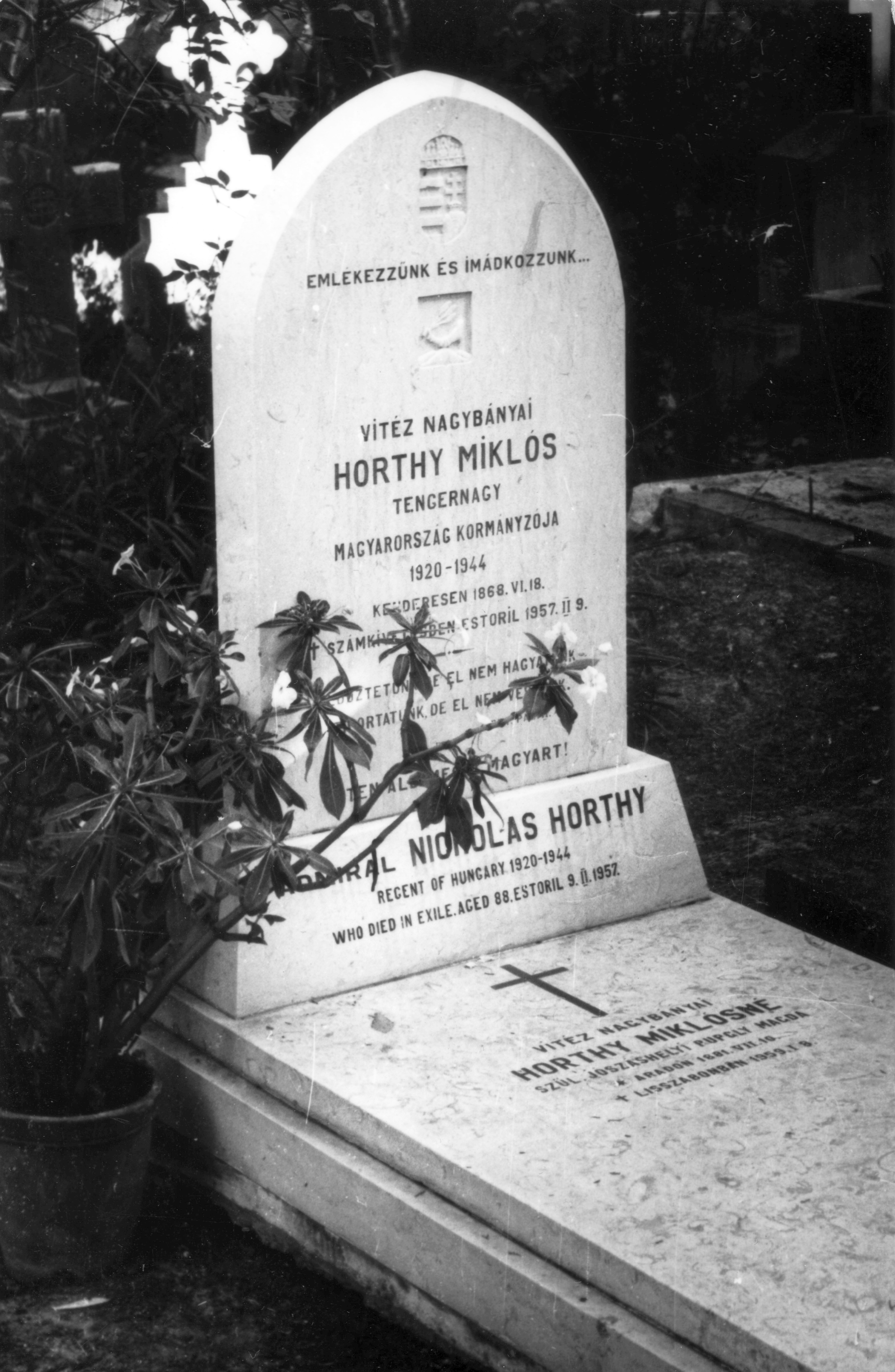
Horthy's original grave in British Cemetery, Lisbon, where Horthy was buried from 1957 to 1993.

Horthy never lost his deep contempt for communism, and in his memoirs he blamed Hungary's alliance with the Axis on the threat posed by the "Asiatic barbarians" of the Soviet Union. He railed against the influence that the Allies' victory had given to Stalin's totalitarian state. "I feel no urge to say 'I told you so,'" Horthy wrote, "nor to express bitterness at the experiences that have been forced upon me. Rather, I feel wonder and amazement at the vagaries of humanity."

Horthy married Magdolna Purgly de Jószáshely in 1901; they were married for just over 56 years, until his death. He had two sons, Miklós Horthy Jr. (often rendered in English as "Nicholas" or "Nikolaus") and István Horthy, who served as his political assistants; and two daughters, Magda and Paula. Of his four children, only Miklós outlived him.

He died in 1957 in Estoril and was initially buried in the British Cemetery, Lisbon. According to footnotes in his memoirs, Horthy was distraught about the failure of the Hungarian Revolution of 1956. In his will, Horthy asked that his body not be returned to Hungary "until the last Russian soldier has left." His heirs honored the request. In 1993, two years after the Soviet troops left Hungary, Horthy's body was returned to Hungary and he was buried in his hometown of Kenderes. The reburial in Hungary was the subject of some controversy on the part of the left.

== Legacy ==
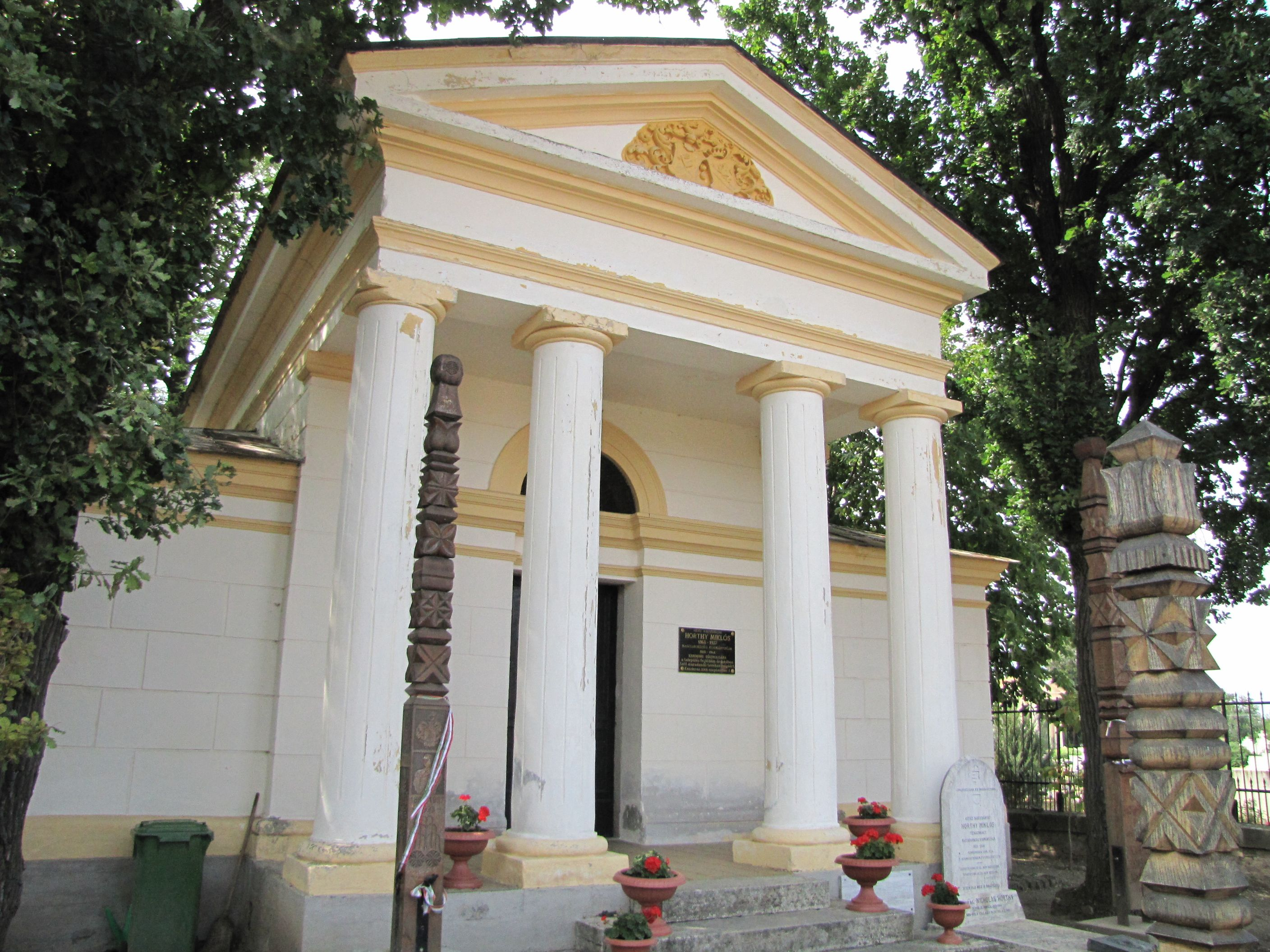
The Horthy family crypt in Kenderes, where Horthy himself was reburied in 1993

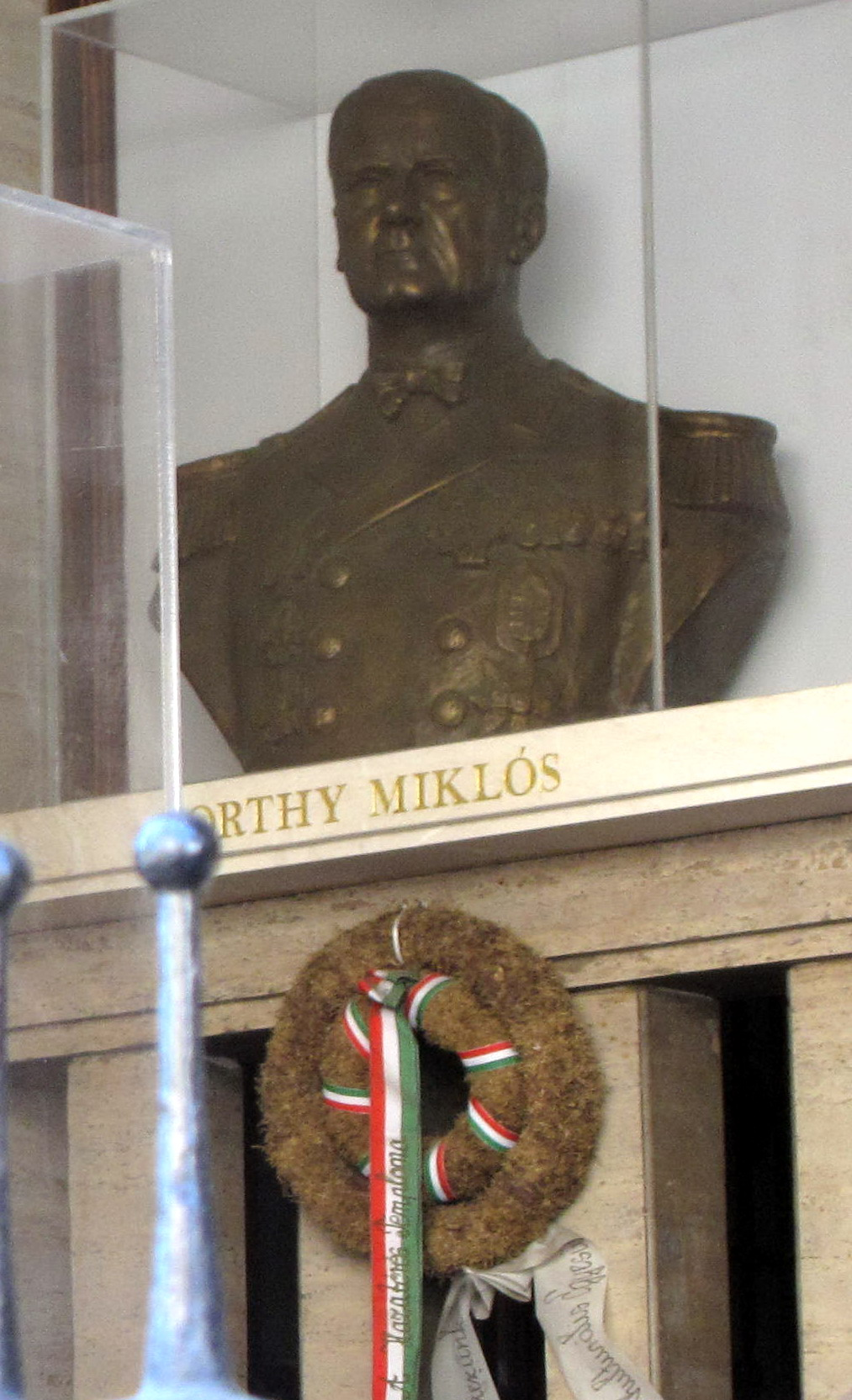
In 2013, the unveiling of Horthy's bust in a Calvinist Church in Budapest was followed by national and international criticisms.

The interwar period dominated by Horthy's government is known in Hungarian as the Horthy-kor ("Horthy age") or Horthy-rendszer ("Horthy system"). Its legacy, and that of Horthy himself, remain among the most controversial political topics in Hungary today, tied inseparably to the Treaty of Trianon and the Holocaust. According to one school of thought, Horthy was a strong, conservative, but not totalitarian leader who only entered into an alliance with Hitler's Germany in order to restore lands Hungary lost after the First World War and was reluctant, or even defiant, in the face of Germany's demands to deport the Hungarian Jewry. Others see Horthy's alliance with Germany as foolhardy, or think that a positive view of Horthy serves a revisionist historical agenda, pointing to Horthy's passage of various anti-Jewish laws – the earliest in Europe, in 1920 – as a sign of his anti-Semitism and the prelude for Hungary's collaboration in the Holocaust.

=== During the Horthy era ===
During his own reign, Horthy's reception was fairly positive, though by no means monolithic. Opponents of the short-lived Soviet Republic saw him as a "national saviour", in contrast to the Communist "losers of the nation". Because Horthy distanced himself from everyday politics, he was able to cultivate the image of the nationally governing admiral. The peaceful re-acquisition of Hungarian-majority lands lost after Trianon greatly bolstered this image. The regime's efforts at economic development and modernization also improved contemporaries' opinions, and although the Great Depression initially hurt his image, Horthy's wide-ranging social programs saved face for the most part.

On the other hand, Horthy's right-wing tendencies were not without their critics even in his time. Bourgeois liberals, among them Sándor Márai, criticized Horthy's authoritarian style as much as they disdained the violent tendencies of the far-left. He was also criticized by monarchists and elements of the aristocracy and clergy. While the harshest opposition to Horthy initially came from the Communist parties he had overthrown and outlawed, the later 1930s saw him come under increasing criticism from the far-right. After the Arrow Cross Party took control of the country in 1944, Horthy was denounced as a "traitor" and "Jew-lover".

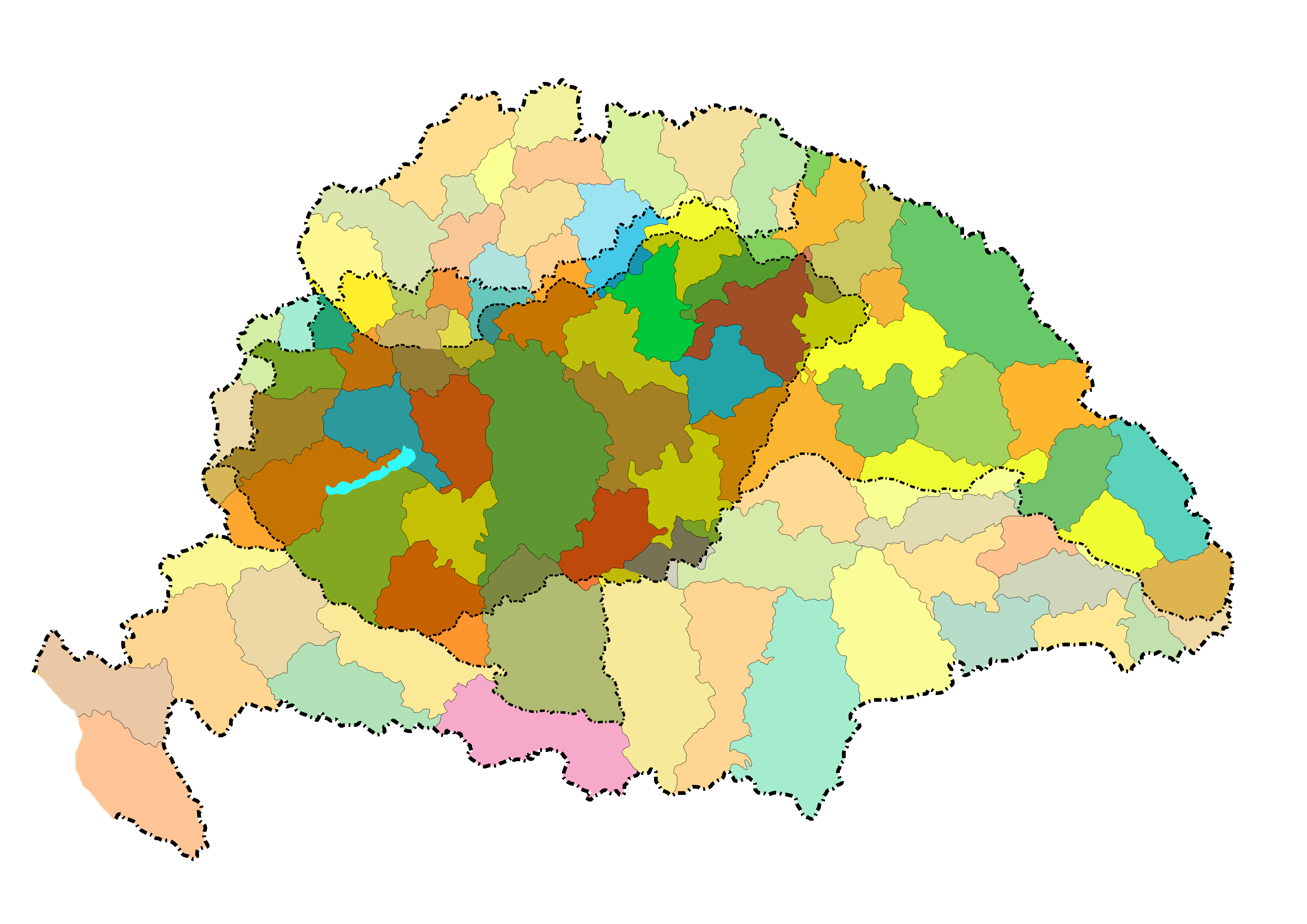
Hungary's borders (in increasing color) in 1920, 1938, 1940 and 1941

Horthy's reception in the West was positive until the outbreak of the Second World War, and while Hitler initially backed Horthy, relations between the two leaders were soured by Horthy's denial of involvement in the invasion of Poland and Czechoslovakia. Horthy likewise viewed the Nazis as "brigands and clowns." The Little Entente criticized Horthy, mainly for his irredentist policy goals.

=== During the Communist era ===
Mátyás Rákosi's hardline Stalinist government systematically disseminated, through propaganda and state education, the idea that the Horthy era constituted the "lowest point in Hungarian history." These views were supported by socialist or communist activists persecuted under the Horthy administration. Especially critical in this campaign was the 1950 publication of the textbook The Story of the Hungarian People, which denounced Horthy's military as a "genocidal band" consisting of "sociopathic officers, kulaks, and the dregs of society." It further characterized Horthy himself as a "slave of the Habsburgs", a "red-handed dictator" who "spoke broken Hungarian" and was known for his "hatred of workers and soviets." The Story of the Hungarian People was required reading in middle schools throughout the 1950s.

The Kádár era's relative liberalization, coupled with the concomitant professionalization of Hungarian history and historiography, allowed for more objective historical assessments of Horthy's career. Popular volumes still painted him negatively, openly leveling ad hominem attacks: Horthy was accused of bastardy, lechery, sadism, greed, nepotism, bloodthirst, warmongering, and cowardice, among other vices. Academic evaluations became more nuanced, however. Péter Gosztony's 1973 biography, for example, portrayed Horthy as a conscientious, traditional conservative. Gosztony argued that Horthy did not seek a dictatorship until the 1930s and, although he was unable to prevent the German invasion of Yugoslavia, sought to maintain a moderately liberal government, citing his replacement of hardliner László Bárdossy with Miklós Kállay as prime minister as evidence of this. Thomas Sakmyster was also sympathetic while acknowledging Horthy's "narrow-mindedness." Contemporary Hungarian-American historian István Deák regards Horthy as typical of other strongmen of the era, especially dictators Francisco Franco of Spain and Philippe Pétain of Vichy France. Deák writes that during the war, Horthy

alternatively promoted and opposed German influence in his country, depending on how he judged the probable outcome of the war... Similarly, Horthy both persecuted and protected his Jewish subjects, depending on the turn of military events and the social status and degree of assimilation of the Jews under his reign. In the end, he was neither tried nor imprisoned but at the urging of Stalin was allowed to go into exile in Portugal.

Many of Horthy's descendants who worked and were associated with the communist government generally referred to him in a negative light with the most prominent of them being the Anđelković family, a Yugoslav-Hungarian branch of Horthy's family that fought against the Hungarian occupation of Vojvodina.

=== Reburial and contemporary politics ===
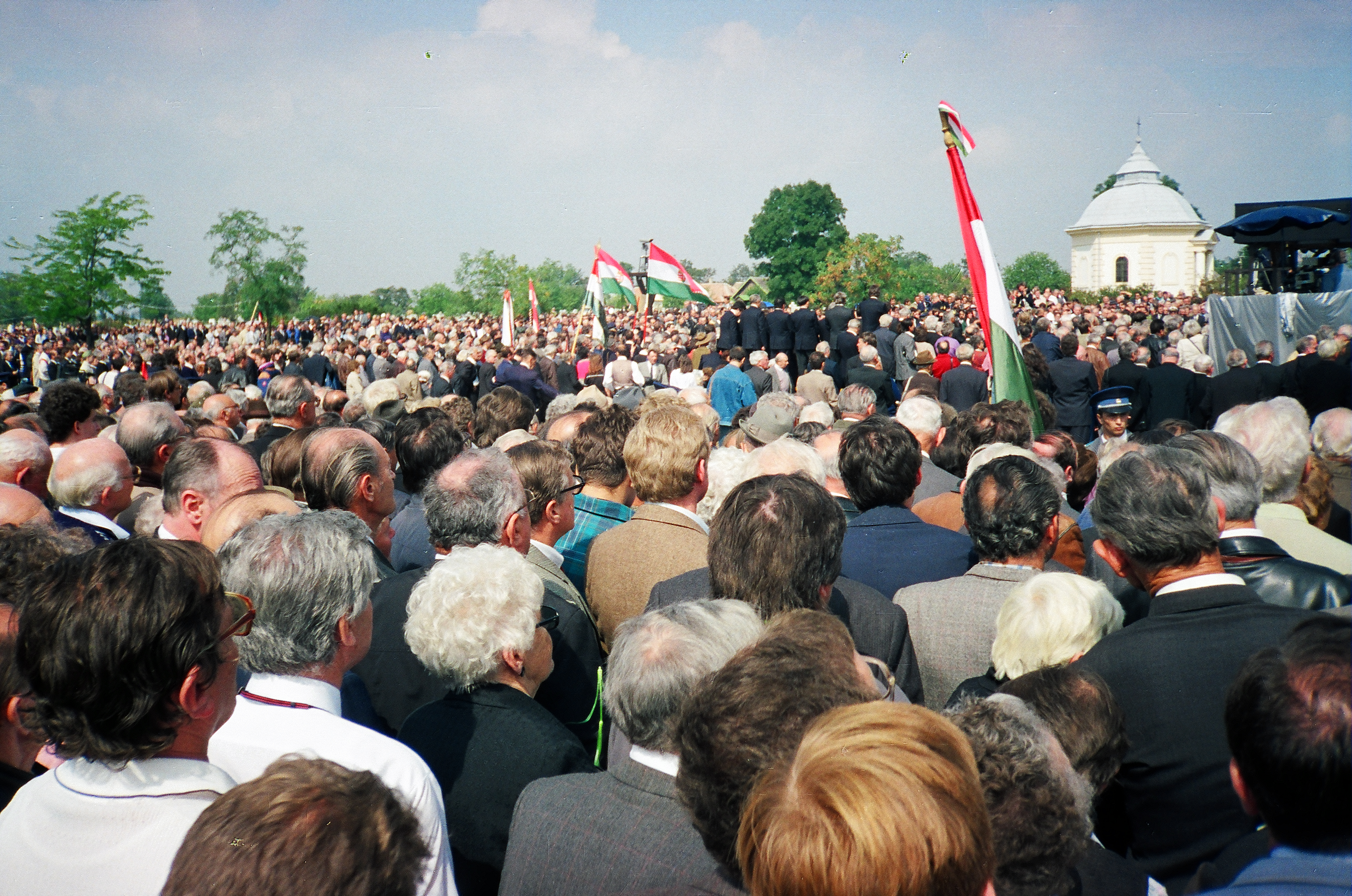
Horthy's 4 September 1993 reburial in Kenderes. The government's open support of the ceremony incited protests and international attention

The transition to a Western-style democracy allowed the privatization of media, which led to a shift in how Horthy was viewed in Hungary. In 1993, only a few years after the first democratic elections, Horthy's body was returned from Portugal to his hometown of Kenderes. Tens of thousands of people, as well as almost the entirety of József Antall's MDF cabinet, attended the ceremony. Antall had prefaced the burial with a series of interviews praising Horthy as a "patriot." The reburial was broadcast on state television and was accompanied by large-scale protests in Budapest.

In contemporary Hungary, the iconography of Horthy is associated with the far-right Jobbik party and its allies. The national-conservative Fidesz has also voiced some positive opinions of Horthy's legacy. Since 2012, Horthy statues, squares have been renamed after, and memorials have been erected to him in numerous villages and cities including Csókakő, Kereki, Gyömrő, and Debrecen. In November 2013, the unveiling of a Horthy statue at a Calvinist church in Budapest drew international attention and criticism.

Der Spiegel has written about the resurgence of what its writers call "the Horthy cult", claiming that Horthy's popularity indicates returning irredentist, reactionary, and ultranationalistic elements within Hungarian domestic politics. Critics have more specifically connected Horthy's popularity to the Magyar Gárda, a paramilitary group that uses Árpád dynasty imagery, and to recent incidents of antiziganist and antisemitic vandalism in Hungary. Meanwhile, Fidesz has, according to reporters, "hedged its bets" on the Horthy controversy, refusing to outright condemn Horthy statues and other commemorations for fear of losing right-wing voters to Jobbik. Some Fidesz politicians have labeled Horthy memorials "provocative," however. This tension has led some to label Fidesz as "implicitly anti-semitic" and to accuse former Prime Minister Viktor Orbán of having had a "revisionist" agenda.

Left-wing groups such as the Hungarian Socialist Party have condemned positive historiography of Horthy. In 2012, for instance, then-party leader Attila Mesterházy condemned the Orbán government's position as "inexcusable", claiming that Fidesz was "openly associating itself with the ideology of the regime that collaborated with the fascists." Words have led to actions in some instances, as when leftist activist Péter Dániel vandalized a rural bust of Horthy by dousing it in red paint and hanging a sign that read "Mass Murderer – War Criminal" around its neck. Ultranationalist vandals reacted by desecrating a Jewish cemetery in Székesfehérvár and vandalizing several Holocaust memorials in Budapest.

In 2017, Orbán affirmed his positive view of Horthy, commenting in a speech that he considers Horthy an "exceptional statesman" and giving him credit for the survival of the Hungarian state in the First World War's aftermath. The U.S. Holocaust Museum responded in a statement denouncing Orbán and the Hungarian government for trying to "rehabilitate the reputation of Hungary's wartime leader, Miklós Horthy, who was a vocal anti-Semite and complicit in the murder of the country's Jewish population during the Holocaust."

In the 2020s, public commemoration of Horthy continued to generate controversy. In June 2021 a statue of Horthy was unveiled on public property in Hajdúbagos. Historian Andrea Pető cited the erection of Horthy statues as an example of changing Hungarian memory politics and attempts to reassess Horthy's responsibility and historical legacy.

In August 2022, the far-right Mi Hazánk party unveiled a bronze bust of Horthy in the parliamentary office of Dóra Dúró, a deputy speaker of the National Assembly. The Federation of Jewish Communities in Hungary called for its removal, while Holocaust survivors later staged a protest inside the Parliament building.

In September 2023, Minister of Construction and Transport János Lázár attended a ceremony at Kenderes marking the thirtieth anniversary of Horthy's reburial. Lázár described Horthy as an "exceptional statesman", a "true Hungarian patriot" and a "heroic soldier". The remarks were criticised by Hungarian Jewish leaders, the Israeli Embassy and United States ambassador David Pressman, who described the event as an attempt to rehabilitate Horthy's legacy.

== Film and television portrayals ==
In the 1985 NBC TV film Wallenberg: A Hero's Story, the role of Horthy was taken by Hungarian-born actor Guy Deghy, who appeared bearded although Horthy (as photographs bore out) appeared consistently clean-shaven throughout his life.

In the 2011 Spanish TV film series, El ángel de Budapest (The angel of Budapest), also set during Wallenberg's time in Hungary in 1944, he is portrayed by actor László Agárdi. In the 2014 American action drama film Walking with the Enemy, Horthy is portrayed by Ben Kingsley. The movie depicts a story of a young man during the Arrow Cross Party takeover in Hungary.

== Honours ==
=== National honours ===
- Military Order of Maria Theresa Grand Cross
- Military Order of Maria Theresa Knight's Cross
- Royal Hungarian Order of Saint Stephen Grand Cross
- Cross of Merit of the Kingdom of Hungary Grand Cross
- Order of Merit of the Kingdom of Hungary Grand Cross
- Order of Merit of the Kingdom of Hungary imposed with the Holy Crown of Hungary Grand Cross
- Hungarian Red Cross Decoration Star
- Military Merit Cross 2nd Class with war decoration
- Order of Leopold Knight's Cross with war decoration
- Order of the Iron Crown 3rd Class with war decoration
- Military Merit Cross 1st Class with war decoration and swords
- Bronze Military Merit Medal "Signum Laudis" with war ribbon and swords
- Bronze Military Merit Medal "Signum Laudis" on red civil ribbon
- Order of the Iron Crown 3rd Class with war decoration and swords
- Hungarian Bronze Military Merit Medal "Signum Laudis"
- Hungarian Bronze Military Merit Medal "Signum Laudis" on war ribbon
- Franz Joseph Commemorative Badge 1st Class
- Karl Troop Cross
- Wound Medal
- Hungarian War Memorial Medal with Swords
- Military Service Cross 1st Class for 50 years of continuous service
- Military Service Cross 2nd Class for 30 years of continuous service
- Military Service Cross 3rd Class for 25 years of continuous service
- 1898 Jubilee Medal (Signum Memoriae)
- 1908 Jubilee Cross
- Mobilization Cross 1912/13
- Order of Vitéz

=== Foreign honours ===
Coat of arms of Miklós Horthy as Knight of the Order of Charles III (Spain)

- Albania: Order of Besa, Grand Cross
- Austria
  - War Commemorative Medal
  - Order of Merit, Grand Cross
- Belgium: Order of Leopold, Grand Cordon
- Bulgaria:
  - Memorial medal "For Participation In The European War 1915–1918"
  - Order of Saints Cyril and Methodius, Grand Cross
- Chile: Order of Merit, Grand Cross
- Croatia: Grand Order of the Crown of King Zvonimir
- Denmark: Order of the Elephant
- Kingdom of Egypt: Order of Muhammad Ali, Grand Cross
- Estonia
  - Order of the Cross of the Eagle, 1st Class
  - Cross of Liberty
  - Order of the Estonian Red Cross, 1st Class
  - Collar of the Order of the White Star
- Finland
  - Order of the White Rose of Finland, Grand Cross
  - Memorial Medal of the Winter War (1939-1940)
- German Empire:
  - Iron Cross
    - 1st Class (1914)
    - 2nd Class (1914)
  - Kingdom of Bavaria:
    - Order of Saint Michael, 2nd Class
  - Prussia:
    - Order of Saint John (Bailiwick of Brandenburg)
    - Order of the Red Eagle, 2nd Class with Swords
    - Order of the Crown, 3rd Class
- Nazi Germany
  - Knight's Cross of the Iron Cross
  - Iron Cross
    - Clasp to the Iron Cross 1st Class
    - Clasp to the Iron Cross 2nd Class
  - The Honour Cross of the World War 1914/1918
  - Order of the German Eagle, Grand Cross
- Greece: Order of the Redeemer, Grand Cross
- Kingdom of Italy:
  - Order of the Crown of Italy, Grand Officer
  - Supreme Order of the Most Holy Annunciation
- Japanese Empire: Order of the Chrysanthemum, Grand Cross
- Latvia: Order of the Three Stars Commander, Grand Cross with Chain
- SMOM: Sovereign Military Order of Malta, 1st Class
- Montenegro:
  - Jubilee Medal 1908 (Montenegro)
  - Order of Prince Danilo I, 2nd Class
- Netherlands: Order of the Netherlands Lion, Grand Cross
- Norway: Order of St. Olav, Grand Cross
- Ottoman Empire:
  - Imtiyaz Medal
  - Order of Osmanieh, 2nd Class
  - Iron Crescent
- Poland:
  - Order of the White Eagle, Grand Cross
- Spain: Order of Charles III, Collar and Grand Cross of Collar
- Sweden: Royal Order of the Seraphim
- Thailand: Order of the White Elephant, Grand Cross
- Vatican:
  - Order of the Golden Spur, Cross
  - Order of the Holy Sepulchre, Grand Cross
- Kingdom of Yugoslavia: Order of Karađorđe's Star, Grand Cross

=== Postage stamps ===
- Horthy was honoured by issuance of multiple postage stamps by Hungary. Some of them issued: on 1 March 1930, on 1 January 1938, on 1 March 1940, on 18 June 1941 and on 18 June 1941.

== See also ==
- El ángel de Budapest
- European interwar dictatorships
- History of Hungary
- Mediterranean naval engagements during World War I

== Notes ==
Political offices
Preceded by Zoltán Szabó	Minister of War of the Counter-Government; 1919	Succeeded by Sándor Belitska
Preceded by Károly Huszár as acting Head of State	Regent of Hungary; 1920–1944	Succeeded by Ferenc Szálasi as Leader of the Nation
Military offices
Preceded by Maximilian Njegovan	Commander-in-Chief of the Austro-Hungarian Naval Fleet; 1918	Succeeded by Janko Vuković
Honorary titles
New title	Captain General of the Order of Vitéz; 1920–1957	Succeeded by Archduke Joseph August
