= Horthy (surname) =

Horthy is a Hungarian surname. It may refer to:

- The Horthy family
  - Miklós Horthy (1868–1957), regent of Hungary from 1920 to 1944
  - István Horthy (1904–1942), Hungarian politician, elder son of Miklós
  - Miklós Horthy Jr. (1907–1993), Hungarian politician, younger son of Miklós
  - István Horthy Jr. (born 1941), Hungarian architect, son of István
