= Magdolna Purgly =

Spouse of Regent of Hungary Miklós Horthy (1881–1959)

Her Serene Highness dame Magdolna Purgly
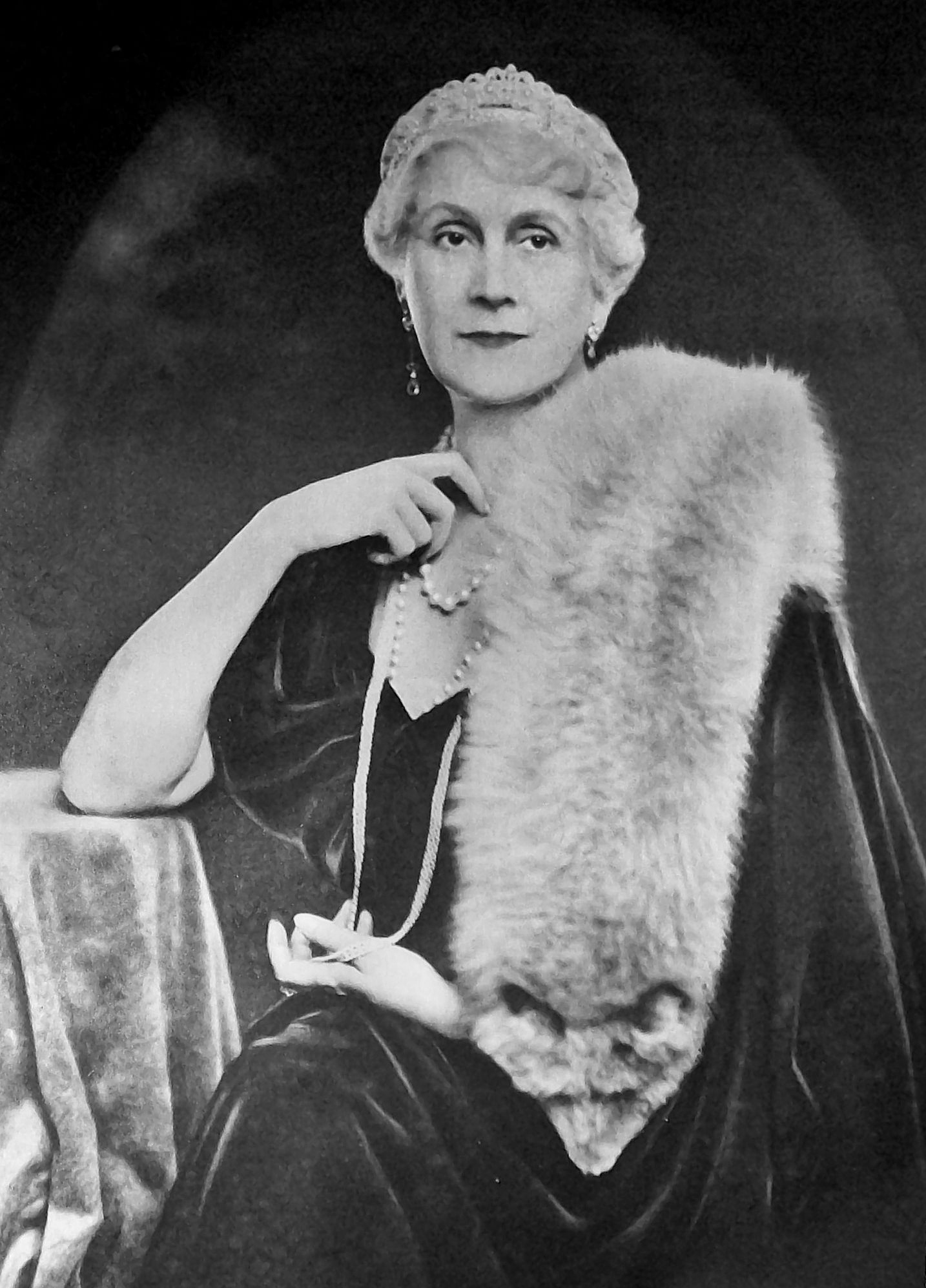

Spouse of the Regent of Hungary
- Assumed role 1 March 1920 – 15 October 1944
- Monarch: Vacant
- Preceded by: Ilona Mezviczky (Spouse of the Head of State of Hungary)
- Succeeded by: Gizella Lutz

Personal details
- Born: Magdolna Vilma Benedikta Purgly de Jószáshely; 10 June 1881 Sofronya, Kingdom of Hungary, Austria-Hungary
- Died: 8 January 1959 (aged 77) Estoril, Lisbon, Portugal
- Spouse: Miklós Horthy (m. 1901)
- Children: 4, including István and Miklós

Dame Magdolna Vilma Benedikta Purgly de Jószáshely (10 June 1881 – 8 January 1959) was the wife of Admiral Miklós Horthy.

== Early life ==
Magdolna was born as the youngest daughter of Hungarian nobleman Janos Purgly de Jószáshelyi (1839-1911) and his wife Ilona Vásárhelyi de Kézdivásárhely (1841-1896). She was confined to talking with suitors until she was an adult by her parents. She met a fellow nobleman Miklós Horthy, who was 13 years her senior, when accompanying his brother-in-law who was a friend of her family. Horthy's military background and many experiences attracted Magdolna. The attraction was mutual.

They were married on 22 July 1901 at Arad, her family's estate of Hejobába being not far away. Miklós and Magdolna spent their honeymoon in Semmering, Austria. After this, Mrs. Horthy lived the life of an officer's wife, accompanying her husband to his official stations. Between 1901 and 1908, Horthy was stationed in Pola, where they built a new home, and where their children were born: Magdolna (1902), Paula (1903), István (1904) and Miklós (1907). In 1903 Horthy was given the command of the new battleship SMS Habsburg, then the flagship of the Empire's Mediterranean Squadron. He was able to take his wife and daughter on the warship's courtesy cruise to Smyrna, in Turkey. Afterwards, he was in command of SMS Lacroma, the naval yacht of Commander of the Fleet Admiral Count Rudolf Montecuccoli (1843-1922) and then became Captain of SMS Taurus, the Embassy yacht in Constantinople, arriving there to take up his post on 8 June 1908. He was subsequently presented by the Austro-Hungarian Ambassador to the Ottoman Emperor, Sultan Abdul Hamid II (1842-1918). The family resided there, for a year, in a villa at Yenikeul on the banks of the Bosporus. In 1909 Horthy was appointed naval Aide-de-Camp to the Emperor Franz Josef I at the Court in Vienna, for five years, where Horthy and his wife and children had an official apartment in the Hofburg.

== World War I ==
Magdolna Horthy and her children spent the years of The Great War back in Pola and as a result met with her husband rarely. By later 1918, it was clear that the Austro-Hungarian Monarchy could lose the war. Magdolna gleaned information about Horthy's appointment as rear-admiral only from mutual acquaintances. At the end of October 1918 Horthy, Magdolna and the four children were forced to leave Pola since it had been ceded by the victorious Allies to the Kingdom of Serbs, Croats and Slovenes; brigands were roaming the streets as it had been announced that all Austrian and Hungarian property was to be confiscated and now belonged to the new State. Horthy records "we shut up the house in which we had spent so many happy years, the house which had seen the birth of my children, and left never to return. All the household goods, silver, carpets, pictures, were left behind." With Magdolna's family's lands in Arad having been in that part of Hungary were lost to Romania, Horthy, Magdolna and their children travelled to Vienna and subsequently in November to Horthy's estate at Kenderes in Hungary.

== 1919–1920 ==
Horthy prepared for a more peaceful life in his family's estate, with his wife's approval.

Count Gyula Károlyi requested Horthy to come to Szeged to take part in the counter-revolution against and elimination of the communist regime from Hungary. On 1 March 1920, Horthy was later elected Regent of Hungary by the National Parliament at Budapest and Magdolna became styled "Her Serene Highness" (Hungarian: Főméltóságú Asszony).

== Under Horthy's Regency ==
=== The early years of the Regency ===
In the next few years, the foremost goal of her life was to provide a safe and calm home for Miklós Horthy. Madam Horthy appeared in public extremely rarely. In essence, the family had a modest life when taking into account Horthy's position; the highest point of it was the annual garden-party. Their residence was in the Buda Castle when they were in Budapest and they took up nine rooms (of 814 in total). The Horthy family's retreat was at Kenderes Castle.

=== After 1935 ===
After 1935, Mrs. Horthy appeared in public more frequently. Her goal was to ensure that Horthy would remain Regent. The greatest danger to his position came from extreme-right groups like the Arrow Cross Party led by Ferenc Szálasi. She worked to support the nation and its independence with her personal prestige. In this period, such actions carried anti-Fascist implications. She did not directly participate in politics, but expressed herself in a way that befitted her position. She staunchly rejected every temptation to found a "Horthy Dynasty". In 1938, she founded a charity with the purpose of trying to help the poor of the recently regained part of Felvidék.

From 1940, she lived in perpetual anxiety and was not able shake off the thought that the Regency was threatened by events, and she feared to think how it might end. In private company, she often said: "we came to power in a decent way, through the door, but I fear that we will only get out of here through the window". Her concern did not materialize word for word, but it is true that the Horthy family left the Castle of Buda on 17 October 1944 after her husband's deposition by the Arrow Cross Party with Nazi assistance.

== Post-War life ==
After the end of World War II, the family lived in Weilheim in Oberbayern for four years. This period was unfavorable to Magdolna's health. Due to her son's diplomatic skill, the family managed to move to Estoril, Portugal, where she died in 1959, two years after her husband's death.
