= MÁVAG =

Defunct Hungarian rail vehicle manufacturer

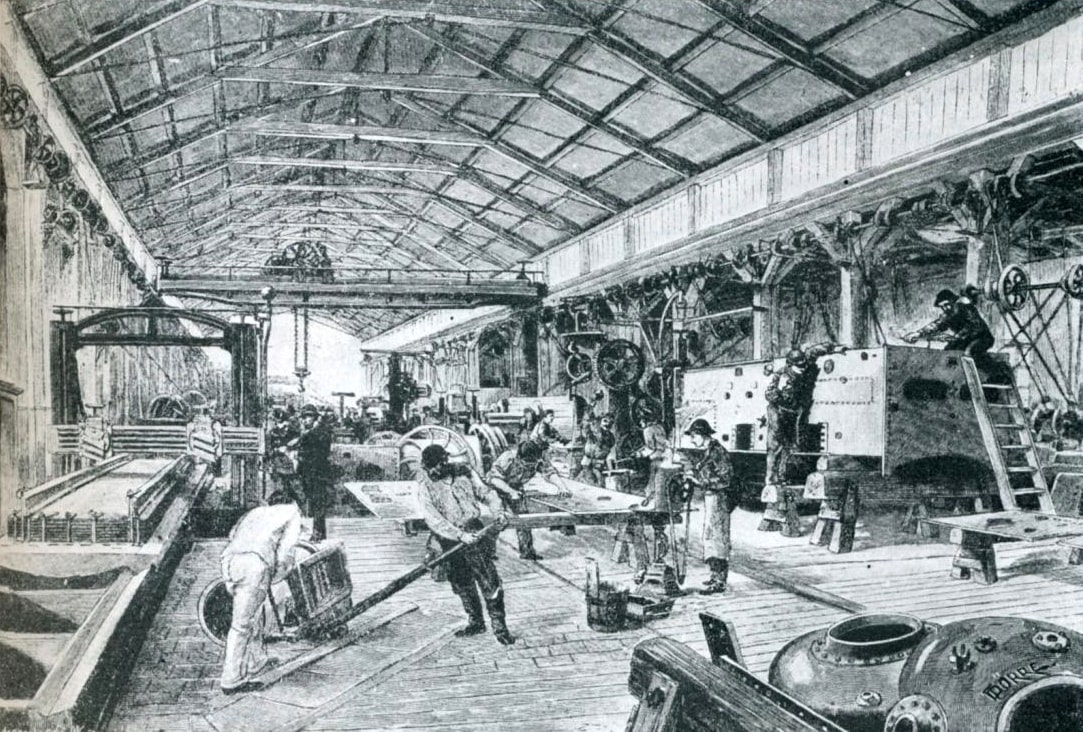
- Type: Subsidiary
- Industry: Rail transport
- Founded: 1892; 134 years ago
- Defunct: 1959
- Headquarters: Budapest, Hungary
- Area served: Worldwide

,MÁVAG (Magyar Királyi Állami Vas-, Acél- és Gépgyárak; Hungarian Royal State Iron, Steel and Machine Factories) was the largest Hungarian rail vehicle producer. MÁVAG company was the second largest industrial enterprise after the Manfréd Weiss Steel and Metal Works in the Hungarian half of the Austro-Hungarian Monarchy. MÁVAG was the property of the Kingdom of Hungary. After World War II MÁVAG was nationalized, and "Királyi" ("Royal") was removed from its name.

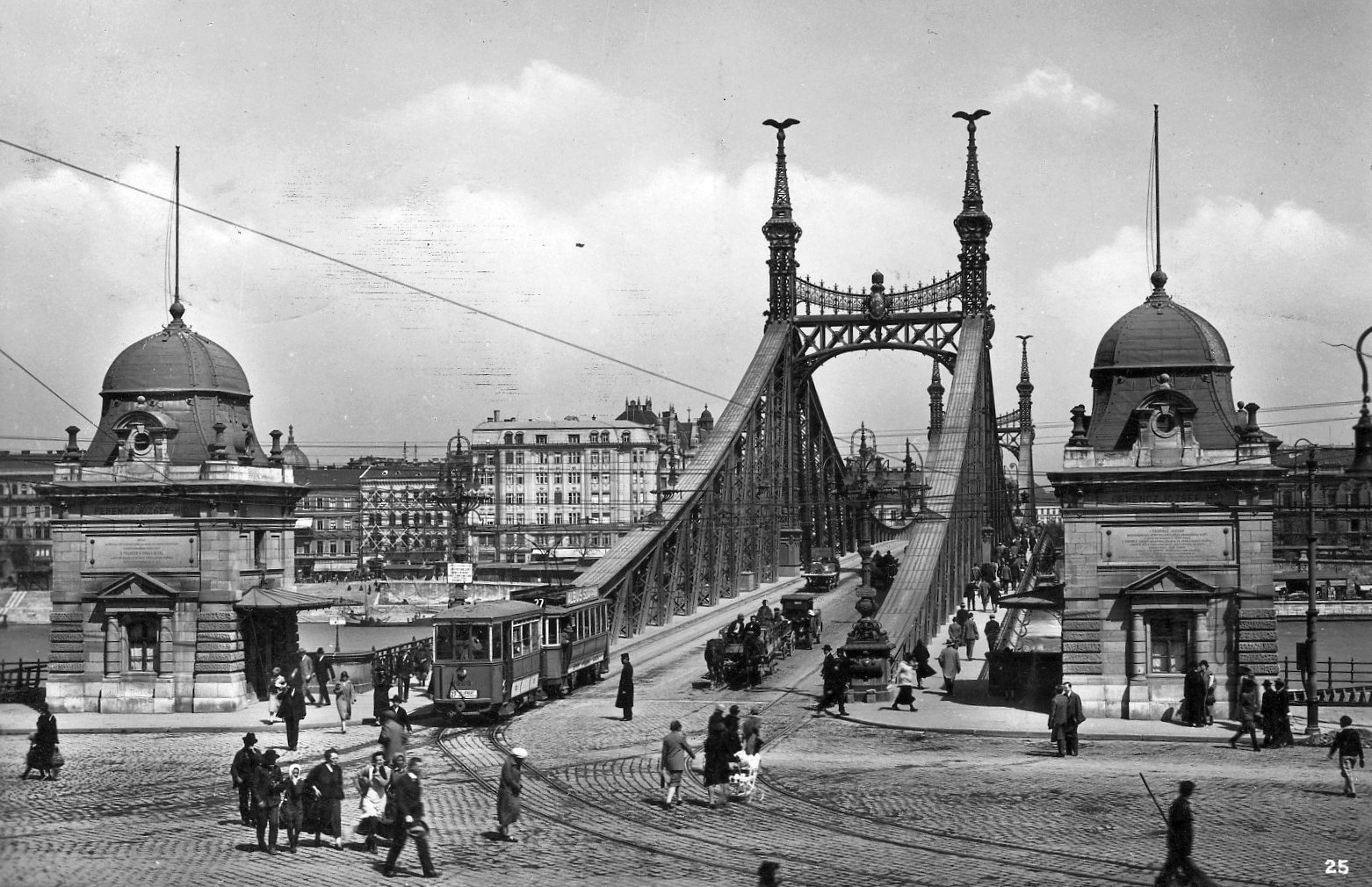
Franz Joseph Bridge

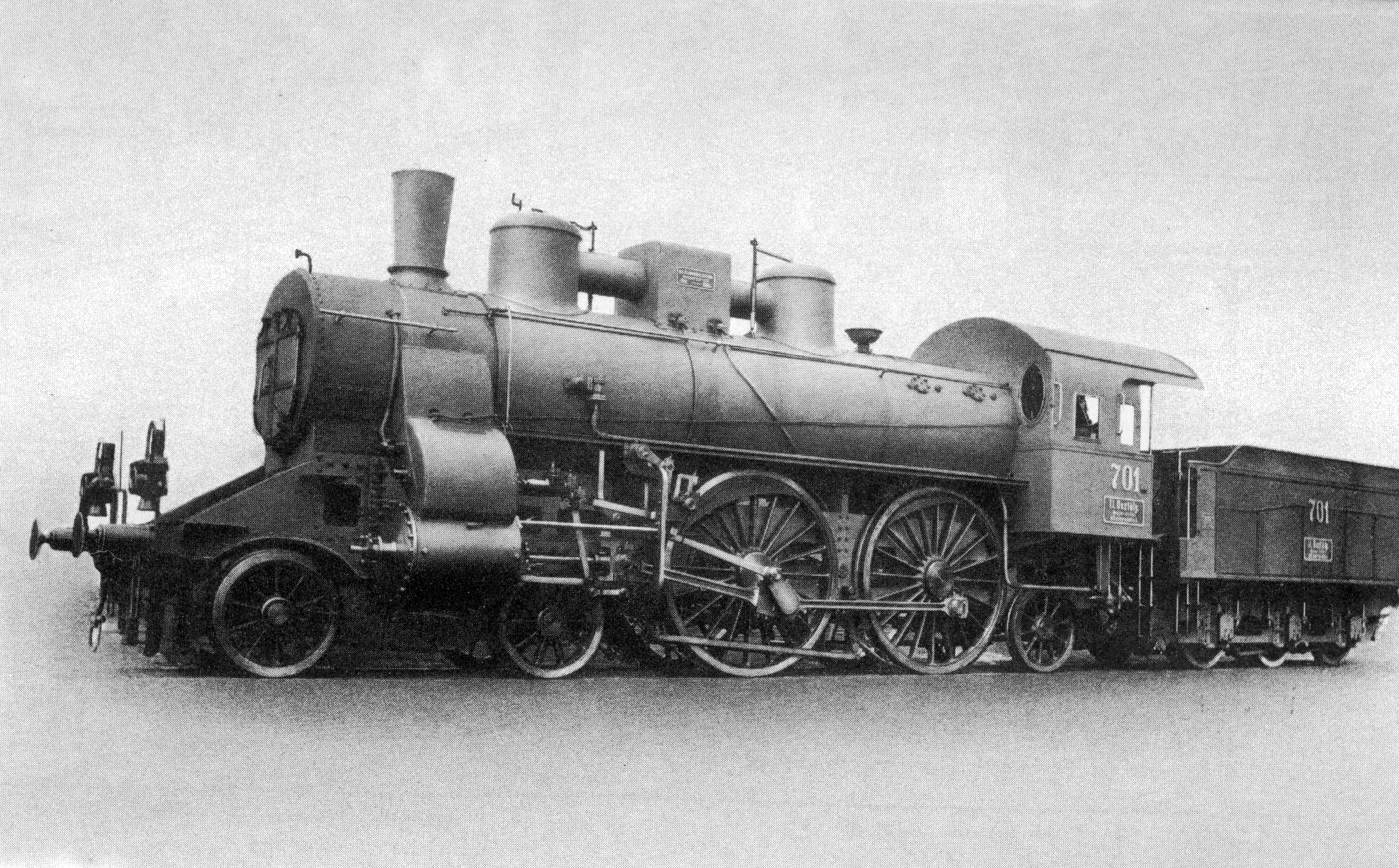
The 1500th engine of the factory

The company employed thousands of workers. The buildings were in the VIII. district of Budapest, bordered by the following streets: Kőbányai street, Hungária avenue, Vajda Péter street, and Orczy street. It was the most important Hungarian machine factory in the 19th century, along with Csepel Művek (Csepel Factories). The most respected products of MÁVAG were steam locomotives. The first was produced in 1873, and MÁVAG produced the famous locomotive no. 424 from 1924. MÁVAG's neighbouring company was the Ganz motor- és vagongyár (Ganz engine and wagon factory), which manufactured diesel locomotives and luxury carriages for export.

In 1959 MÁVAG merged with the Ganz company and was renamed Ganz-MÁVAG.

== The beginnings ==
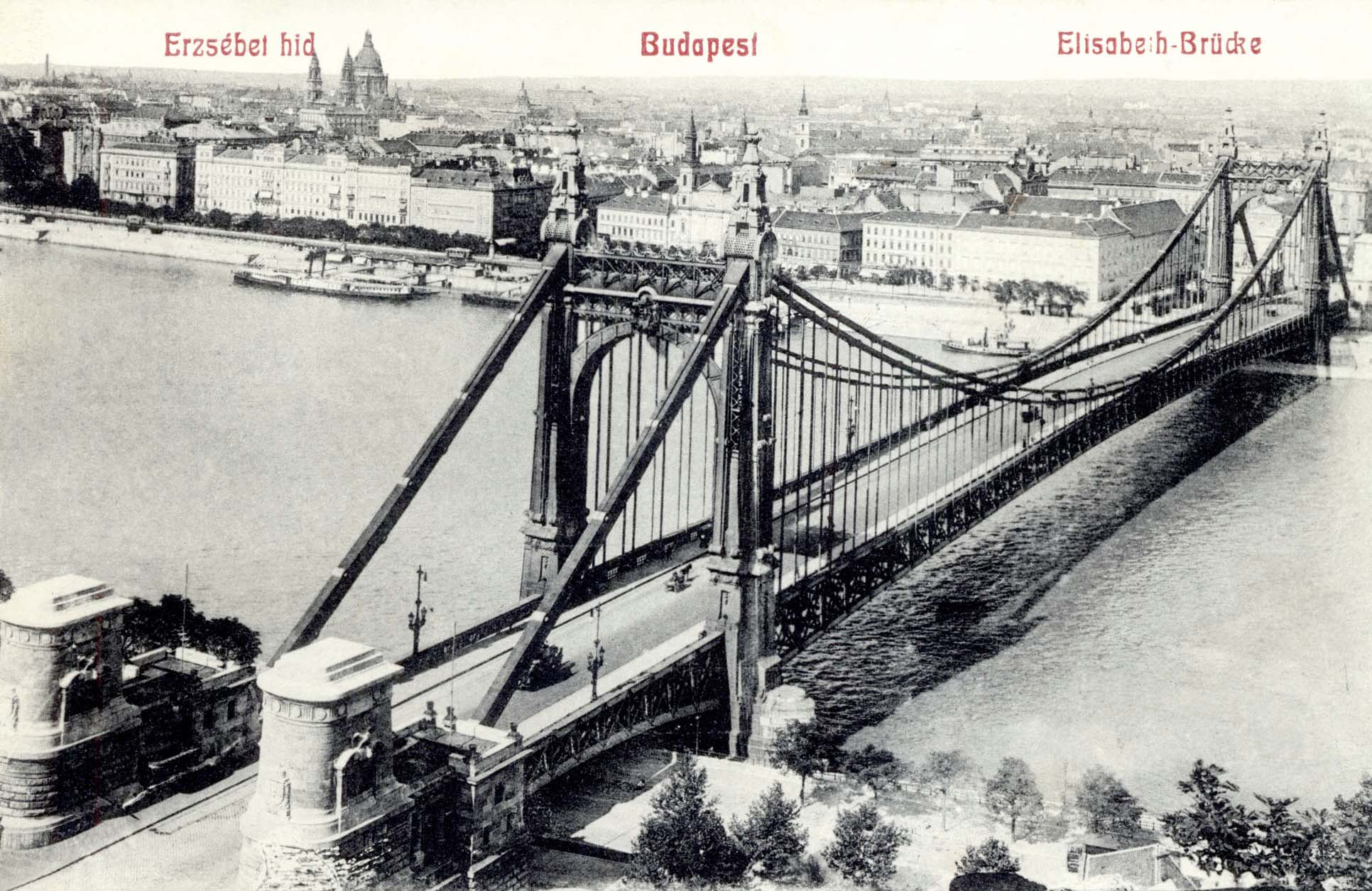
The Elizabeth Bridge

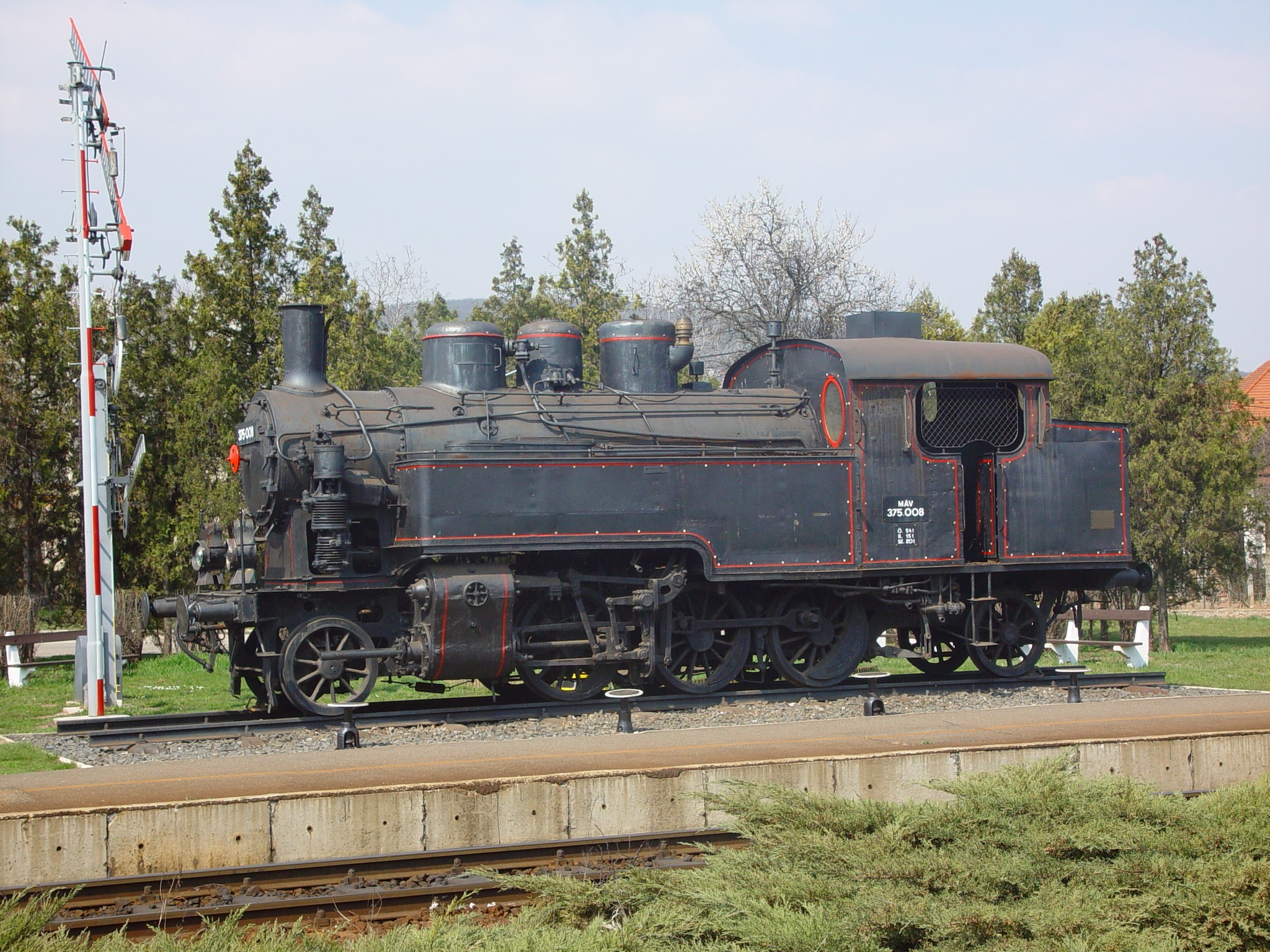
A MÁV Class 375 Engine

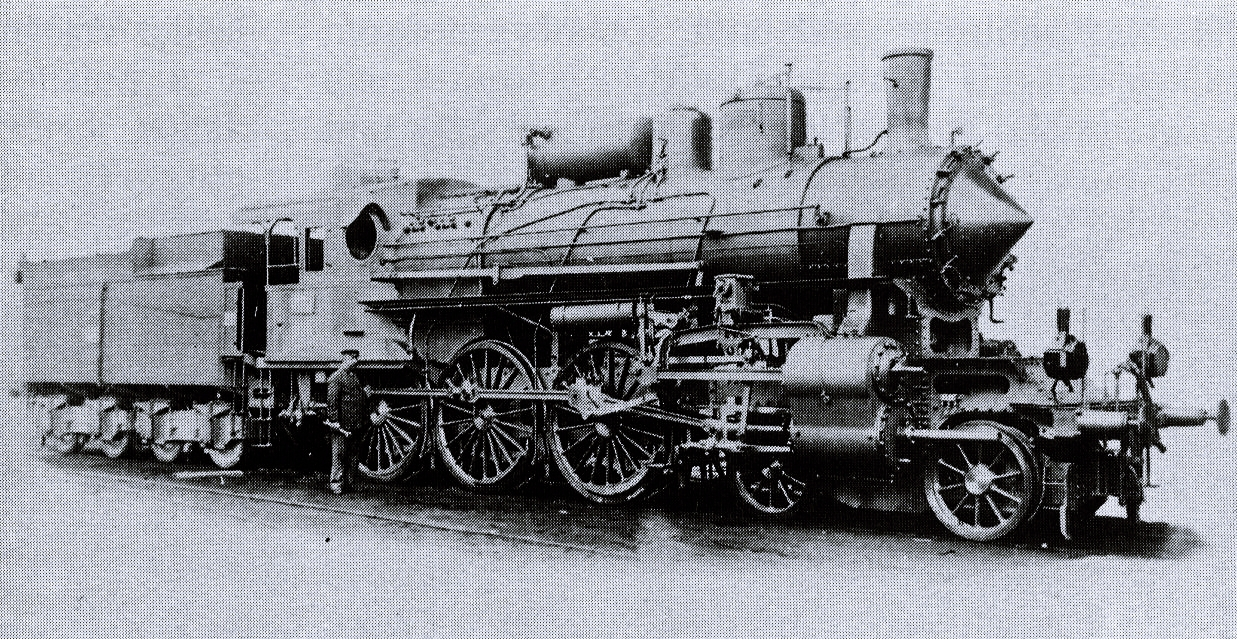
A MÁV Class 327 Engine

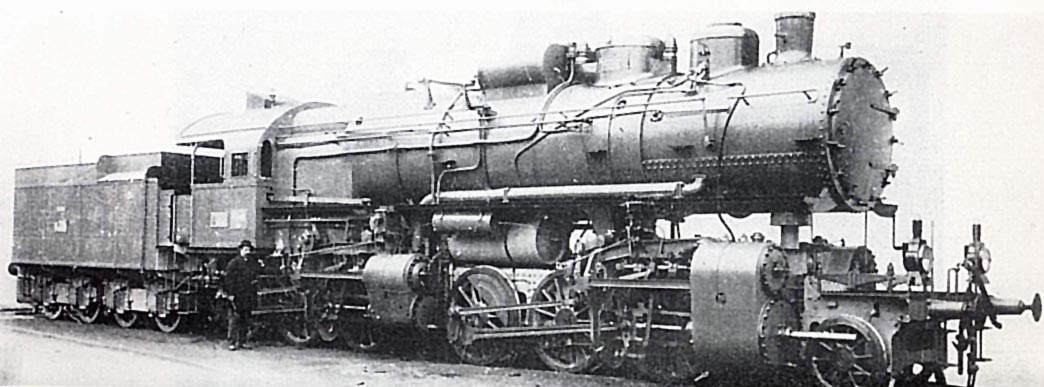
The strongest steam engine of Europe: a MÁV Class 601 engine

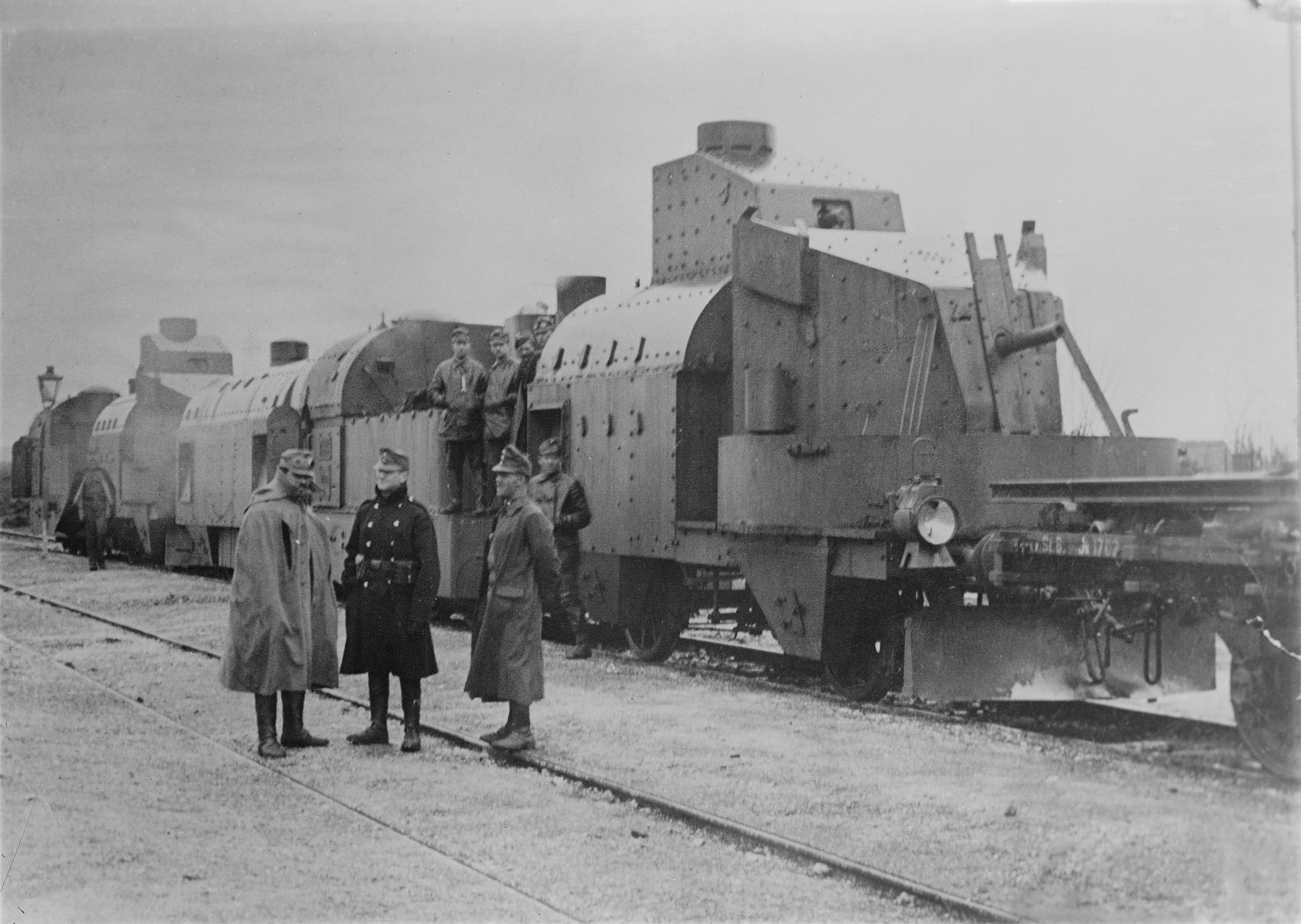
MÁVAG armoured train in 1914

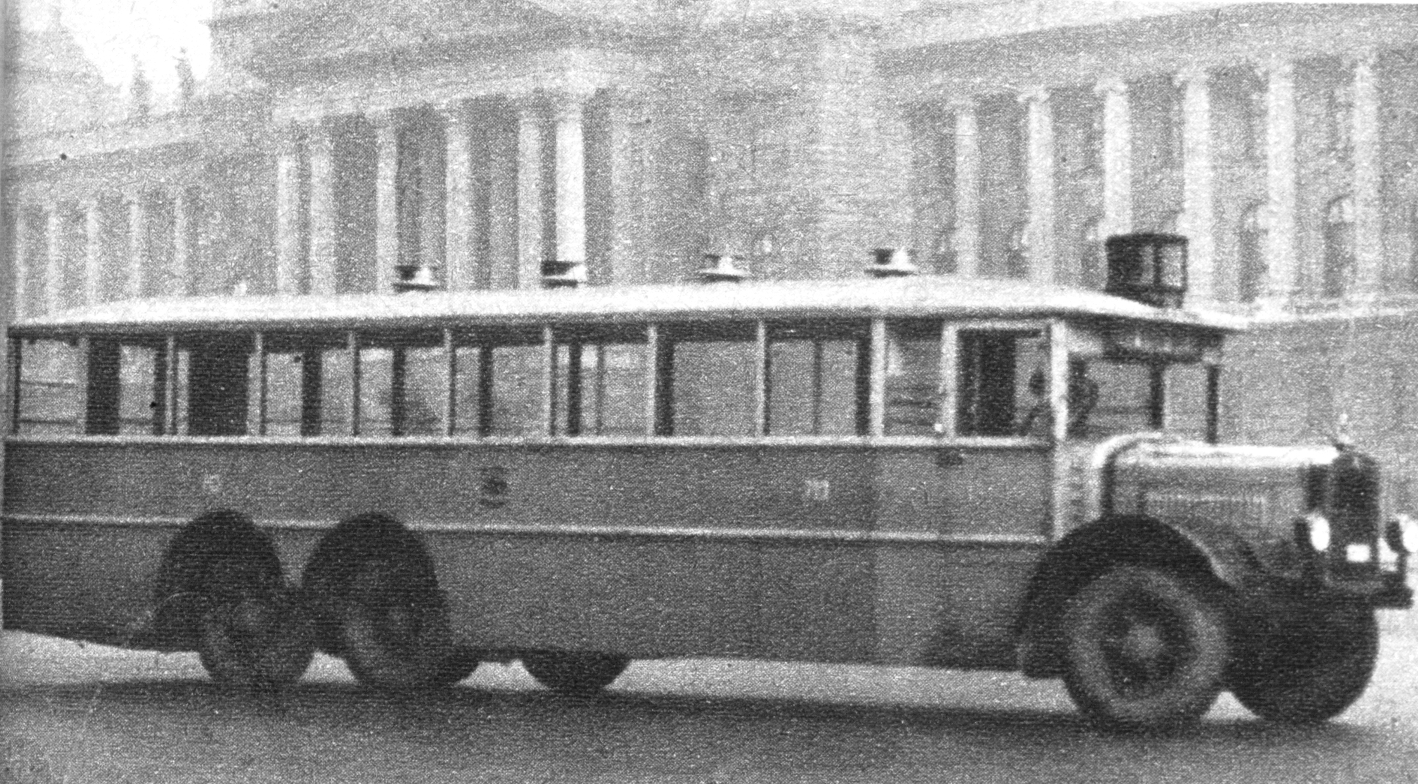
Three-axle MÁVAG bus

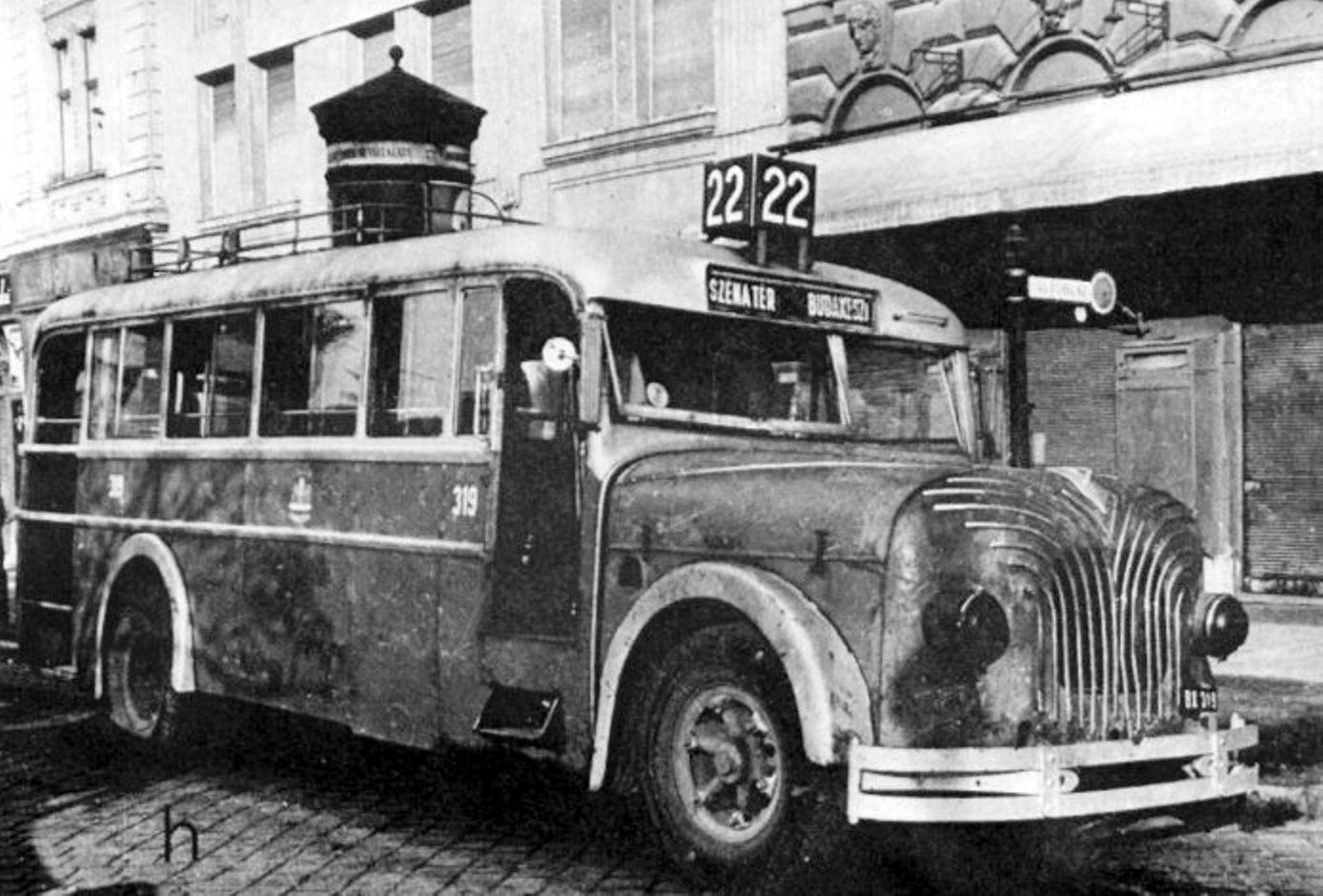
Mávag "catfish-nose" bus type BX 319 N2h/39

Construction of Hungary's first railway line began in the second half of 1844. It is said that this was the first time that a steam locomotive was used on the completed line between Pest and Rákospalota, and later between Pest and Vác. The opening ceremony took place on 15 July 1846.

The two predecessors of the Kőbányai út Machine Works were the Hungarian-Belgian Machine and Drive Building Company, founded in 1868, and the Hungarian-Swiss Railway Carriage Works, established on the site of the Northern Vehicle Repair Works. The latter company built the majority of the traction vehicles for the Alföld-Fiume Railway. However, by 1870 both companies had gone bankrupt and were liquidated.

The two plants were purchased by the Hungarian state and placed under joint control on 1 August 1870. The state founded the Machinery and Wagon Factory of the Hungarian Royal Railways and first handed it over to the management of MÁV, before establishing its own board. The first director of the factory was Frigyes Zimmermann.

After the Austro-Hungarian compromise of 1867, the legal obstacles of the development of national industry were eliminated, and the export of the locomotives became available. Corporate (private) railways have grown, which, along with MÁV, demanded a large number of locomotives and wagons. The factory started production of vehicles in 1872, the first of which was the first domestic production III of 50 coke trucks and according to the plans of the Sigl factory in Vienna. class (later 335 series) freight train steamer in 1873, which was presented at the Vienna World Exhibition that year.

Due to the global economic crisis, the company was temporarily reassigned to MÁV. On 28 July 1873, the building of the former Hungarian-Swiss Wagon Factory burnt down. It was rebuilt and turned into MÁV's main workshop (→ North Main Workshop). The factory's first proprietary-designed locomotive, number 7, was completed in 1878. The company produced a C-axis universal locomotive, the "Szolnok", for the Tiszavidék Vasút (later became the MÁV IIId). It was given the 314 series mark, and was introduced at the Paris World Expo the same year. In 1877, the factory started to produce agricultural machinery and threshing machines.

In 1880, the Hungarian government merged the factory with the Diósgyőr Ironworks and established a joint management company under the name "Hungarian Royal State Railways Machine Factory and Diósgyőr Hungarian Royal Iron and Steel Factory Directorate, Budapest". In 1881, the factory was able to build larger bridges and built several bridges for the MÁV and Kassa-Oderberg Railways, as well as the iron structure of the Keleti Railway Station. The factory was taken over by Zsigmond Kordina in June 1881. The first truly remarkable domestic-developed locomotive was the 1883 10th, MÁV class Ia, and later the 220 Series locomotive. In the same year, the first composite locomotive of the factory was completed, MÁV Class 56, 568, and later in the series 20, which was the 75th finished steamer of the factory. Starting in 1884, the company was managed directly by the ministry of commerce. The director of the factory became Nándor Förster in 1890, the year the mill's threshing machine was completed.

The factory's 500th steam locomotive is number 28, at MÁV IIIe. Class 2535 (later 326 series) locomotives were handed over on 31 May 1893. The thousandth locomotive, MÁV Int., Number 31, has a 468-track (222 series) locomotive was completed in 1896 and presented at the Millennium Exhibition. In 1896, the factory made the steel structure of the Újpest railway bridge and the Ferencz József bridge (today: Freedom Bridge). In 1896, when Hungary celebrated the 1000th anniversary of Hungarian settlement, the 1000th locomotive was exhibited.

The 1500th locomotive of the factory was built in 1900, Il. class 701 psz. (201/202 series), which is IVd of Structure 46. Class 4405 (422 Series) and Transylvanian Mining Route with Govasdia Narrow Gauge Locomotive won the Grand Prix of the Paris World Expo, similarly to the plant's harvesting and threshing machines and locomotives.

From 1900, Károly Vajkay, director of the ironworks, and from 1903 Pál Róth became the director of the Ironworks.

== Golden Era 1892 - 1914 ==
The 20th century started with an economic downturn: the factory dropped 100 pieces of steam locomotives annually by 1904, almost half of them were made abroad, mainly in Italy. At that time, the vehicle parts of the electric locomotives (VM1 and VM4 factory) produced for the Italian railway, Val Tellina, were also prepared for Ganz & Partners. Also for Ganz and Partner, the factory boiler plant delivered 159 de Dion-Bouton-based steam generators to the Ganz steam engine.

The factory's bridging class then worked on major orders: they were built in 1898 and handed over to Budapest. At the time of the construction of the bridge, it was the largest chain bridge in the world (290m). Structure Aurél Czekelius, beautiful gates were designed by Virgil Nagy. Steel structures were made by the Hungarian Royal State Ironworks. At this time, the 400 meter Tisza Bridge of the Algyő railway was built.

After the recession, steam locomotive production has risen again: by the year 1910, the factory had already produced 250 locomotives per year. In the 1900s, the Hungarian Royal State Iron Works planned and produced a number of steam locomotives of much larger size and power than before.

- the 71st-class, in-class (later series 203) high-speed train,
- the 84th factory IIIs. Class IV (later: 322 series) passenger trains,
- 90, 108, 114 IIIu. Class IV (later: 324 series) freight and passenger trains,
- 62nd factory IVe. Class 1 (later: 401 Series) Mallet System Speedway,
- 87th factory VIm. Class 1 (later: 651 Series) Mallet System Trains, or by-line service
- the TV. and TVa. (Classes 74, 92, 93, 110 and 115, and 91, 109, 116).

The 324 series of locomotives were produced for decades in the largest number of ever produced Hungarian steam locomotives in a total of 905 units, while 375 locomotives were manufactured for half a century - the latest version of the steam engine was the latest Hungarian version. In 1908, the In. Class was built to 816 (later 203,015) locomotive locomotives in the factory. At that time, the factory's main builder, Zsigmond Kordina, was Dvorak Hubert.

The bridgehead then made the Baja-Bátaszék, the Komárom railway and the Danube bridges. For agriculture, CT and XCT road steam locomotives, various locomobiles and steam bricks were built.

In the 1910s, with a few exceptions, the factory built only superheated steam locomotives. The two fast train locomotive types of the era, one of the most powerful 2'C1 'axle locomotives in Europe, are factory-fitted (301) and 102 and 103 (327 series) steam locomotives suitable for slopes with weaker superstructures. Until its outbreak, it produced 22 and 140 copies. The 327,023 steam locomotive delivered in 1913 was a locomotive bearing the factory's 3000th serial number.

The Hungarian Royal State Iron Factories have produced the 1051 Series Mallet system of the 1051 series, which is the largest and most powerful locomotive of the age in Europe until the construction of the MÁV Class 601 Engines were built in the MÁVAG factory in 1914. Unit 31 was the factory's 4000th factory locomotive, which was completed in 1917. By this time, the annual capacity of the factory exceeded 300, but the demand also required the manufacture of some smaller types in other plants. Due to the war copper deficiency, from 1915 only the Brotan-Deffner-system boilers with steel water pipes were made including the already mentioned 324, 375, 376 and 601 series locomotives. The first suburban locomotives were also completed: the first copies of the three-wheeled 342-series locomotives and the four-wheeled 442-series locomotives.

In addition, new 2'C axle-mounted high-speed trains (328 series), 1'D-axle heavy-duty trains (424 series) and C'C-axis Mallet-system trains (620 series) have been designed. However, only the production of the Series 328 series 118 could begin with these types.

The four cylinder Mallet -type Class 601 engines with their 22.5 meter length and 2200 KW power, were the largest and most powerful steam locomotives which have ever built before (and during) the First World War in Europe.

== Interwar Period ==
The loss of the First World War did not initially have a significant impact on the life of the factory. Because of the large number of modern locomotives that had been taken away during the Romanian occupation following the fall of the Soviet Republic and that the Trianon Peace Treaty had condemned to neighbouring countries, MÁV did not cancel its wartime orders, and was able to deliver hundreds of new locomotives up to 1923. Hubert Dvorák, who had been the chief engineer until 1919, became the factory's director in 1919. In 1925, the Budapest and Diósgyőr ironworks were merged with the Győr Ágyúgyár and the company was renamed MÁVAG (Hungarian Royal State Iron, Steel and Machine Works). During this period, the bridge division built two major bridges: the Danube Bridge at Danube-Földvár and the Horthy Miklós (now Petőfi) Bridge.

Among the agricultural machinery, 405 tractors can be mentioned between the two wars.

István Horthy, the son of the governor, became the director of MÁVAG on 1 July 1937. The MÁV Class 424 and others

By 1924, the first new type of steam locomotive of the post-war period had been completed, the first of the 122nd type, the Class 424, which later became famous in Europe. The wartime design was completely revised, the boiler dimensions were increased considerably and the axle arrangement was modified. The resulting solution was a fine example of the ingenuity of the "poor man of purpose": it was suitable for covering all the traffic needs between the two wars, from heavy freight trains to heavy passenger and high-speed trains. The vehicle type remained in production for more than three decades, and MÁVAG produced 514 of them, not only for MÁV, but also for several foreign railway companies after the Second World War. At that time, however, MÁV was only able to purchase 26 of them, due to its limited resources. The purchase of the 424,027, the 5000th locomotive of the factory, could only be made after lengthy financial negotiations, in fact for prestige reasons. In 1928, the "little brothers" of the 424, the so-called "engine replacement" steam locomotives of the 22 series, the 126th series, were born, which in the reduced traffic due to the economic crisis not only carried branch line trains, but also light main line express trains. Both types were characterised by multi-purpose use, simple construction, low coal consumption and low maintenance costs.

In the 1930s, MÁVAG was also caught up in the winds of industrial design and streamlining. In this spirit, and as a competitor to the Ganz factory's "ÁRPÁD" high-speed rail buses, the streamlined steam locomotive series 242, construction number 129, was born. However, due to its limited performance it did not become a significant series. In any case, the 1930s were not a time for steam locomotive production in the poor economic climate. The low point was 1934, when only three steam locomotives were built, but until the outbreak of war there was no year in which the output reached 20 locomotives. Only the boiler shop produced in earnest: more than 500 locomotive boilers were delivered to Indian orders.

MÁVAG was involved in the electrification of MÁV's railways from the very beginning: the factory produced the rolling stock for 29 VM7 (V40 series) and 3 VM8 (V60 series) factory-built Kando-type phase-change electric locomotives.

Up until 1959 the company produced 7578 locomotives. MÁVAG exported many locomotives: from 1900, to Italy and Romania, later to Egypt, India, Yugoslavia, and Korea. After 1945 the company exported diesel trains to the USSR, and in 1961 became well known there for Д_{1} local diesel trains.

=== Car manufacturing, the MÁVAG-Ford ===
In the late 1920s, MÁVAG also became involved in car production. MÁVAG first attempted to produce passenger cars in 1928-1929, when they started to produce the MÁVAG-Mercedes L1000 chassis under an agreement with Daimler-Benz in Stuttgart. The chassis were fitted with a body for passenger cars, ambulances and minibuses. A series of 20 chassis was produced.[2]

After MÁG stopped producing passenger cars in 1930, the ageing of the taxi fleet became a growing problem during the 1930s.

The start of taxi production was also helped by a licensing agreement signed in 1937 with the Cologne-based Ford-Werke company on the initiative of István Horthy, the general manager of MÁVAG, under which MÁVAG began assembling the Eifel and V8 models for use as taxis in Hungary around 1938. The cars were usually referred to as "MÁVAG-Ford".[3] Assembly of the Ford V8 model soon began at MÁVAG's factory on Steinbánya Road. In 1937, 120 of these were built for Autótaxi Rt. However, the Ford V8 model with the V-8 engine was more in the luxury class and was not suitable for taxis.

Subsequently, the production and domestic assembly of the much cheaper four-cylinder Ford Eifel model began. The size of the small car was too small and the two-door design was not an advantage. Although the Eifel models were modified in Hungary (lengthening the wheelbase) to improve passenger comfort, the car was not structurally suitable[4] and the shortcomings of Hungarian technology were revealed in the conversion of the Ford Eifel: the Eifel taxis broke their propeller shafts on the first day and had to be returned to the factory. The smaller Eifel model produced 40 standard and 120 taxis, the larger V8 produced 30 standard and 110 taxis until the changeover to military production. In 1938, 237 MÁVAG-Fords were produced, of which 120 were Ford Eifel and 117 Ford V8. This was the end of the MÁVAG-Ford story.

== World War Two ==
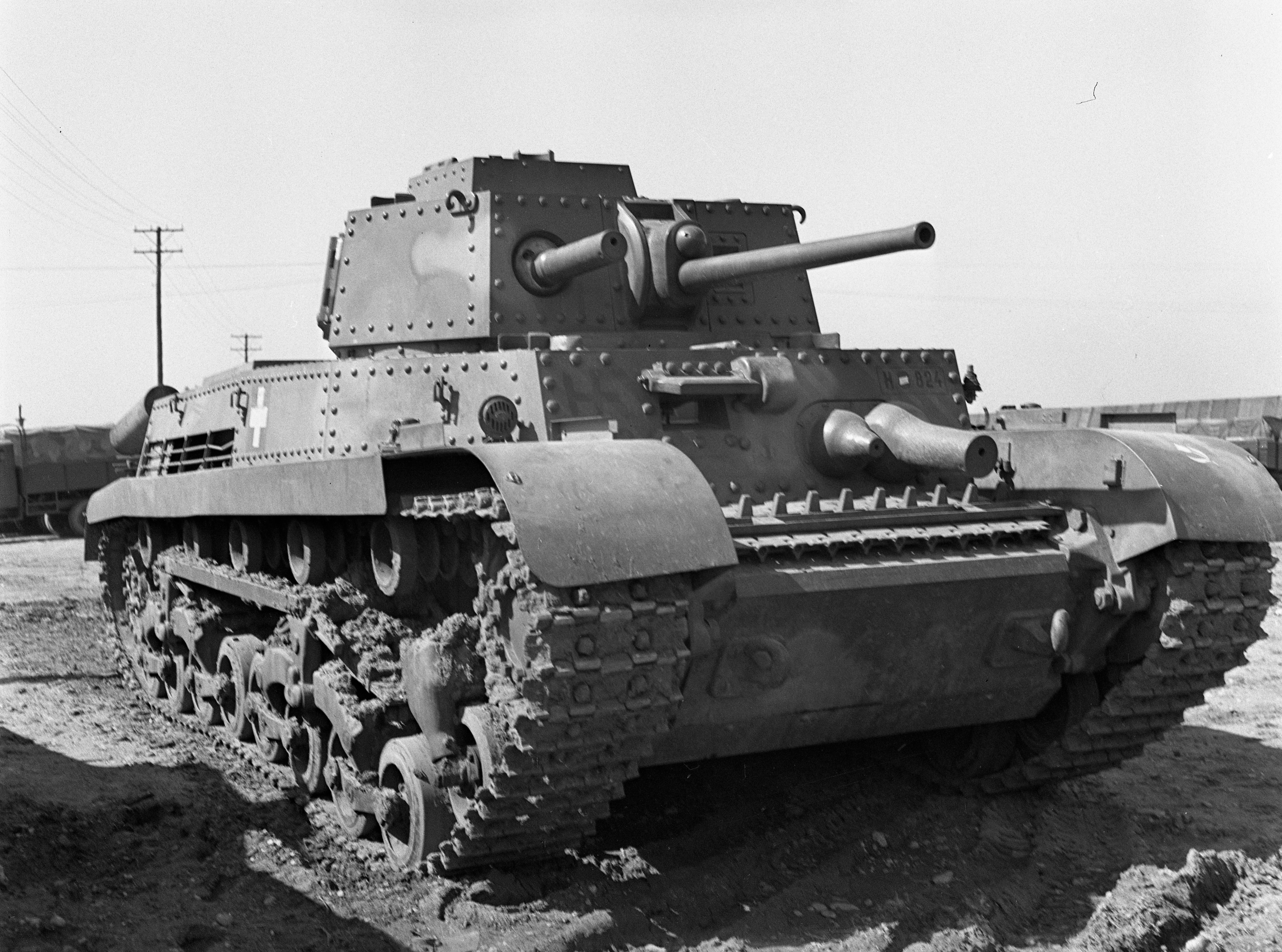
A Hungarian 40M Turán I tank

During the Second World War, MÁVAG, together with Weiss Manfréd Steel and Metal Works, became the most important military factory in the country.

MÁVAG delivered 82 Toldi light tanks in 1938-1939, 59 Turán medium tanks and 135 Nimród self-propelled guns in 1940-1941, and 6 Zrínyi assault guns in 1944. The company was also involved in the production of road vehicles: until 1944, 1,337 Botond all-terrain vehicles, 1,853 trucks of various LO types and bus chassis were produced.

As part of the Győr programme, the production of steam locomotives also increased: by 1944, 218 steam locomotives had been built, most of them 424s. Locomotive boilers were also made to German orders, but at that time the factory could not produce welded boilers of sufficient quality, so only 25 were delivered.

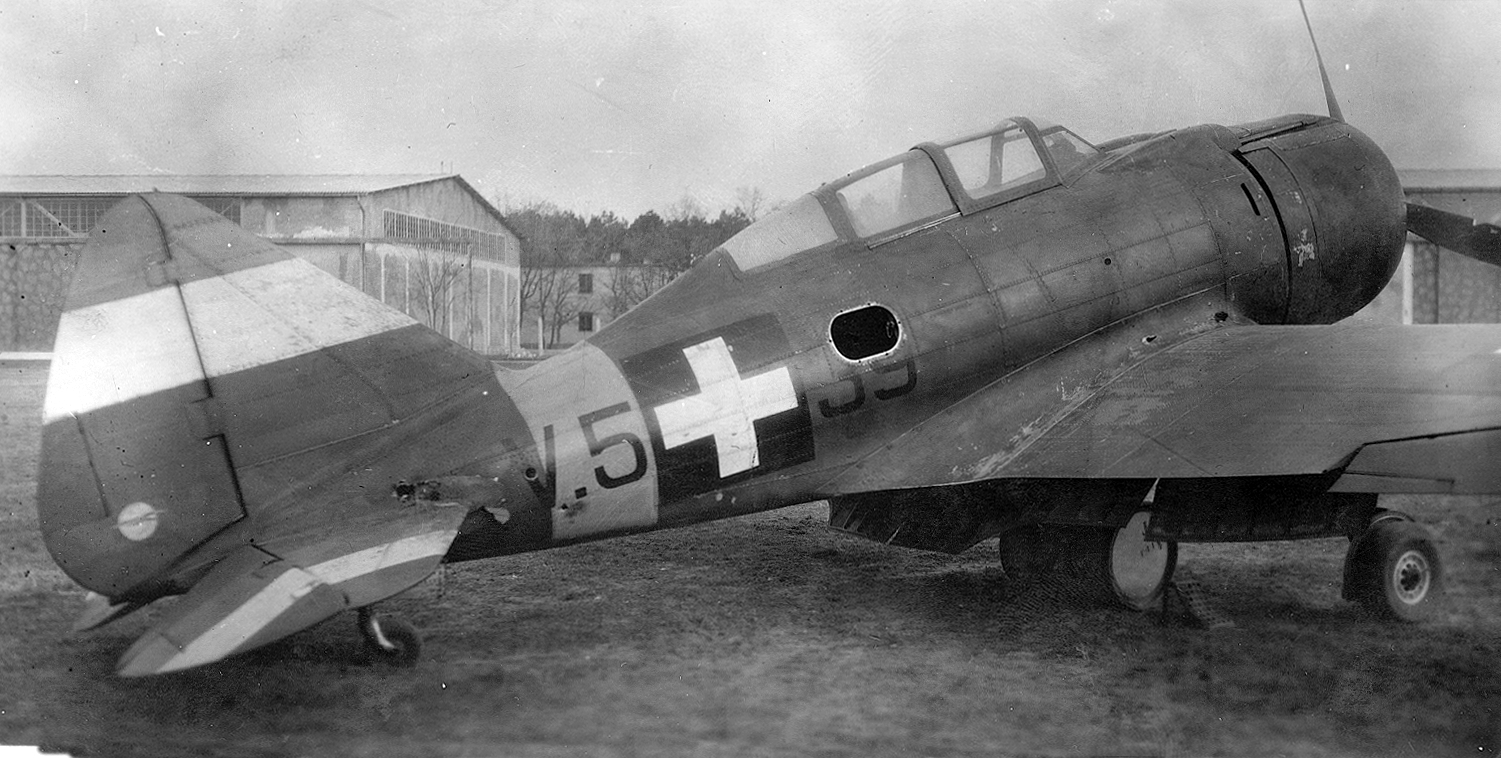
A Hungarian MÁVAG Héja II in 1944

The aircraft factory, established under István Horthy, started production in 1939, initially producing the WM-21 Sólyom and M-25 Nebuló, then the MÁVAG Héja from 1942 and Arado Ar 96 from 1943. The factory ceased production at the end of December 1944, during the Siege of Budapest.

At this time, the bridge department was responsible for the manufacture of the iron structures for the bridges on the newly built Szeretfalva-Déda railway line.

== Communist period ==
After the Second World War, Hungary had to pay substantial war reparations to the Soviet Union, Czechoslovakia and Yugoslavia. A significant part of this was the supply of railway rolling stock, under which MÁVAG delivered 525 locomotives and locomotive parts over a period of five years. This mainly involved the production of standard gauge locomotives No. 122 (the same as the 424 series) (or wide for the Soviet Union), standard gauge locomotives No. 110 (the same as the 375 series) and narrow gauge locomotives No. 70 (the same as the 490 series), but soon afterwards the production of the ЭР series No. 135 was started on the basis of Soviet designs. This became the largest type built by the factory: 1 350 units of the type were built, with the exception of five for the 'big brother'. After the completion of the reparation deliveries, production of the types produced up to that time resumed, now under commercial contracts. The КВ4 series of narrow-track locomotives were also built to Soviet designs.

The main task of the factory's bridge department was to rebuild bridges destroyed in the war.

The factory also made significant deliveries of road vehicles in the second half of the 1940s: 350 Tr5 (so-called "trambus") motor chassis, 95 N5 chassis and 162 B5 trucks. The agricultural machinery division supplied hundreds of T20 and T35 tractors. These products were later transferred centrally to other factories (Csepel Autó and the former Hofherr). Hundreds of locomotives were also produced for the Soviet Union, partly as reparations and partly under commercial contracts.

During this period, the needs of MÁV were very much behind. Work began during the war, but it was not until 1951 that the last locomotive of the factory's own design was built, the heavy high-speed locomotive No. 130, which was given the serial number 303 by MÁV. Locomotive No. 303,001 was MÁVAG's 6000th factory locomotive. Only 2 of this type were built, while the 1'E axle layout freight locomotives and 2'D2' axle layout local passenger locomotives based on the 424 series boiler, as well as a E axle layout shunting steam locomotive, were not built at all, on the grounds that they had to be replaced by diesel locomotives. This decision may be considered premature in today's terms, as the development of diesel and electric locomotives was very slow and this caused a serious shortage of traction vehicles at MÁV by the 1960s.

MÁV was only able to obtain new steam locomotives in significant quantities from 1955 onwards, and these were the long-established 424 and 375 series steam locomotives. The production of the former type was completed in 1958, while the last steam locomotive produced in Hungary, No. 7578, No. 375,1032, left the factory in March 1959, under a new name and organisation (see below).

The factory's first post-war electric locomotive was a five-axle phase and frequency converter locomotive, factory type VM10, of which 12 were built between 1950 and 1957. Mainly due to the backwardness of the back-engineering industry, they were built with a constant delay and operated with low reliability.

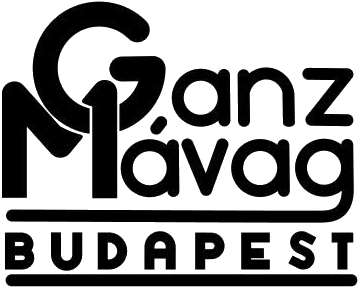
Logo of Ganz-Mávag, the company formed in 1959 after the merger

A type programme was developed for the design of diesel locomotives. The first of the 600 hp, heavy shunting and light line diesel-electric locomotives of the DVM2 factory type was completed in cooperation with the Ganz factory by the end of 1954 and was given the track number M424,5001 at MÁV. This type was produced from 195 onwards under the serial number M44 and was a great success. The first of the 450 hp diesel-hydraulic shunting locomotives, designated DHM1, was completed for the Egyptian railways in 1957. This type initially caused a lot of headaches and even a loss of prestige for the two factories because of the diesel engines' faults. Even worse was the only heavy main line locomotive, the M601 series, also built in 1957, which was never put into series production because of the diesel engine.

Since the industrial policy of the time decided to discontinue steam locomotive production and to develop diesel locomotive production vigorously, it did not seem advisable to operate the MÁVAG plant, which produced the vehicle structure, and the Ganz plant, which had been nationalised in the meantime and was responsible for the mechanical equipment, as separate entities, and thus to merge the two plants, which were already located in close proximity to each other: thus, from 1 January 1959, the two plants continued to operate as one company under the name Ganz-MÁVAG Locomotive, Wagon and Machine Works.

== Names of the company ==
- 1870: Hungarian Royal State Railways Machine and Trolley
- 1873: Machine Factory of Hungarian Royal Railways (hereafter MÁV Machine Factory)
- 1902: Hungarian Royal State Ironworks
- 1925: Hungarian Royal State Iron, Steel and Machinery Factory (hereafter: MÁVAG)
- 1943: Vitéz Horthy István Hungarian Royal State Iron, Steel and Machine Factory
- 1945: Hungarian State Iron, Steel and Machine Factory
- 1949: MÁVAG Locomotive and Machine Factory
- 1959: Ganz-MÁVAG Locomotive—Wagon and Machine Factory (1988)
