= Hovione =

Pharmaceutical company

- Company type: Private
- Founded: 1959
- Key people: Jean-Luc Herbeaux (CEO); Diane Villax (Founder-Non-Executive Board Member); Stefan Doboczky (Chairman); Guy Villax (Non-Executive Board Member)
- Products: Pharmaceutical Fine Chemicals; Off-Patent APIs; Inhalation; Dry Powder inhalers
- Services: Contract Manufacturing Services; Drug Substance; Particle Engineering; Drug Product; Drug Product Intermediate; Drug Product Formulation; Drug Product Inhalation; Continuous Tableting
- Number of employees: 2000 (2022)
- Website: www.hovione.com

Hovione is a Contract Development and Manufacturing Organization (CDMO) with services for drug substance, drug product intermediate and drug product. The company has four FDA inspected sites in the United States, Portugal, Ireland and China development laboratories in Lisbon, Portugal and New Jersey, USA. Hovione is also present in the inhalation area, and provides a complete range of services, from active pharmaceutical ingredients (APIs), formulation development and devices. Hovione was the first Chemical/ Pharmaceutical Company to become a Certified B Corporation (certification), is a member of Rx-360 and EFCG.

== History ==
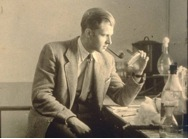
Ivan Villax - 1950

Hovione was established in Portugal in 1959 by Ivan Villax with his wife, Diane Villax, and two other Hungarian refugees: Nicholas de Horthy and Andrew Onody, the first two letters of the three founders’ names: HO, VI and ON were used to create the name Hovione.

Hovione continues to be a privately held company with 5 plants - in Portugal (1969), Macao (1986), and New Jersey (2001) expanded in 2016, Taizhou in mainland China (2008) and Cork, Ireland (2009) - have a total reactor capacity of 1300 m³ and 1100 people worldwide. Since Hovione started operations in 1959, the company has patented more than 100 innovative chemical processes and produced industrially over 45 different APIs. All Hovione sites have been successfully inspected either by the FDA, the European Medicines Agency or the PMDA Japanese agency.

Hovione is a major source of semi-synthetic tetracyclines and corticosteroids, and is the largest independent supplier of contrast agents – these three families of compounds make up most of its generic product portfolio. The other half of the business focuses on exclusive projects including the development of innovator APIs and particle engineering.

== Research and development ==
Hovione has two R&D centers with a team of over 270 scientists, one in Portugal - Loures and another one in its facilities in New Jersey. Hovione has international partnerships, including with Cambridge and MIT. In 2016, 7 PhDs were simultaneously running and it launched a scientific program named "9oW", which challenges scientific and academic communities to help overcome technological challenges. Also, Hovione is already the largest private employer of doctorates in Portugal (57 doctorates in Loures).

== Strategy ==
Hovione was present in the pharmaceutical industry offering products and services related to the development and manufacture of either a new chemical entity (NCE) for an exclusive contract manufacturing partner or an existing API for an off-patent product. In the area of technology, it has capabilities, among others, in spray drying, controlled crystallization, microfluidization, and continuous tabletting. Hovione invested about $100 million in 2017 and plans to spend as much again in 2019 and 2020. The plan over the next three years is to continue investing, especially in Portugal, where the firm will add 165 m^{3} of chemical synthesis capacity, a spray-dryer building, and a 1,200-m^{2} analytical lab.
