= MÁV Class 601 =

Class of Hungarian Mallet-type locomotives

MÁV class 601
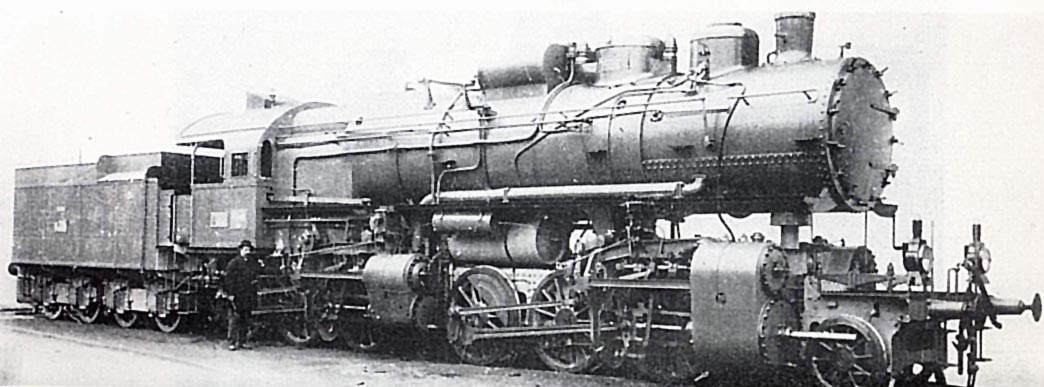
- MÁV 601
Type and origin
- Power type: Steam
- Builder: MÁVAG
- Build date: 1914–1921
- Total produced: 60
Specifications
- Configuration
  - Whyte: 2-6-6-0
  - UIC: (1′C)C
- Gauge: 1,435 mm (4 ft 8 1/2 in) standard gauge
- Leading dia.: 950 mm (37 3/8 in)
- Driver dia.: 1,440 mm (56 3/4 in)
- Axle load: 15.78 tonnes (15.53 long tons; 17.39 short tons)
- Loco weight: Empty: 99.8 tonnes (98.2 long tons; 110.0 short tons)
- Tender weight: 53.1 tonnes (52.3 long tons; 58.5 short tons)
- Total weight: In service: 163.32 tonnes (160.74 long tons; 180.03 short tons)
- Fuel type: Coal
- Fuel capacity: 8 tonnes (7.9 long tons; 8.8 short tons)
- Water cap.: 26 m^{3} (5,700 imp gal)
- Firebox
  - Grate area: 5.24 m^{2} (56.4 sq ft)
- Boiler pressure: 15.5 kg/cm^{2} (1.52 MPa; 220 psi)
- Heating surface: 252 m^{2} (2,710 sq ft)
- Superheater
  - Heating area: 87.3 m^{2} (940 sq ft)
- Cylinders: Four, compound, outside
- High-pressure cylinder: 520 mm × 660 mm (20 1/2 in × 26 in)
- Low-pressure cylinder: 800 mm × 660 mm (31 1/2 in × 26 in)
Performance figures
- Power output: Optimal: 1,550 hp (1,160 kW); Maximum: 2,950 hp (2,200 kW)
- Tractive effort: 218.76 kN (49,179.20 lbf)

The MÁV class 601 (nicknamed "The Giant" or "Big boy") was a class of Hungarian four-cylinder Mallet locomotives, which was designed to haul long and very heavy cargo on very steep railway tracks. At 22.5 m (73 ft 10 in) long and outputting 2,200 kW (3,000 hp), they were the largest and most powerful steam locomotives built in Europe before and during World War I.

Based on the good operating experience with the series 651, more powerful locomotives arose at the MÁVAG in Budapest from 1914 on, which were especially provided for the line from Karlstadt (today: Karlovac, Croatia) to Fiume (today: Rijeka). By utilisation of the permitted axial load of 16.5 t (16.2 long tons; 18.2 short tons) a locomotive was developed, which alone could move freight trains uphill even on the steep line in the Croatian karst without a banking engine.

Allowed train loads of Class 601 engines
Angle of elevation	15 km/h (9.3 mph)	20 km/h (12 mph)	25 km/h (16 mph)	30 km/h (19 mph)	40 km/h (25 mph)	45 km/h (28 mph)	50 km/h (31 mph)	60 km/h (37 mph)
0‰	5,950 t (5,860 long tons; 6,560 short tons)	5,550 t (5,460 long tons; 6,120 short tons)	5,057 t (4,977 long tons; 5,574 short tons)	4,650 t (4,580 long tons; 5,130 short tons)	3,770 t (3,710 long tons; 4,160 short tons)	3,160 t (3,110 long tons; 3,480 short tons)	2,610 t (2,570 long tons; 2,880 short tons)	1,825 t (1,796 long tons; 2,012 short tons)
5‰	1,860 t (1,830 long tons; 2,050 short tons)	1,817 t (1,788 long tons; 2,003 short tons)	1,760 t (1,730 long tons; 1,940 short tons)	1,697 t (1,670 long tons; 1,871 short tons)	1,550 t (1,530 long tons; 1,710 short tons)	1,370 t (1,350 long tons; 1,510 short tons)	1,187 t (1,168 long tons; 1,308 short tons)	910 t (900 long tons; 1,000 short tons)
10‰	1,052 t (1,035 long tons; 1,160 short tons)	1,035 t (1,019 long tons; 1,141 short tons)	1,013 tonnes (997 long tons; 1,117 short tons)	990 t (970 long tons; 1,090 short tons)	930 t (920 long tons; 1,030 short tons)	833 t (820 long tons; 918 short tons)	730 t (720 long tons; 800 short tons)	570 tonnes (560 long tons; 630 short tons)
16‰	657 t (647 long tons; 724 short tons)	650 t (640 long tons; 720 short tons)	640 t (630 long tons; 710 short tons)	628 t (618 long tons; 692 short tons)	600 t (590 long tons; 660 short tons)	538 t (530 long tons; 593 short tons)	471 t (464 long tons; 519 short tons)	369 t (363 long tons; 407 short tons)
20‰	511 t (503 long tons; 563 short tons)	506 t (498 long tons; 558 short tons)	500 t (490 long tons; 550 short tons)	491 t (483 long tons; 541 short tons)	472 t (465 long tons; 520 short tons)	423 t (416 long tons; 466 short tons)	369 t (363 long tons; 407 short tons)	287 t (282 long tons; 316 short tons)
25‰	389 t (383 long tons; 429 short tons)	385 t (379 long tons; 424 short tons)	381 t (375 long tons; 420 short tons)	375 t (369 long tons; 413 short tons)	362 t (356 long tons; 399 short tons)	323 t (318 long tons; 356 short tons)	280 t (280 long tons; 310 short tons)	215 t (212 long tons; 237 short tons)

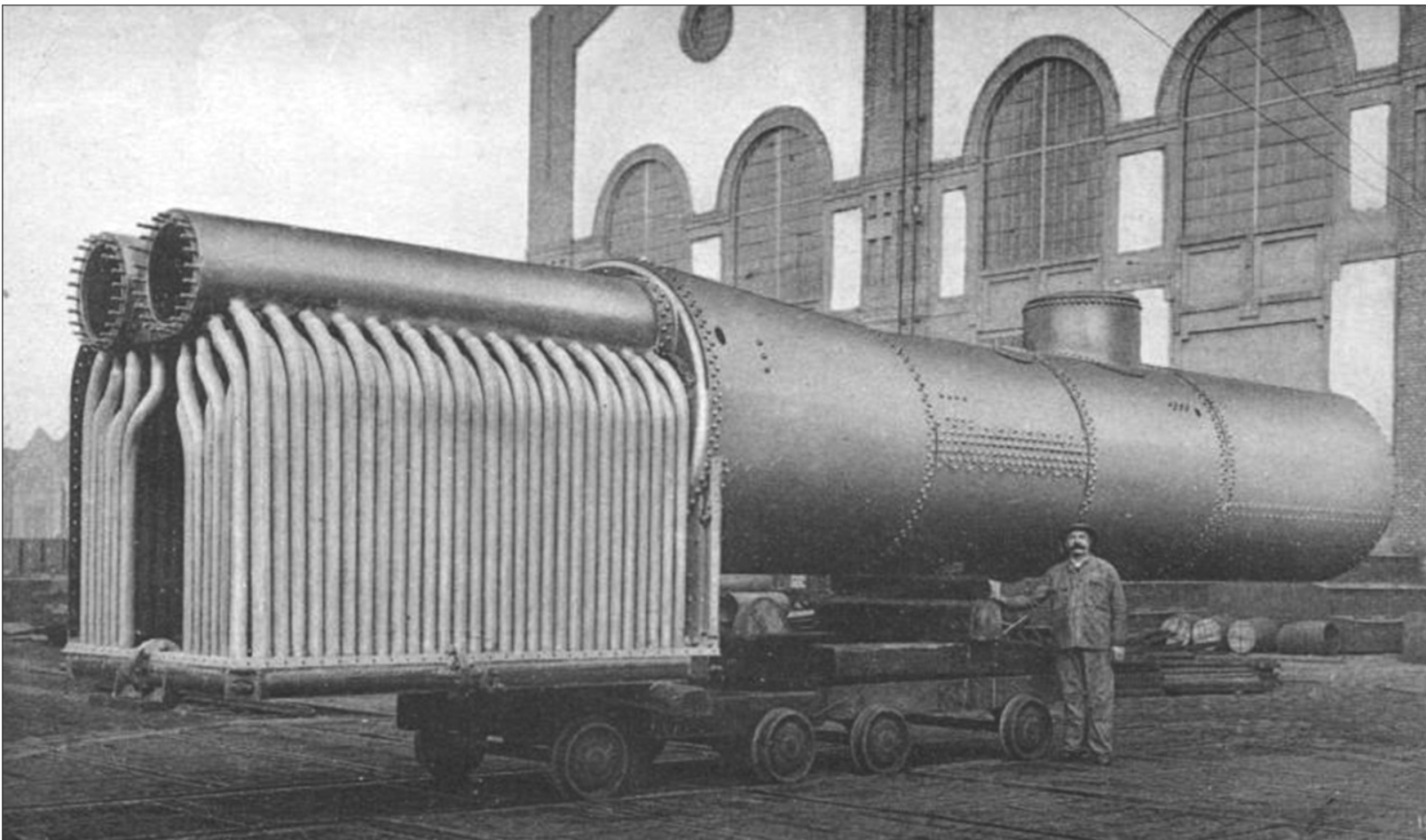
Boiler view

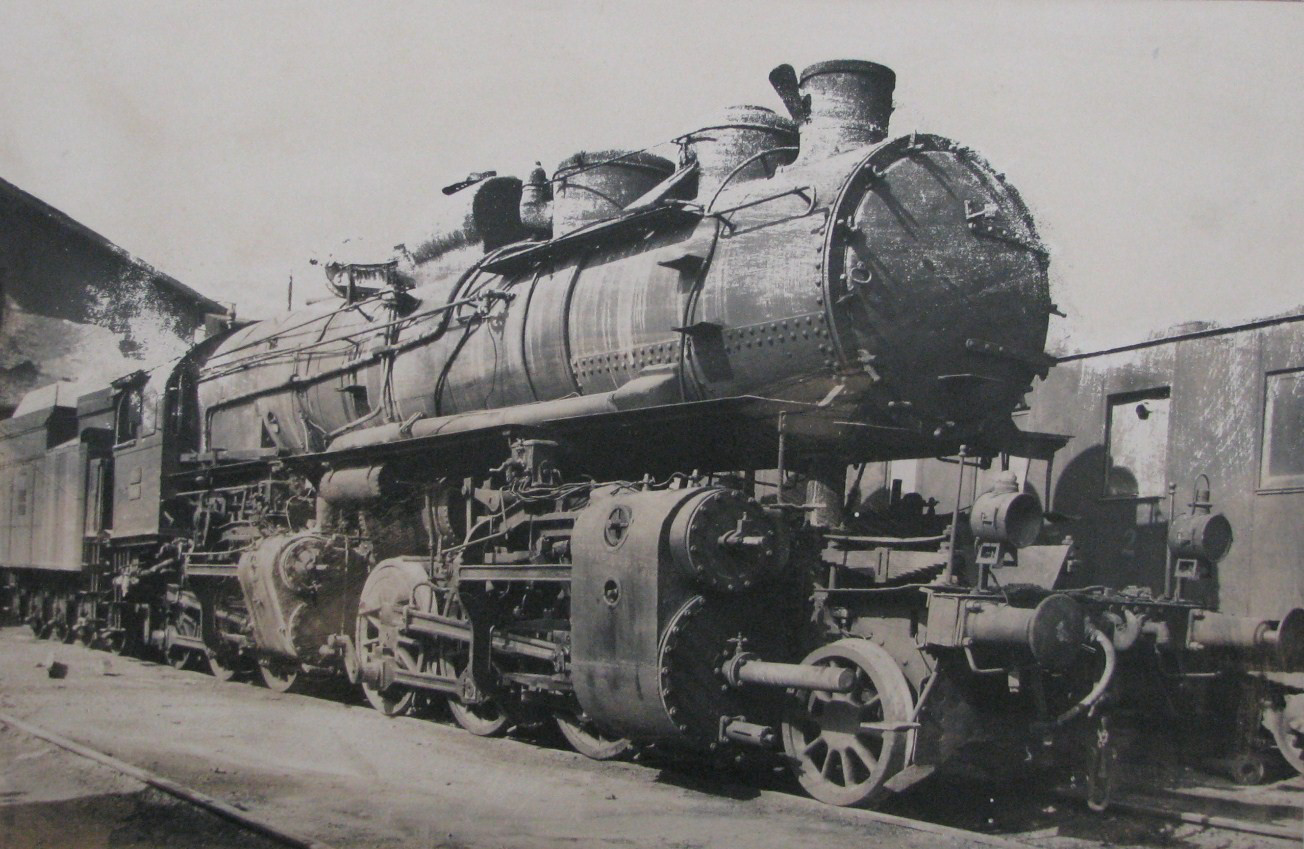
In service

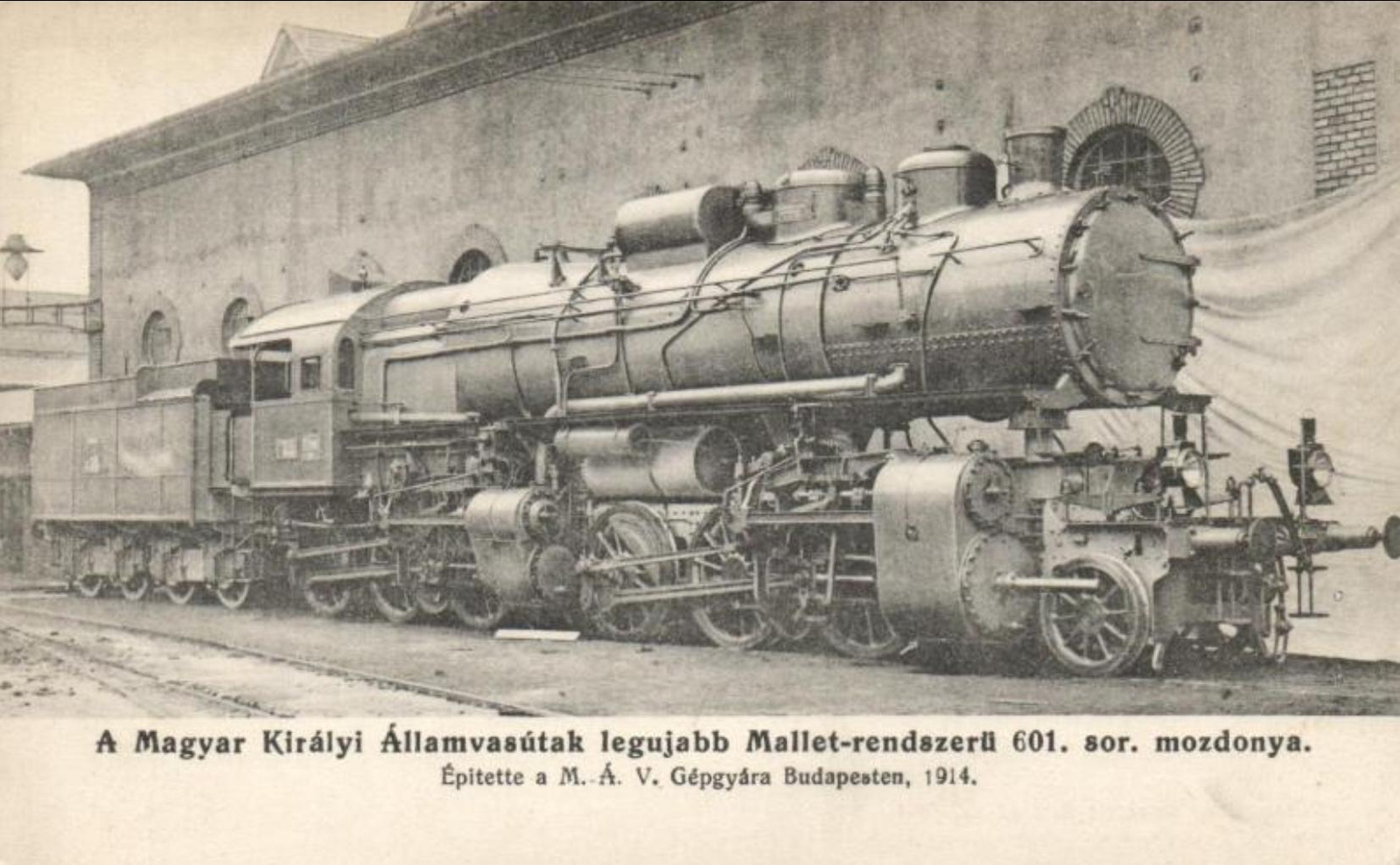
MÁV Class 601 engine in 1914

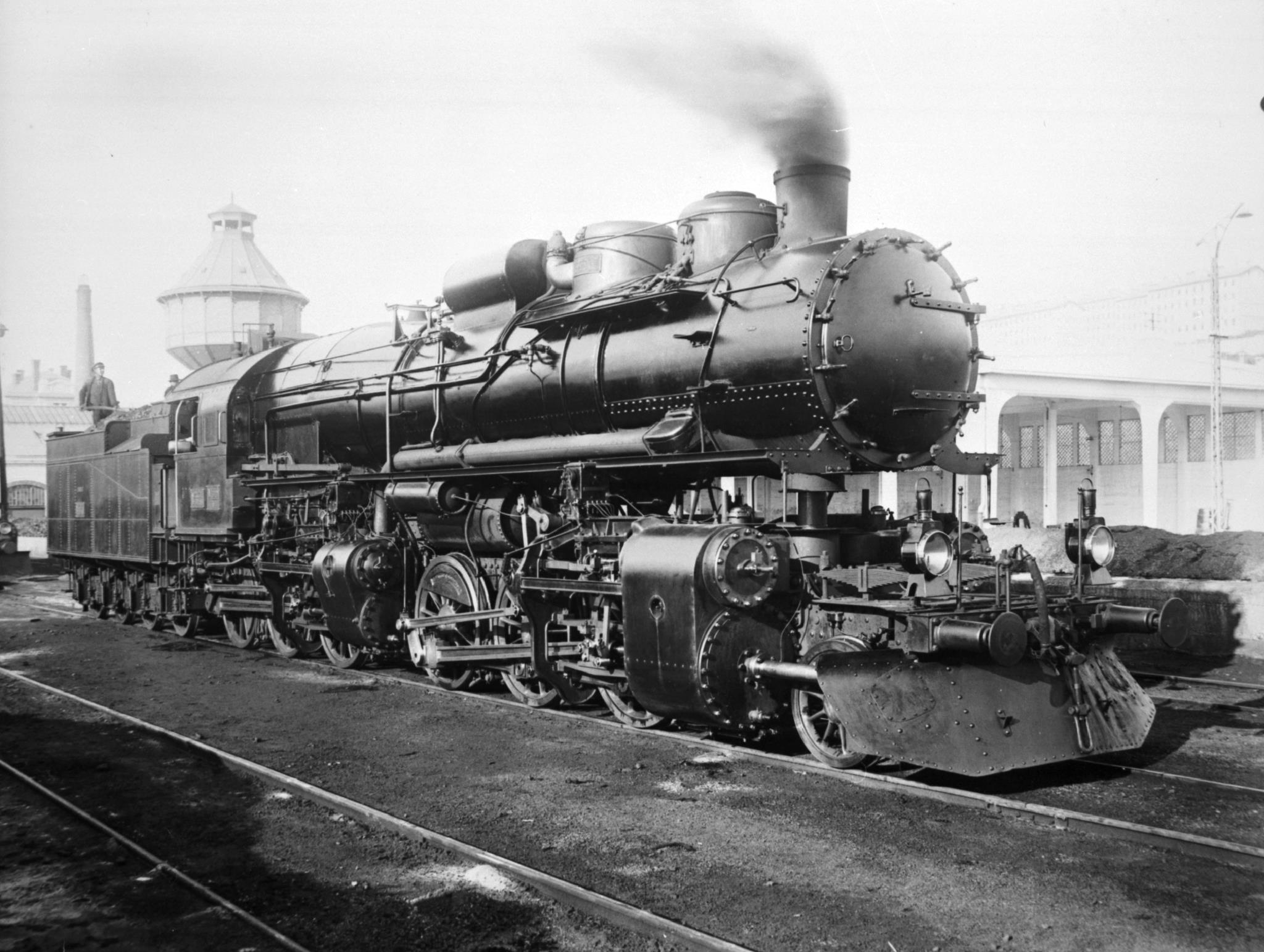
MÁV 601

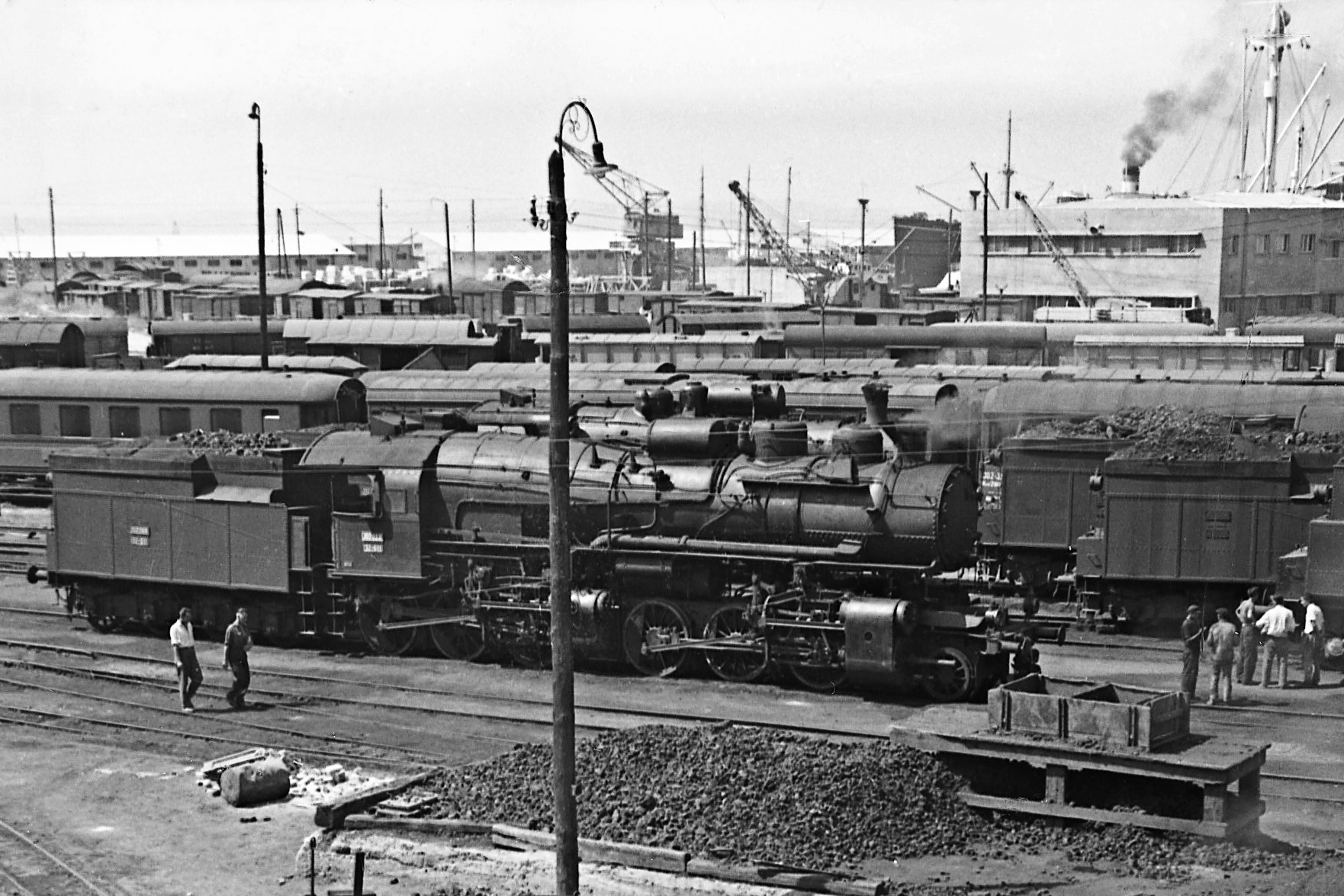
JZ. series 32 in Split, 1952

== Frame and chassis ==
The required traction power required a very large boiler, so an additional running wheel was placed in front of the six coupled bikes. The coupled bikes were therefore mounted in triplicate in a separate frame in accordance with the Mallet system, while the running wheel was mounted in the front frame as an Adams-Webb type axle with a lateral offset of 42–42 mm. In addition, the rear (driving) wheel of the front frame (i.e. the locomotive's fourth wheel) was turned thinner, and the front (locomotive's fifth) wheel of the rear frame was allowed to move laterally by 12–12 mm. The driven axles were made of 3% nickel steel, while the coupled and running axles were made of liquid steel. The axles of driven and coupled bicycles were completely drilled along the axle line. The suspension of the driven wheels, which were riveted together from 28 mm thick solid iron plates and embedded in an internally arranged frame, was connected by dowels. The first, second and fifth wheels were also fitted with tyre lubricators. The two parts of the frame were connected by the so-called Mallet pin. The complete boiler was mounted on the rear frame - the rear frame extended forward over the front frame to support the front of the boiler - and the cab (in the parlance of the time, the 'locomotive galley'). The extension of the rear frame section rested on the front frame section via a sliding plate. The front frame section could pivot laterally around the Mallet pin, and the straightening and 'anti-snaking' was provided by plate springs.

Wheel arrangement (Jelleg): (1'C)'C–h4v

Service mass with tender : 163.32 / 162.5 metric tons

Total wheelbase with tender : 19,182 mm

== Engine ==
The rear frame wheels were driven by high-pressure cylinders and the front by low-pressure cylinders. The steam from the high-pressure cylinders was discharged through the cross-flow tube into the common flow tube, which also served as a receiver, and was fitted with a ball joint at the rear. From the transfer hose, the steam was discharged into the piston chambers of the low pressure cylinders. In each frame, the rear of the nickel-steel rims was the actuator. The right-hand cranks were wedged 90° forward on the wheel axle compared to the left-hand cranks. The piston rod was not a through rod on the rear, only on the front. The piston rod sleeves at the rear of each machine had a Schmidt-type metal seal, while the front of the front machine had a closed bushing. The crossheads were two-wire. The drive and coupling rods were of I-shaped cross-section.

To reduce the idling work (resistance) of the steam cylinders, an openable pressure compensating switch connecting the front and rear piston areas of the cylinders and, in the first examples, a Ricour valve on the inlet were fitted, and in later examples air valves were fitted to the piston boxes of the high-pressure cylinders. A compression valve was also fitted to all four cylinders to prevent water hammer. The crossheads were two-wire. In order to facilitate starting, the locomotives were also fitted with a starter, identical in principle to the Borries starter but without a non-return valve, to supply fresh steam to all four cylinders. The steam cylinders were equipped with wide, flexible, self-tensioning cylindrical pushrods with internal inlet, controlled by counter-cranking Heusinger-Walschaert-type camshafts. The high-pressure pistons had a 354 mm diameter, 40 mm internal overlap and 7 mm negative external overlap, while the low-pressure pistons had a 430 mm diameter, 39 mm internal overlap and 4 mm negative external overlap.

The counter crank was located nearly 90° ahead of the crank in the forward stroke, essentially it was wedged as a leading edge in relation to the crank. In accordance with this and the internal inlet, the swinging arch stone was positioned on the upper part of the swinging arch (coulisse) in the forward direction. This arrangement, common on domestic locomotives of the period, is not an advantageous solution for locomotives running predominantly in forward gear, as it causes faster wear of the swinging arch bedding. The steering drawbar, which moved forward when the locomotive was moving forward, was connected to the main spar behind the high-pressure cylinders via the steering lever. Also connected to this strut, by means of an intermediate connecting rod, was the front control linkage trailing arm. The main spar was also connected to the rear control units by separate tie rods on either side. This latter solution was necessary because the large standing boiler prevented the main beam from being positioned at the rear control units.

== Boiler ==
The locomotive's boiler, based on the experience with the types already mentioned, was built with a Brotan-Deffner type water tube boiler and, in keeping with the times, a Schmidt type superheater. The relatively small diameter of the wheels and the high position of the longitudinal boiler made it possible to have a wide standing boiler and thus a wide grate. Due to the height restrictions of the locomotive, the so-called front head consisted of two parallel cylinders, into which the 70 Brotan 85/95 mm pipes, which formed the side of the firebox, ran. At the time of its construction, the steam boilers of MÁV's 601 series locomotives were the largest Brotan boilers in Europe in terms of size and power. The grate consisted of three parts, the first part was hinged. The longitudinal boiler consisted of three belts, the steam dome being located on the first belt and the Pecz-Rejtő feedwater purifiers on the second: two six-cell cylindrical units arranged in parallel under a common casing. The steam dome houses the water separator and the double flat-piston steam regulator with a vertical pusher. The control rod of the structure was routed inside the boiler. The third boiler belt was tapered to connect to the preheaters and the stationary boiler. The boiler was fitted with 188 continuous flues of 46.5/52 mm diameter and a total of 36 continuous flues of 119/127 mm diameter in four rows. The smoke tubes were fitted with superheater elements consisting of 27/34 mm diameter tubes. The American system spark arrestor and the superheater cabinet were installed in the 2892 mm long fume cupboard. The superheating was controlled by means of a superheater protection cabinet and dampers mounted on it, which were moved by a small steam cylinder (the so-called servomotor or automatic).

On the first locomotive, the boiler shell was tightly fitted over the Brotan tubes and the front end, so that after the tapered longitudinal boiler tube there was a break in the outer line of the boiler. In later examples, the standing boiler shell was already fitted to the upper arc of the longitudinal boiler and later the first locomotive was also so designed. The boiler was also fitted with three 4″ MÁV-style[4] direct spring-loaded safety valves and a so-called smoke evacuator. The boiler was fed with water bytwo Friedmann class SZ non-intake, 11 mm orifice, so-called "restarting" fresh steam guns.

=== Boiler specifications ===
Type of stationary boiler: Brotan–Deffner system, water-tube firebox

Height of boiler longitudinal axis above rail crown: 3120 mm

Steam pressure: 15 bar

Fire Tubes Number: 188 / 176

Inner/outer diameter: 46.5 mm / 52 mm

Length: 5600 mm

Flue Tubes Number: 52 / 36

Heating Surfaces Grate area: 5.09 / 5.24 m²

Radiant heating surface: 23 / 25.7 m²

Tube heating surface: 252 / 221 m²

Superheater area: 66 / 87.3 m²

Performance Effective steam production capacity: 12,750 kg/h

== Supporting equipment ==
The dome-shaped sandbox was placed on the locomotive's smoke box, behind the chimney. The sanding device delivered sand in front of the second, third and fourth wheels.

The locomotive was fitted with one Westinghouse-type brake cylinder per frame and was also fitted with a direct-acting regulating brake for use on longer gradients. The brake shoes braked the locomotive's driven wheels from the front, while the running wheels were unbraked as was usual on MÁV locomotives. The brake shoe pressure was almost equal to the traction weight. To ensure safe running on high gradients, the locomotive was also equipped with a Le Chatelier-type back-steam device. The parts in the steam were lubricated by a 10-slot Friedmann LD piston hot parts lubrication pump per frame. In unfavourable adhesion conditions, a compressed air sand blaster was used to apply sand to the coupled rims of the front frame. For sanding the rear wheel set, a second, smaller sand tank was installed at the driver's position. The locomotives were also equipped with an acetylene generator and a Bavarian system of high-pressure steam heating.

== Production data ==
The first two examples of the Class 601 steam locomotives were completed by 1914. Soon afterward, an additional 18 units were ordered, followed by a further 40. By the end of the war, 57 units of this type had been produced by the MÁVAG Company for the MÁV (Hungarian State Railways).

A 601 Manufacturing data
Engine number	Tender number	Road number	Manufacturing year
105${}^{1}$	32${}^{7}$	601,001–002	1914
105${}^{2}$	32${}^{9}$	601,003–014; 601,015–028; 601,029–030	1915; 1916; 1917
105${}^{3}$	32${}^{10}$	601,031–046; 601,047; CO 601–603; 601,048–057; 601,058–060	1917; 1918; 1918; 1918; 1921

In the locomotives’ boilers, the number of fire tubes and flues was modified, along with the diameter of the latter. The design of the cylinder castings was also altered, resulting in changes to the diameter of the low-pressure cylinders. Starting with road number 601,015, Stein-type water separators were installed in the locomotives. The unit price of the locomotives ranged from 191,185 to 246,222 crowns, depending on their equipment. In 1918, three such locomotives were built for the Chemins de fer Orientaux (CO) in Turkey, where they were assigned road numbers 601–603. MÁV stationed the majority of the Class 601 locomotives in Zagreb and a smaller number in Miskolc. During World War I, MÁV could not obtain high-ignition-point cylinder oils. Consequently, the piston valves of the Class 601 locomotives were redesigned to a narrow-ring type with reduced friction. This modification was integrated by MÁV with the standardization of piston valve dimensions across its superheated locomotives. As part of this process, the piston valve diameters and overlap values of the Class 601 locomotives remained unchanged.

From 1918 onward, MÁV reorganized the major overhauls of its locomotives, allocating them not by geographic region but by locomotive type. The Zagreb Workshop was designated for major overhauls of the Class 601 locomotives.

== After World War I ==
Following the loss in World War I, all previously built Class 601 locomotives ended up beyond Hungary's borders due to the redistribution of railway vehicles. These included locomotives stranded in severed territories, those seized during the Romanian occupation after the fall of the Hungarian Soviet Republic, and those assigned to successor states under the Treaty of Trianon. The distribution of the locomotives was as follows:

CFR (Romania): 15 units

ČSD (Czechoslovakia): 6 units

SHS (Yugoslavia): 36 units

=== Romania ===
The CFR continued operating the locomotives under their original MÁV class designation and road numbers. Their home depots were Petroșani and Brașov. In Romania, the Class 601 locomotives remained the largest and most powerful steam locomotives. They hauled heavy freight trains on steeply graded lines such as Pui–Petroșani and Brașov–Predeal.

=== Czechoslovakia ===
The ČSD initially retained the original class and road numbers. After the permanent division of the Austro-Hungarian railway fleet in 1925, a new numbering system was introduced. The locomotives and their tenders were assigned separate designations: locomotives became 636.001–06, and tenders 526.001–06.

=== Yugoslavia ===
At the JDŽ (Yugoslav Railways), the locomotives were renumbered to 32-001–036 starting in 1933.

=== Hungary ===
Post-Trianon Hungary retained only three locomotives (road numbers 601.058–060), completed in 1920–1921. These were stationed at the Budapest-Ferencváros depot and hauled heavy coal trains from the Felsőgalla coal basin alongside two Class 402 locomotives. A planned renumbering to 601.751–753 in 1926 was never implemented.

To reduce significant boiler scale deposits on the lower fire tube sheets, the number of fire tubes was reduced from 180 to 167 during boiler renovations by removing the lower rows.

=== "Repatriated" locomotives ===
MÁV’s locomotive fleet, including the Class 601, expanded significantly after the Vienna Awards. Six locomotives were reclaimed from ČSD and one from CFR, all reinstated with their original road numbers.

== After World War II ==
From the postwar fleet of 10 locomotives, two were returned to CFR. However, locomotive 601.012 (renumbered 601.061) remained with MÁV. By the 1950s, these locomotives were rarely used, mostly sidelined as reserve units or relegated to boiler heating duty until their certificates expired. The last active example operated until 1954. MÁV scrapped its remaining eight Class 601 locomotives in 1958. In Romania, the locomotives served until 1955, with the last unit scrapped at Petroșani depot in 1960.

Not a single example of these locomotives has survived for posterity, leaving only photographs to commemorate MÁV’s mightiest steam locomotive series — a class that ranked among the largest in Europe and was affectionately nicknamed the 'Gigant' in its homeland."
