= István Horthy =

Hungarian politician and fighter pilot (1904–1942)

Vitéz István Horthy de Nagybánya
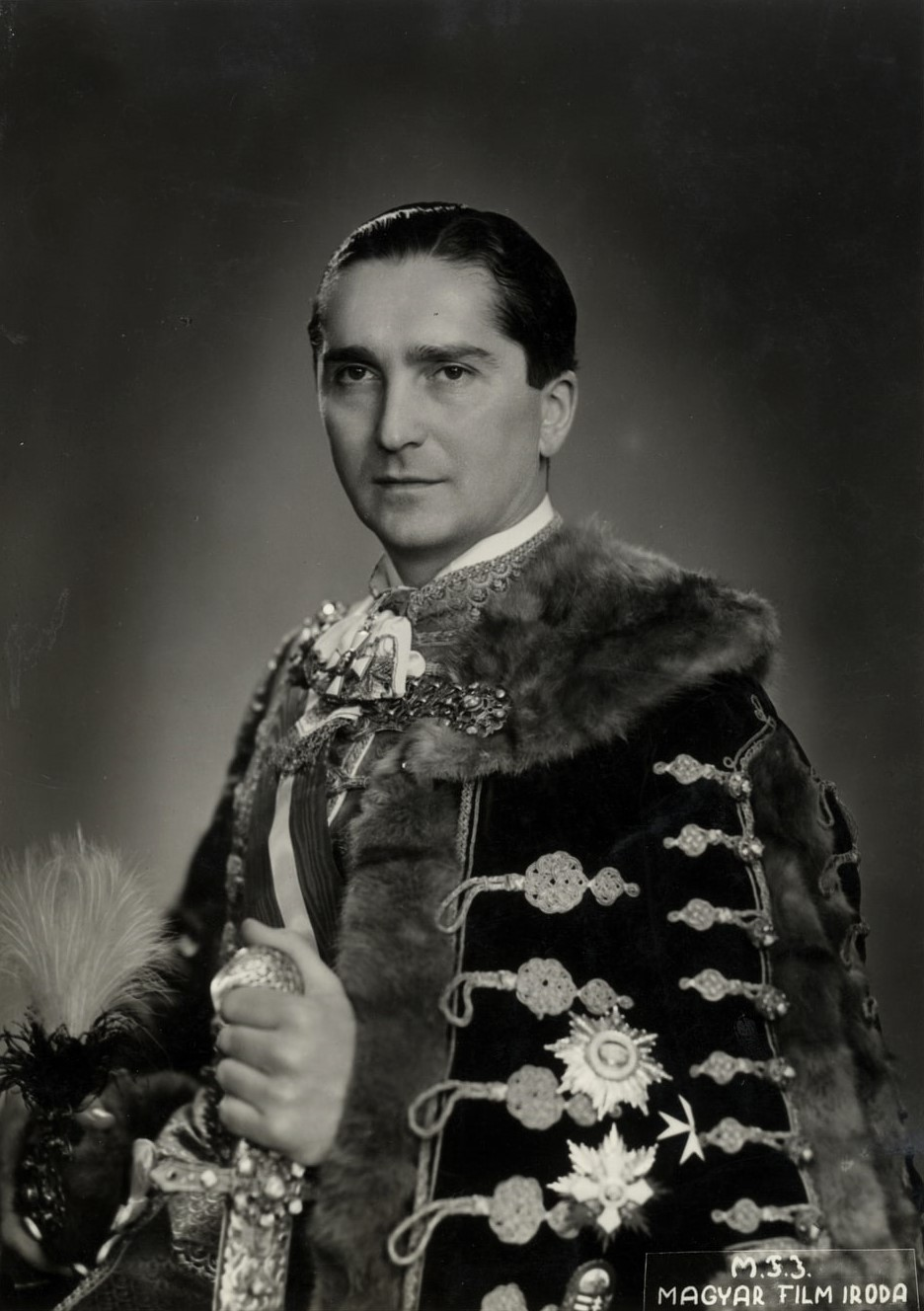
- Horthy in 1942

Vice-Regent of Hungary
- In office 19 February 1942 – 20 August 1942
- Monarch: Vacant
- Regent: Miklós Horthy
- Preceded by: Office established
- Succeeded by: Office abolished

Personal details
- Born: István Horthy de Nagybánya; 9 December 1904 Pola, Austria-Hungary (now Croatia)
- Died: 20 August 1942 (aged 37) Alexeyevsky District, Russian SFSR, Soviet Union
- Party: Independent
- Spouse: Ilona Edelsheim-Gyulai (m. 1940)
- Children: István Horthy Jr.
- Parents: Miklós Horthy; Magdolna Purgly

István Horthy de Nagybánya (9 December 1904 – 20 August 1942) was a Hungarian politician and fighter pilot during World War II. He was briefly Vice-Regent of Hungary in 1942, and was the eldest son of Hungarian regent Miklós Horthy.

== Early life ==
In his youth, István Horthy and his younger brother Miklós Jr. were active members of a Catholic Scout troop of the Magyar Cserkészszövetség (Hungarian Scout Association), even though he was a Protestant. Horthy graduated as a mechanical engineer in 1928. He went to the United States for one year and worked in the Ford factory in Detroit, Michigan.

== Career ==
Returning to the Kingdom of Hungary, he worked in MÁVAG's locomotive factory as a mechanical engineer. On the forefront of the designer team, he took part in the development of many great projects, such as the Class 424. Between 1934 and 1938, Horthy was director of the company and after 1938 he became its general manager. In 1940, he married Countess Ilona Edelsheim-Gyulai.

István was pro-Western, and he strenuously confronted Nazism, often making his criticism public, despite Hungary being a part of the Axis. In January 1942, he had been elected Deputy Regent, and for some time, the "small regent" enjoyed massive popularity in Hungary. Shortly thereafter, István was sent to the Eastern Front. His humanity, and his disagreement in the "Jewish question" appears even here, too – a quote from one of his letters, which he sent to his father from Kiev, Soviet Ukraine: "[...] Yet another sad topic: the Jewish companies, as I hear, -there 20 or 30,000 [men]-, are at the mercy of the sadist's passions, in every regard; the stomach of man gets ache [looking at this]; it is abhorrent, that in the 20th century, it happens at us, too... [...] I fear, we will pay for this very dearly once. (Is it possible to take them home to work there?) Otherwise, in spring, only a few will be alive. [...]"

== Death ==
István Horthy died in a much-publicized flying accident in Russia on 20 August 1942 (18 August, according to other authors), He was then serving in the Royal Hungarian Air Force (Magyar Királyi Honvéd Légierő), MKHL, with the rank of 1/Lt, as a fighter pilot. His unit, 1/3 Fighter Squadron, was supporting the Hungarian Second Army against Soviet forces. He was flying his MÁVAG Héja I ("Hawk I"), V.421, a Hungarian fighter based on the Italian Reggiane Re.2000 Falco I. During his 25th operational sortie, soon after takeoff from an airfield near Ilovskoye, the other pilot flying with him asked Horthy to increase his altitude. István pulled up rapidly. His aircraft (which had become much more prone to stalls after a steel plate was added behind the cockpit of all Héja Is to protect pilots, but shifting the plane's center of gravity) stalled and crashed. Tragically, the order recalling him from the front had arrived the previous day, but he kept it secret from his comrades According to other sources, his aircraft entered a flat spin after he made a turn at low speed to fly in close formation with a He 46 reconnaissance aircraft. Some were convinced that the Germans had sabotaged his aircraft.

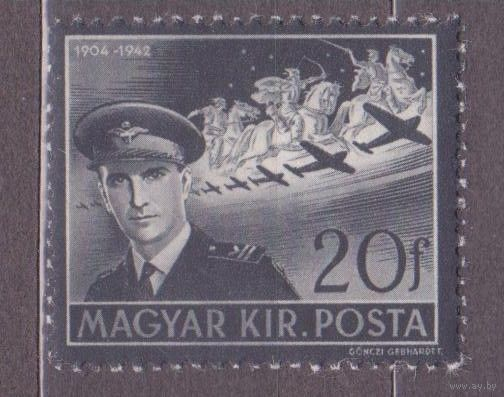
A 20 Fillér commemorative stamp honoring the death of István Horthy

Horthy's remains were repatriated to Hungary, with his funeral being held at the Hungarian Parliament Building on 27 August. He was then interred in the Horthy family crypt at Kenderes.

His only son, Sharif István Horthy, is a physicist and architect.

== Honors ==
István Horthy was awarded the Order of Vitéz. Hungary honored him by issuing a commemorative postage-stamp on 15 October 1942.
