= Ilona Edelsheim-Gyulai =

Hungarian noblewoman (1918–2013)

- Born: 14 January 1918; Budapest, Austria-Hungary
- Died: 18 April 2013 (aged 95); Lewes, East Sussex, England
- Spouse(s): István Horthy (m. 1940; died 1942) John Bowden (m. 1954; died 2002)
- Children: István Jr.

Countess Ilona Edelsheim-Gyulai de Marosnémethi et Nádaska (14 January 1918 – 18 April 2013) was a Hungarian noblewoman and wife of István Horthy, son of Regent Miklós Horthy and Deputy Regent of Hungary for a short time in 1942.

== Biography ==
She was born in Budapest, Austria-Hungary, the third daughter of Count Lipót Edelsheim-Gyulai and Gabriella Pejacsevich (Croatian: Gabriela Pejačević). She spent her childhood in Felsőelefánt (today: Horné Lefantovce, Slovakia), the family's estate in the former Upper Hungary, though during her early life it was part of Czechoslovakia. She married István Horthy in April 1940. Their only son, István Horthy Jr. was born in 1941. Her husband died in an unexplained airplane crash over the Eastern Front in August 1942. In 1954 she married Colonel John Wallace Guy Bowden of the Queen's Own Hussars; during the early 1960s they lived in Baghdad, Iraq, where Bowden was a British military attaché, and in the mid 60's they moved to Portugal. Bowden died in 2002.

She worked as a nurse for the Red Cross during World War II. She also had a role in rescuing Jews. After the unsuccessful desertion attempts and Operation Panzerfaust, she emigrated with her father-in-law, the Regent. She wrote her memoir with the title of Becsület és kötelesség ("Honor and Duty"). She lived in England until her death in Lewes, East Sussex, aged 95.

== Works ==
- Honour and duty: the memoirs of Countess Ilona Edelsheim Gyulai, widow of Stephen Horthy, vice-regent of Hungary (2005)
