= Miklós Horthy Jr. =

Hungarian politician and noble (1907–1993)

Vitéz Miklós Horthy de Nagybánya
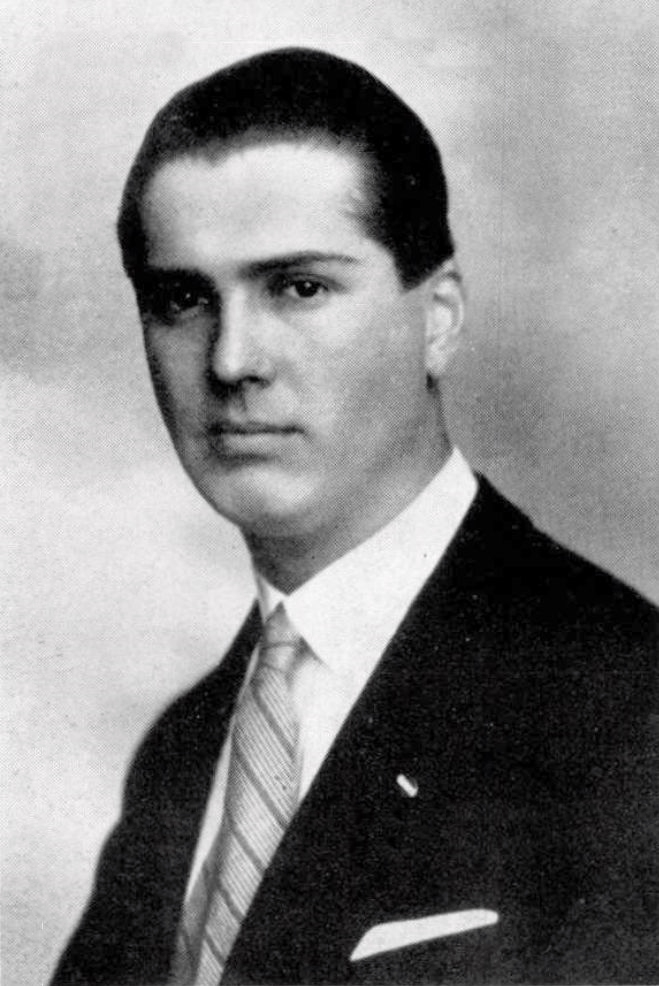
- Horthy in 1935

Personal details
- Born: Miklós László János Benedek Horthy de Nagybánya; 14 February 1907 Pola, Austria-Hungary
- Died: 28 March 1993 (aged 86) Estoril, Portugal
- Children: 2
- Parents: Miklós Horthy; Magdolna Purgly

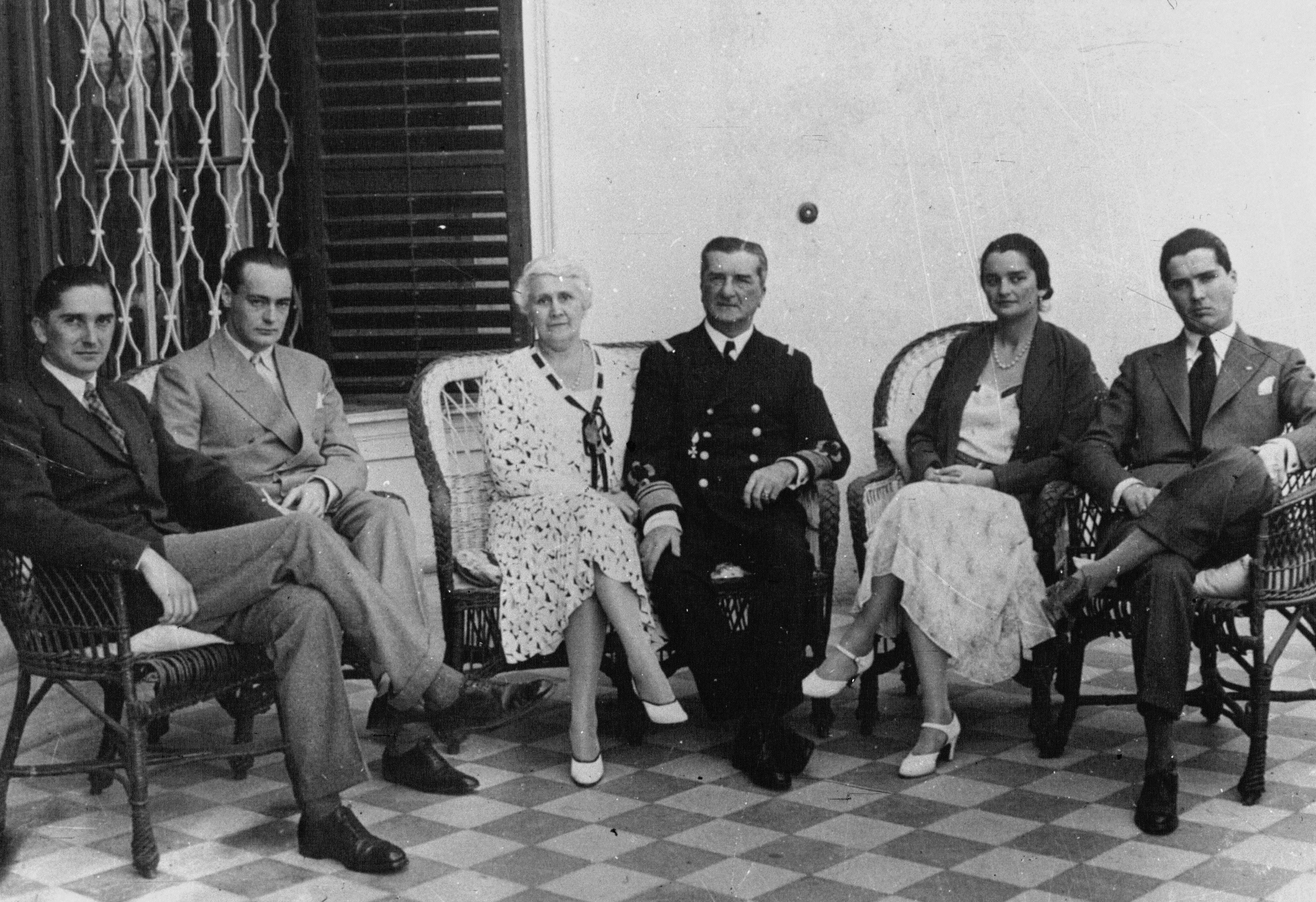
The Horthy family in 1936: István Horthy, Gyula Károlyi, Magdolna and Miklós Horthy, Paulette Horthy, Miklós Horthy Jr.

Miklós Horthy de Nagybánya II (Hungarian: Horthy Miklós László János Benedek; Hungarian pronunciation: [ˈhorti ˈmikloːʃ ˈlaːsloː ˈjaːnoʃ ˈbɛnɛdɛk]; 14 February 1907 – 28 March 1993) was the younger son of Hungarian regent Admiral Miklós Horthy and, until the end of World War II, a politician.

== Early life ==
In his youth, Miklós Horthy Jr. and his older brother, István, were active members of a Roman Catholic Scout troop of the Hungarian Scout Association (Magyar Cserkészszövetség), although they were both Protestant.

== Career ==
For a time, Miklós Jr. was the Hungarian ambassador to Brazil.

After the death of István in 1942, Miklós Jr. became more powerful in his father's government and supported his efforts to end the involvement of the Kingdom of Hungary with the Axis powers. But on October 15, 1944, Nazi Germany launched Operation Panzerfaust. As part of this operation, Miklós Jr. was kidnapped by German commandos led by Otto Skorzeny, and threatened with death unless his father resigned and agreed to appoint the Arrow Cross Party as the new government. His father complied, and Horthy Jr. survived the war (he became the only one of Horthy’s four children to outlive their father).

While his father was placed under house arrest in Bavaria, the younger Miklós was sent to the Dachau concentration camp. Late in April 1945, Miklós Jr. was taken to Tyrol with other prominent inmates of Dachau. There the SS abandoned their prisoners as Allied forces advanced. The younger Miklós Horthy was liberated by the Fifth U.S. Army on May 5, 1945.

== Personal life ==
Father and son emigrated to Portugal, where Miklós Horthy Jr. lived almost fifty years before dying at Estoril, near Lisbon, in 1993. He had two daughters with his first wife Countess Mária Consuelo Károlyi (1905–1976), Zsófia Horthy (1928–2004, Mrs Henry Freytag, then Mrs Charles Filliettaz) and Nicolette Horthy (1929–1990, Baroness Georg Bachofen von Echt). He was also a founding partner of Hovione, a Portuguese pharmaceutical company.
