= István Horthy Jr. =

Hungarian physicist and architect (born 1941)

- Born: István Horthy de Nagybánya II; 17 January 1941 (age 85); Budapest, Kingdom of Hungary
- Other name: Sharif Horthy
- Education: Oxford University; Imperial College
- Occupations: Physicist; architect
- Spouses: Henrietta Josephine Chamberlain; Tuti
- Children: 5
- Parents: István Horthy (father); Ilona Edelsheim-Gyulai (mother)
- Relatives: Miklós Horthy (grandfather)

István Horthy de Nagybánya II (born 17 January 1941) is a Hungarian physicist and architect, son of Hungarian deputy regent István Horthy and Ilona Edelsheim-Gyulai, and grandson of Admiral Miklós Horthy who served as Regent of Hungary from 1920 to 1944. In 1965 he converted to Islam and took the name Sharif Horthy. Horthy is a prominent member of the Indonesian spiritual association Subud, and has translated works by its founder, Subuh Sumohadiwidjojo, into English.

== Early life and education ==
Horthy was born on 17 January 1941 in Budapest.

He graduated in 1962 with a degree in physics from Oxford University. He earned a second degree in Civil Engineering at Imperial College in 1966.

== Career ==
He worked as a consulting engineer in England and later in the Far East where he founded and managed two major Indonesian companies in the fields of consulting engineering, construction, and property development.

== Personal life ==
After years in Boston, Massachusetts, Horthy settled in England.

He has been married twice: his first wife was Henrietta Josephine Chamberlain; they have five children. Sharif is currently married to Tuti, a Javanese woman, and lives with her in Lewes, East Sussex.
