= Ilovka, Belgorod Oblast =

Ilovka Иловка
- Selo
- Location within Belgorod Oblast Location within Russia
- Coordinates: 50°42′N 38°37′E
- Country: Russia
- Region: Belgorod Oblast
- District: Alexeyevsky District
- Time zone: UTC+3:00

Ilovka (Russian: И́ловка) is a rural locality (a selo) and the administrative center of Ilovskoye Rural Settlement, Alexeyevsky District, Belgorod Oblast, Russia. The population was 352 as of 2010. There are 33 streets.

== Geography ==
Ilovka is located 11 km north of Alexeyevka (the district's administrative centre) by road. Podseredneye is the nearest rural locality.
